= List of battles by geographic location =

This list of battles is organized geographically and alphabetically, by country in its present territory.

== Bulgaria ==
- For Fall of the Western Roman Empire, see List of battles during the fall of the Western Roman Empire
- For Rus'–Byzantine War (970–971), see Sviatoslav's invasion of Bulgaria
- For Bulgarian–Ottoman wars, see List of battles during the Bulgarian–Ottoman wars
- For World War I, see Bulgaria during World War I
- For World War II, see Bulgaria during World War II

== Cambodia ==
- Battle of Kompong Speu – 1970 – Vietnam War
- Operation Chenla I – 1970 – 1971 – Cambodian Civil War (Vietnam War)
- Operation Chenla II – 1971 – Cambodian Civil War (Vietnam War)
- Battle of Snuol – 1971 – Vietnam War
- Battle of Kampot – 1974 Cambodian Civil War (Vietnam War)

== Canada ==
- Siege of Louisbourg (1745) - 1745 - War of the Austrian Succession
- For Anglo-French conflicts, see List of Anglo-French conflicts on Hudson Bay
- For battles in the Atlantic theater during the French and Indian War, see French and Indian War: Atlantic theater
- For battles during the Invasion of Quebec (1775), see American Revolutionary War: Canada
- For battles during the American Revolutionary War, see Nova Scotia in the American Revolution and Atlantic naval theatre
- Newfoundland expedition - 1796 - War of the First Coalition

== Cape Verde ==
Date	Name of the battle	Part of	1st combattant	2nd combattant	Result
11-28 November 1585	Capture of Santiago (1585)	Anglo-Spanish War (1585–1604)	Habsburg Spain	Kingdom of England	English victory
16 April 1781	Battle of Porto Praya	American Revolutionary War	Kingdom of Great Britain	Kingdom of France	Inconclusive

== Democratic Republic of the Congo ==
- Siege of Jadotville – 1961
- Second Battle for the Tunnel – 1961

== Costa Rica ==
Date	Name of the battle	Part of	1st combattant	2nd combattant	Result
13 August 1747	Raid on Matina	War of Jenkins' Ear (War of the Austrian Succession)	Kingdom of Great Britain	Kingdom of Spain (1700–1808)	British victory

== Croatia ==
- Battle of Cibalae - 316 - Civil wars of the Tetrarchy
- Battle of Mursa Major - 351 - Roman civil war of 350–353
- Battle of Pašman - 1190
- Battle of Curzola - 1298 - War of Curzola

== Denmark ==
- For Danish Civil War, see Military engagements during the Danish Civil War
- For Dano-Norwegian conflicts, see Dano-Norwegian conflicts
- For Dano-German conflicts, see Dano-German Conflicts
- Battle of Copenhagen – 1801 – War of the Second Coalition (French Revolutionary Wars)

== Djibouti ==
Date	Name of the battle	Part of	1st combattant	2nd combattant	Result
1551	Battle of Bab al-Mandab	Ottoman–Portuguese conflicts (1538–1560) (Ottoman–Portuguese confrontations)	Ottoman Empire	Portuguese Empire	Ottoman victory

== Dominica ==
Date	Name of the battle	Part of	1st combattant	2nd combattant	Result
June 1761	Invasion of Dominica (1761)	Seven Years' War	Kingdom of Great Britain	Kingdom of France	British victory
7 September 1778	Invasion of Dominica (1778)	American Revolutionary War	Kingdom of France	Kingdom of Great Britain	French victory
9-12 April 1782	Battle of the Saintes	American Revolutionary War	Kingdom of Great Britain	Kingdom of France	British victory
25 October 1800	USS Enterprise vs Flambeau	Quasi-War (French Revolutionary Wars)	United States	French First Republic	American victory

== East Timor/Timor-Leste ==
Date	Name of the battle	Part of	1st combattant	2nd combattant	Result
16 October 1999	Battle of Aidabasalala	1999 East Timorese crisis	Australia	Pro-Indonesia militia	Australian victory

== Ecuador ==
- Action of San Mateo Bay – 1594 – Anglo-Spanish War (1585–1604)
- Action off James Island – 1813 – War of 1812 (Sixty Years' War)
- Action off Charles Island – 1813 – War of 1812 (Sixty Years' War)

== England ==
See #United Kingdom

== Estonia ==
- Battle of Kautla – 1941 – World War II
- Battle of Osula – 1946 – Partisan war

== Ethiopia ==
- Battle of Marra Biete - 1320
- Battle of Das - 1322
- Battle of Gomit - 1445
- Battle of Adwa – 1895
- Battle of Keren – 1941

== France ==
- For pre-987 battles, see List of battles involving the Franks and Francia.
- List of battles involving the Kingdom of France, for entire wars during 987–1792, see list of wars involving the Kingdom of France
- For Anglo-French Wars, see list of battles during Anglo-French wars
- For post-1792 battles, see List of battles involving France in modern history. For wars involving modern France, see List of wars involving France
- For World War I, see Battles of World War I involving France
- For World War II, see Battles and operations of World War II involving France

== Greece ==
- Siege of Athens (287 BC) – 287 BC
- Siege of Rhodes (88 BC) – 88 BC – First Mithridatic War (Mithridatic Wars)
- Siege of Athens and Piraeus (87–86 BC) – 87 BC – 86 BC – First Mithridatic War (Mithridatic Wars)
- Battle of Chaeronea (86 BC) – 86 BC – First Mithridatic War (Mithridatic Wars)
- Battle of Orchomenus – 85 BC – First Mithridatic War (Mithridatic Wars)
- Battle of Lemnos (73 BCE) – 73 BC – Third Mithridatic War (Mithridatic Wars)
- Siege of Gomphi – 48 BC – Caesar's civil war
- Battle of Pharsalus – 48 BC – Caesar's civil war
- Siege of Thessalonica (254) – 254 – Roman–Germanic wars and Crisis of the Third Century
- Battle of Thermopylae (254) – 254 – Roman–Germanic wars and Crisis of the Third Century
- Sack of Athens (267 AD) – 267 – Crisis of the Third Century
- Battle of Thessalonica (380) – 380 – Gothic War (376–382) (Fall of the Western Roman Empire) and Roman–Germanic wars
- Siege of Thessalonica (617) – 617 or 618 – Avar–Byzantine wars
- Battle of Serres (1205) – Bulgarian–Latin wars
- Battle of Messinopolis – 1207 – Bulgarian–Latin wars
- Battle of Karydi - 1258 - War of the Euboeote Succession
- Battle of Settepozzi – 1263 – War of Saint Sabas
- Hospitaller conquest of Rhodes - 1306 - 1310 - Crusades
- Battle of Halmyros – 1311 – Catalan Company
- Battle of Amorgos (1312) - 1312 - Crusades
- Battle of Picotin – 1316 – Ferdinand of Majorca
- Battle of Manolada – 1316 – Ferdinand of Majorca
- Battle of Chios (1319) - 1319
- Battle of Saint George - 1320 - Byzantine–Frankish conflicts
- Battle of Rhodes (1320)
- Battle of Sapienza - 1354 - War of the Straits
- Battle of Achelous (1359) - 1359
- Battle of Megara (1359) - 1359 - Crusades
- Battle of Maritsa – 1371 – Serbian-Ottoman wars (Ottoman wars in Europe)
- Battle of Gardiki - 1375 - Struggle for Constantinople (1204–1261)
- Siege of Thessalonica (1422–1430) – 1422 – 1430 – Byzantine–Ottoman wars and Ottoman–Venetian wars
- Battle of the Echinades (1427) - 1427 - Struggle for Constantinople (1204–1261)
- Siege of Rhodes (1444) - 1444
- Siege of Mytilene - 1462 - Expansion of the Ottoman Empire
- Siege of Rhodes (1480) – 1480 – Ottoman wars in Europe
- Siege of Coron (1533–1534) - 1533 - Ottoman–Habsburg wars
- Battle of Mykonos – 1794 – War of the First Coalition (French Revolutionary Wars)
- Action of 18 August 1798 – 1798 – Mediterranean campaign of 1798 (War of the Second Coalition) [French Revolutionary Wars]
- Battle of Nicopolis (1798) – 1798 – French campaign in Egypt and Syria (War of the Second Coalition) [French Revolutionary Wars]
- Siege of Corfu (1798–1799) – 1798 – 1799 – Mediterranean campaign of 1798 (War of the Second Coalition) [French Revolutionary Wars]
- Battle of Athos – 1807 – Russo-Turkish War (1806–1812)
- Siege of Santa Maura (1810) – 1810 – Adriatic campaign of 1807–1814 (Napoleonic Wars)

== Haiti ==
- Capture of Fort Rocher – 1654 – Franco-Spanish War (1635–1659) (Thirty Years' War)
- Battle of Cap-Français – 1757 – Seven Years' War
- Battle of the Windward Passage – 1760 – Seven Years' War
- Action of 2 January 1783 – 1783 – American Revolutionary War
- Action of 1 January 1800 – 1800 – Quasi-War (French Revolutionary Wars)
- Battle of Fort Cachimán – 1844 – Dominican War of Independence
- Battle of Fort Rivière – 1915 – Banana Wars
- Battle of Port-au-Prince – 1920 – Banana Wars

== Hungary ==
- Battle of Bolia – 469 – Roman–Germanic wars
- Battle of Raab - 791 - Saxon Wars
- Battle of Ménfő - 1044 - German-Hungarian War
- Battle of Vértes - 1051
- Battle of the Theben Pass - 1060 - Hungarian civil war
- Battle of Kemej – 1074
- Battle of Mogyoród – 1074
- Battle of the Leitha River - 1246
- Battle of Isaszeg (1265) – 1265 – Hungarian Civil War (1264–1265)
- Battle of Lake Hód - 1282 - Feudal anarchy in Hungary
- Battle of Rozgony - 1312 - Charles I's wars for the centralized power
- Siege of Güns – 1526 – Habsburg–Ottoman wars in Hungary (1526–1568) (Ottoman–Habsburg wars) [Ottoman wars in Europe]
- Battle of Mohács – 1526 – Ottoman–Hungarian wars and Ottoman–Habsburg wars (Ottoman wars in Europe)
- Siege of Buda (1530) – 1530 – Habsburg–Ottoman wars in Hungary (1526–1568) (Ottoman–Habsburg wars) [Ottoman wars in Europe]
- Siege of Buda (1541) – 1541 – Habsburg–Ottoman wars in Hungary (1526–1568) (Ottoman–Habsburg wars) [Ottoman wars in Europe]
- Siege of Pest – 1542 – Habsburg–Ottoman wars in Hungary (1526–1568) (Ottoman–Habsburg wars) [Ottoman wars in Europe]
- Siege of Székesfehérvár (1543) – 1543 – Habsburg–Ottoman wars in Hungary (1526–1568) (Ottoman–Habsburg wars) [Ottoman wars in Europe]
- Battle of Keresztes – 1596 – Long Turkish War (Ottoman–Habsburg wars)
- Siege of Székesfehérvár – 1601 – Long Turkish War (Ottoman–Habsburg wars)
- Battle of Raab – 1809 – War of the Fifth Coalition (Napoleonic Wars)
- Battle of Debrecen – 1944
- Siege of Budapest – 1945
- Operation Spring Awakening – 1945

== India ==
See also:

- Afghan–Sikh Wars
- List of wars involving the Mughal Empire
- Battles involving the Maratha Empire
- List of wars involving Delhi Sultanate
- List of Anglo-Indian Wars

List of battles:

- First Battle of Eran - 498 - First Hunnic War
- Second Battle of Eran - 510 - First Hunnic War
- Battle of Venbai - 760
- Battle of Tellaru - 830
- Battle of Vallala - 911
- Battle of Takkolam - 948 - Krishna's Southern Expedition
- Battle of Kandalur Salai - 988 - Chola Expansions under Rajaraja
- Chola invasion of Kalinga (1097)
- Chola invasion of Kalinga (1110)
- Siege of Siwana - 1308 - Campaigns of Alauddin Khalji of Delhi Sultanate
- Siege of Warangal (1310) - 1310
- Battle of Kannanur - 1342
- First battle of Delhi (1398) – 1398 – Timurid conquests and invasions
- Second battle of Delhi (1398) – 1398 – Timurid conquests and invasions
- Battle of Kondavidu - 1427 - Vijayanagara–Gajapati wars
- First Battle of Cannanore – 1501 – Portuguese battles in the Indian Ocean
- Battle of Calicut (1503) – 1503 – Portuguese battles in the Indian Ocean
- Battle of Cochin - 1504 - Portuguese colonial campaigns
- Battle of Pandarane - 1504 - First Luso-Malabarese War
- Battle of Cannanore – 1506 – Portuguese–Mamluk naval war
- Siege of Cannanore (1507) – 1507 – Portuguese–Mamluk naval war
- Battle of Dabul - 1508 - Adil Shahi–Portuguese conflicts
- Portuguese conquest of Goa – 1510 – Portuguese–Mamluk naval war
- Battle of Kondavidu Fort - 1518
- First Battle of Panipat – 1526 – Mughal conquests
- Siege of Sambhal – 1526 – Mughal conquests
- Battle of Khanwa – 1527 – Mughal conquests
- Battle of Chanderi or siege of Chanderi – 1528 – Mughal conquests
- Battle of Ghaghra – 1529 – Mughal conquests
- Battle of Chausa - 1539 - Afghan-Mughal Wars
- Battle of Kannauj - 1540
- Battle of Sammel - 1544
- Battle of Bharuch - 1547 - Gujarati–Portuguese conflicts
- Battle of Vedalai - 1549 - Vijayanagar-Portuguese Conflicts
- Action at Diu – 1554 – Ottoman–Portuguese conflicts (1538–1559) (Ottoman–Portuguese confrontations)
- Battle of Machhiwara - 1555 - Humayun Campaign
- Battle of Sirhind (1555) - 1555 - Humayun Campaign
- Battle of Tughlaqabad - 1556 - Humayun Campaign
- Second Battle of Panipat – 1556 – Mughal conquests
- Battle of Talikota – 1565 – Muslim conquests in the Indian subcontinent
- Siege of Chittorgarh (1567–1568) - 1567 - Mughal–Rajput wars
- Siege of Ranthambore (1568) - 1568 - Mughal–Rajput wars
- Battle of Haldighati - 1576 - Mughal–Rajput wars
- Battle of Rajmahal - 1576 - Mughal–Rajput wars
- Siege of Penukonda - 1577
- Battle of Bhuchar Mori - 1591 - Mughal conquest of Gujarat
- Battle of Swally – 1612 – Portuguese Empire
- Battle of Samdhara – 1616 – Ahom–Mughal conflicts
- Battle of Samugarh – 1658 – Mughal War of Succession 1658–1659
- Battle of Saraighat – 1671 – Ahom–Mughal conflicts
- Siege of Jinji – 1690 – 1698 – Mughal–Maratha Wars
- Battle of Karnal – 1739 – Nader Shah's invasion of India (Campaigns of Nader Shah)
- Siege of Trichinopoly (1741) – 1741 – Battles involving the Maratha Empire
- Siege of Trichinopoly (1743) – 1743
- Battle of Plassey – 1757 – Bengal War and Seven Years' War
- Battle of Panipat (1761) – 1761 – Afghan-Maratha Wars
- Siege of Tanjore – 1769
- Siege of Pondicherry (1778) – 1778 – American Revolutionary War
- Battle of Sadras – 1782 – American Revolutionary War
- Battle of Negapatam (1782) – 1782 – American Revolutionary War
- Battle of Cuddalore (1783) – 1783 – American Revolutionary War
- Siege of Pondicherry (1793) – 1793 – French Revolutionary Wars
- Action of 28 February 1799 – 1799 – French Revolutionary Wars
- Battle of Shopian – 1819 – Afghan–Sikh Wars
- Battle of Mudki – 1845 – First Anglo-Sikh War
- Battle of Ferozeshah – 1845 – First Anglo-Sikh War
- Battle of Sohana – 1846 – First Anglo-Sikh War
- Battle of Baddowal – 1846 – First Anglo-Sikh War
- Battle of Aliwal – 1846 – First Anglo-Sikh War
- Battle of Sobraon – 1846 – First Anglo-Sikh War
- Battle of Asal Uttar – 1965 – Indo-Pakistani War of 1965
- Battle of Longewala – 1971 – Indo-Pakistani War of 1971
- Battle of Tololing – 1999

== Indonesia ==
- Chola invasion of Srivijaya - 1025 - South-East Asia campaign of Rajendra I
- Battle of Genter – 1222
- Battle of Bubat – 1357
- Battle of Palembang – 1407 – Ming treasure voyages
- Battle of Trowulan - 1478 - Spread of Islam in Indonesia
- Battle of Aceh – 1521 – Acehnese–Portuguese conflicts
- Battle of Lingga - 1525 - Malay–Portuguese conflicts
- Battle of Sunda Kelepa - 1527
- Battle of Aceh – 1528 – Acehnese–Portuguese conflicts
- Battle of Tidore - 1536
- Battle of Aceh – 1569 – Acehnese–Portuguese conflicts
- Battle of Bantam – 1601 – Dutch–Portuguese War
- Capture of Amboina – 1605 – Dutch-Portuguese War
- Fall of Jayakarta – 1619
- First Battle of Passempe – 1643
- Second Battle of Passempe – 1646
- Battle of Gegodog – 1676 – Trunajaya rebellion
- Battle of Surabaya – 1677 – Trunajaya rebellion
- Fall of Plered – 1677 – Trunajaya rebellion
- Assault of Kediri – 1678 – Trunajaya rebellion
- Action of 9 September 1796 – 1796 – French Revolutionary Wars
- Battle of Java Sea – 1942 - Pacific War
- Battle of Kotabaru – 1945 - Indonesian National Revolution
- Battle of Medan – 1945
- Battle of Semarang – 1945
- Battle of Ambarawa – 1945
- Battle of Surabaya – 1945
- Kolaka incident – 1945
- Cumbok affair – 1945
- Battle of Kumai – 1946
- Lengkong incident – 1946
- Bandung Sea of Fire – 1946
- Battle of Margarana – 1946
- 3 March affair – 1947
- Madiun Affair – 1948
- Siege of Surakarta – 1949
- Battle of Arafura Sea – 1962 – West New Guinea dispute
- Sunda Straits Crisis – 1964 – Indonesia-Malaysia confrontation
- Battle of Sungei Koemba – 1965
- Battle of Kindau – 1965
- Battle of Babang – 1965
- Arfai incident – 1965 – Papua conflict
- Operation Trisula – 1968
- Battle of Dili – 1975 – Indonesian invasion of East Timor

== Iran ==
- Battle of Diyala River – 693 BC – Campaigns of the Neo-Assyrian Empire
- Battle of Ulai – c. 653 BC – Assyrian conquest of Elam
- Battle of Susa – 647 BC – Assyrian conquest of Elam
- Battle of Hyrba – 552 BC – Wars of Cyrus the Great
- Battle of the Persian Border – c. 551 BC – Wars of Cyrus the Great
- Battle of Pasargadae – c. 550 BC – Wars of Cyrus the Great
- Battle of the Uxian Defile – 331 BC – Wars of Alexander the Great
- Battle of the Persian Gate – 330 BC – Wars of Alexander the Great
- Battle of Paraitakene – 317 BC – Second War of the Diadochi
- Battle of Gabiene – 315 BC – Second War of the Diadochi
- Battle of Ecbatana – 129 BC – Seleucid–Parthian Wars
- Battle of Hormozdgan – 224
- Battle of Avarayr – 451
- Battle of the Blarathon – 591 – Byzantine–Sasanian War of 572–591 (Roman–Persian Wars) and Sasanian civil war of 589–591
- Siege of Shushtar – 641 – 642 – Muslim conquest of Khuzestan (Muslim conquest of Persia)
- Siege of Gundishapur – 642 – Muslim conquest of Khuzestan (Muslim conquest of Persia)
- Battle of Nahavand – 642 – Muslim conquest of Central Persia (Muslim conquest of Persia)
- Battle of Spahan – 642 – Muslim conquest of Central Persia (Muslim conquest of Persia)
- Battle of Waj Rudh – 642 or 643 – Muslim conquest of Central Persia (Muslim conquest of Persia)
- Battle of Bayrudh – 643 or 644 – Muslim conquest of Khuzestan (Muslim conquest of Persia)
- Battle of Bishapur (643–644) – 643 – 644 – Muslim conquest of Pars (Muslim conquest of Persia)
- Battle of Istakhr (650–653) – 650 – 653 – Muslim conquest of Pars (Muslim conquest of Persia)
- Battle of Ray (651) – 651 – Muslim conquest of Central Persia (Muslim conquest of Persia)
- Battle of Nishapur – 652 – Muslim conquest of Khorasan (Muslim conquest of Persia)
- Battle of Marj Ardabil - 730 - Second Arab–Khazar War
- Battle of Ray (811) - 811 - Fourth Fitna
- Battle of Iskhabad - 940 - Samanid–Ziyarid Wars
- Battle of Damghan (1063) – 1063 – Seljuk Civil War
- Battle of Kerj Abu Dulaf – 1073 – Seljuk Civil War
- Battle of Rey - 1095
- Siege of Shahdiz - 1107 - Nizari–Seljuk conflicts
- Battle of Saveh - 1119
- Battle of Rey - 1194 - Seljuk-Khwarazmian Wars
- Battle of Nishapur - 1201 - Ghurid conquest of Khorasan
- Battle of Mount Siyalan - 1256 - Mongol conquest of Persia and Mesopotamia
- Siege of Firuzkuh - 1256 - Mongol conquest of Persia and Mesopotamia
- Siege of Maymun-Diz - 1256 - Mongol conquest of Persia and Mesopotamia
- Siege of Alamut - 1256 - Mongol conquest of Persia and Mesopotamia
- Battle of Zava – 1342
- Siege of Isfahan (1387) – 1387 – Timurid conquests and invasions
- Battle of Damghan (1447) – 1447 – Timurid wars of succession
- Battle of Nishapur (1447) – 1447 – Timurid wars of succession
- Battle of Farhadgerd – 1449 – Timurid wars of succession
- Battle of Sarakhs (1459) – 1459 – Timurid wars of succession
- Portuguese conquest of Hormuz - 1507 - Portuguese–Safavid wars
- Battle of Chaldiran – 1514 – Ottoman–Persian Wars
- Battle of the Strait of Hormuz (1553) – 1553 – Ottoman campaign against Hormuz (Ottoman–Portuguese conflicts (1538–1559)) [Ottoman–Portuguese confrontations]
- Battle of the Gulf of Oman – 1554 – Ottoman campaign against Hormuz (Ottoman–Portuguese conflicts (1538–1559)) [Ottoman–Portuguese confrontations]
- Battle of Leitao Coast - 1586
- Safavid capture of Tabriz (1603) – 1603 – Ottoman–Safavid War (1603–1618) (Ottoman–Persian Wars)
- Battle of Urmia (1604) – 1604 – Ottoman–Safavid War (1603–1618) (Ottoman–Persian Wars)
- Battle of Sufiyan – 1605 – Ottoman–Safavid War (1603–1618) (Ottoman–Persian Wars)
- Battle off Hormuz (1625) – 1625 – Dutch–Portuguese War
- Battle of Gulnabad – 1722 – Fall of the Safavid Empire (Campaigns of Nader Shah)
- Siege of Isfahan – 1722 – Fall of the Safavid Empire (Campaigns of Nader Shah)
- Peter the Great's capture of Rasht – 1722 – 1723 – Russo-Persian War (1722–1723) (Russo-Persian Wars)
- Battle of Sangan – 1727 – Khorasan campaign of Nader Shah (Campaigns of Nader Shah)
- Battle of Damghan (1729) – 1729 – Restoration of Tahmasp II to the Safavid throne (Campaigns of Nader Shah)
- Battle of Khwar Pass – 1729 – Restoration of Tahmasp II to the Safavid throne (Campaigns of Nader Shah)
- Battle of Murche-Khort – 1729 – Restoration of Tahmasp II to the Safavid throne (Campaigns of Nader Shah)
- Liberation of Isfahan – 1729 – Restoration of Tahmasp II to the Safavid throne (Campaigns of Nader Shah)
- Battle of Zarghan – 1730 – Restoration of Tahmasp II to the Safavid throne (Campaigns of Nader Shah)
- Battle of Aslanduz – 1812 – Russo-Persian War (1804–1813)

== Italy ==
For wars involving the historic states of Italy, temporarily refer to this Talk session in List of wars involving Italy since this list requires historians to verify and categorize them before creating an article for them.

== Kazakhstan ==
- Battle of Zhizhi – 36 BC – Han–Xiongnu War
- Irghiz River Skirmish – 1209 or 1219 – Mongol invasion of the Khwarazmian Empire
- Siege of Otrar – 1219 – 1220 – Mongol invasion of the Khwarazmian Empire

== Lebanon ==
- Battle of Djahy – 1178 BC or 1175 BC – Egyptian–Sea People wars
- Siege of Tyre – 332 BC – Wars of Alexander the Great
- Battle of Amioun – 694
- Revolt of Tyre (996–998) – 996–998 – (by the Fatimids)
- Siege of Tyre – 1111–1112 – (by the Crusaders under Baldwin I of Jerusalem)
- Siege of Tyre – 1124 – Venetian Crusade (Crusades)
- Keserwan campaigns – 1292, 1300 and 1305
- Battle of Ain Dara – 1711
- Battle of Lake Huleh – 1771
- Russian siege of Beirut – 1772–1773 (Part of Russo-Turkish Wars)
- Bombardment of Beirut (1840) – 1840 – Egyptian–Ottoman War (1839–1841)
- Battle of Sidon (1840) – 1840 – Egyptian–Ottoman War (1839–1841)
- Battle of Damour – 1941
- Battle of the Litani River – 1941
- Battle of Jezzine – 1941
- Battle of Merdjayoun – 1941
- Battle of Beirut – 1941
- Battle of Sidon – 1941
- 1948 Arab–Israeli War (small battles on the borders) – 1948
- Battle of the Hotels – 1975–1976
- Battle of Zahleh – 1980–1981
- Siege of Beirut – 1982
- Seven-Day War – 1993
- Battle of Khiam – 2000
- Battle of Maroun al-Ras – 2006
- Battle of Bint Jbeil – 2006
- Battle of Nahr al-Bared – 2007
- Qalamoun offensive – 2014
- Battle of Arsal – 2014
- Qalamoun Offensive – 2017

== Libya ==
- Siege of Tripoli (1551) – 1551 – Ottoman–Habsburg wars (Ottoman wars in Europe) and Italian War of 1551–1559 (Italian Wars)
- Action of 1 August 1801 – 1801 – First Barbary War (Barbary Wars)
- First Battle of Tripoli Harbor – 1802 – First Barbary War (Barbary Wars)
- Action of 22 June 1803 – 1803 – First Barbary War (Barbary Wars)
- Second Battle of Tripoli Harbor – 1804 – First Barbary War (Barbary Wars)
- Battle of Derna (1805) – 1805 – First Barbary War (Barbary Wars)
- Battle of Tripoli (1825) – 1825 – Sardinian-Tripolitanian war of 1825
- Bombardment of Tripoli (1828) – 1828 – Tripolitan-Neapolitan War

== Lithuania ==
- Battle of Saule – 1236 – Livonian Crusade (Northern Crusades) [Crusades]
- Battle of Memel (1257) – 1257 – Livonian Crusade (Northern Crusades) [Crusades]
- Battle of Skuodas (1259) – 1258 or 1259 – Livonian Crusade (Northern Crusades) [Crusades]
- Siege of Christmemel – 1315 – Lithuanian Crusade (Northern Crusades) [Crusades]
- Battle of Medininkai – 1320 – Lithuanian Crusade (Northern Crusades) [Crusades]
- Battle of Memel (1323) – 1323 – Lithuanian Crusade (Northern Crusades) [Crusades]
- Siege of Medvėgalis – 1329 – Lithuanian Crusade (Northern Crusades) [Crusades]
- Siege of Pilėnai – 1336 – Lithuanian Crusade (Northern Crusades) [Crusades]
- Battle of Strėva – 1348 – Lithuanian Crusade (Northern Crusades) [Crusades]
- Siege of Kaunas (1362) – 1362 – Lithuanian Crusade (Northern Crusades) [Crusades]
- Battle of Skuodas (1658) – 1658 – Deluge (history) and Second Northern War (Northern Wars)
- Battle of Valkininkai (1700) – 1700 – Lithuanian Civil War (1697–1702)
- Battle of Tryškiai – 1701 – Swedish invasion of Poland (1701–1706) (Great Northern War) [Northern Wars]
- Siege of Kaunas (1915) – 1915 – World War I
- Battle of Wilno – 1939
- Battle of Raseiniai – 1941

== Luxembourg ==
- Siege of Luxembourg (1684) – 1684 – War of the Reunions
- Siege of Luxembourg (1794–1795) – 1794 – 1795 – War of the First Coalition (French Revolutionary Wars)

== Madagascar ==
- Battle of Madagascar – 1942 – World War II
- Malagasy Uprising – 1947

== Malaysia ==
- Capture of Malacca (1511) – 1511 – Portuguese Empire in the Indonesian Archipelago (Portuguese Empire)
- Siege of Malacca (1568) – 1568
- Siege of Malacca (1606) – 1606 – Dutch–Portuguese War
- Battle of Cape Rachado – 1606 – Dutch–Portuguese War
- Battle of Malacca (1641) – 1641 – Dutch–Portuguese War
- Action of 10 September 1782 – 1782 – American Revolutionary War

== Mali ==
- Battle of Kirina – 1235
- Battle of Jenné – 1599
- Battle of Areich Hind – 2010
- First Battle of Ménaka – 2012
- Battle of In Emsal – 2012
- Battle of Aguelhok (2012) – 2012
- Battle of Tinzaouaten – 2012
- Battle of Kidal (2012) – 2012
- Battle of In-Delimane – 2012
- Second Battle of Ménaka – 2012
- Battle of Tessalit – 2013
- Battle of Ifoghas – 2013
- Battle of In Khalil – 2013
- Battle of Timetrine – 2013
- Battle of Imenas – 2013
- Battle of Tin Keraten – 2013
- Battle of In Arab – 2013
- Battle of Anefis (May 2013) – 2013
- Battle of Anefis (June 2013) – 2013
- Battle of Kondaoui – 2014
- Battle of Dayet in Maharat – 2014
- Battle of Anéfis (2014) – 2014
- Battle of Kidal (2016) – 2016
- Battle of Takellote - 2017

== Malta ==
- Capture of Malta (218 BC) – 218 BC – Second Punic War (Punic Wars)
- Siege of Melite (870) – c. 870 – Muslim conquest of Sicily (Arab–Byzantine wars)
- Siege of Medina (1053–1054) – 1053 or 1054 – Arab–Byzantine wars
- Norman invasion of Malta – 1091 – Norman conquest of southern Italy (Byzantine–Norman wars)
- Battle of Malta – 1283 – War of the Sicilian Vespers
- Invasion of Gozo – 1551
- Great Siege of Malta – 1565
- Raid of Żejtun – 1614
- French invasion of Malta – 1798 – Mediterranean campaign of 1798 (War of the Second Coalition) [French Revolutionary Wars]
- Siege of Malta (1798–1800) – 1798 – 1800 – Mediterranean campaign of 1798 (War of the Second Coalition) [French Revolutionary Wars]
- Battle of the Malta Convoy – 1800 – Mediterranean campaign of 1798 (War of the Second Coalition) [French Revolutionary Wars]
- Siege of Malta – 1940–1942

== Manchuria ==
- Battle of Sarhū – 1619

== Marshall Islands ==
- Battle of Kwajalein – 1944
- Battle of Eniwetok – 1944

== Mauritania ==
- Battle of Tabfarilla – 1056
- Battle of Ain Ben Tili (January 1976) – 1976
- Battle of Bassikounou – 2011

== Mauritius ==
- Action of 5 May 1794 – 1794 – French Revolutionary Wars
- Battle of Île Ronde – 1794 – French Revolutionary Wars
- Battle of Port Louis – 1799 – French Revolutionary Wars

== Mexico ==
- Battle of Tlatelolco - 1473
- Battle of Atlixco - 1503 - Flower war
- Battle of Catoche - 1517 - Spanish colonization of the Americas
- Battle of Centla - 1519 - Spanish colonization of the Americas
- Battle of Cempoala - 1520 - Spanish colonization of the Americas
- La Noche Triste - 1520 - Spanish colonization of the Americas
- Battle of Otumba - 1520 - Spanish colonization of the Americas
- Fall of Tenochtitlan - 1521 - Spanish colonization of the Americas
- Battle of San Juan de Ulúa (1568) – 1568 – Anglo-Spanish trade war (1568-1573)
- Raid on Tabasco (1599) – 1599 – Anglo-Spanish War (1585–1604)
- Spanish attack on San Lorenzo maroons - 1610 - Slave Revolts in North America
- Battle of Almolonga – 1823 – Casa Mata Plan Revolution
- Battle of Tampico (1829) – 1829 – Spanish attempts to reconquer Mexico
- Battle of Zacatecas (1835) – 1835 – Zacatecas rebellion of 1835
- Action of April 3, 1836 – 1836 – Texas Revolution
- Battle of Puebla – 1862 – Second French intervention in Mexico
- Crawford affair – 1886 – Apache Wars
- Battle of Mazocoba – 1900 – Yaqui Wars
- Battle of Veracruz – 1914 – Mexican Revolution

== Mongolia ==
For pre 1911, see List of wars involving Mongolia (pre 1911) and Mongol conquests

== Morocco ==
- Battle of the Muthul – 109 BC – Jugurthine War
- Siege of the fortress at Muluccha – 106 BC – Jugurthine War
- Battle of the Nobles – 740 – Berber Revolt (Berber Wars)
- Battle of Bagdoura – 741 – Berber Revolt (Berber Wars)
- Battle of Cape Spartel – 1782 – American Revolutionary War
- Battle of Tétouan – 1860

== Nauru ==
- Operation RY – 1942 – Pacific War (World War II)

== Nepal ==
- Battle of Jit Gadhi – 1814 – Anglo-Nepalese War
- Battle of Makwanpur (1816) – 1816 – Anglo-Nepalese War

== Netherlands ==
- Battle of Baduhenna Wood – 28 – Roman–Germanic wars
- Battle of Finnsburg - 450 - Germanic Heroic Age
- Battle on the Rhine - 525
- Battle of Dorestad – c. 695 – Frisian–Frankish wars
- Battle of the Boarn – 734 – Frisian–Frankish wars
- Siege of Asselt – 882 – Viking expansion
- Battle of Vlaardingen – 1018
- Battle of IJsselmeer - 1076
- Battle of Ane - 1227
- Battle of Maastricht (1267) - 1267 - Liège-Brabant wars
- Siege of Maastricht (1303) - 1303 - Liège-Brabant wars
- Siege of Amsterdam (1303–1304) - 1303 - Franco-Flemish War
- Siege of Zierikzee - 1303 - Franco-Flemish War
- Siege of Schoonhoven (1304) - 1304 - Franco-Flemish War
- Battle of Zierikzee – 1304 – Franco-Flemish War
- Battle on the Manpad - 1304 - Franco-Flemish War
- Siege of Sittard (1318) - 1318 - War of the Limburg Succession
- Siege of Maastricht (1334) - 1334 - Liège-Brabant wars
- Battle of Cadzand – 1337 – Edwardian Phase (Hundred Years' War)
- Battle of Arnemuiden – 1338 – Edwardian Phase (Hundred Years' War)
- Battle of Sluys or Battle of l'Écluse – 1340 – Edwardian Phase (Hundred Years' War)
- Siege of Utrecht (1345) - 1345 - Friso-Hollandic Wars
- Battle of Warns - 1345 - Friso-Hollandic Wars
- Battle of Naarden - 1350 - Hook and Cod wars
- Siege of Medemblik (1351) - 1351 - Hook and Cod wars
- Battle of Veere - 1351 - Hook and Cod wars
- Battle of Zwartewaal - 1351 - Hook and Cod wars
- Siege of Geertruidenberg (1351–1352) - 1351 - Hook and Cod wars
- Battle of Soest - 1356 - Hook and Cod wars
- Siege of Heusden (1358-1359) - 1358 - Hook and Cod wars
- Siege of Heemskerk - 1358 - Hook and Cod wars
- Siege of Delft (1359) - 1359 - Hook and Cod wars
- Siege of Venlo (1373) - 1373 - First War of the Guelderian Succession
- Second Siege of Altena Castle - 1393
- Battle of Schoterzijl - 1396 - Friso-Hollandic Wars
- Siege of Gorinchem (1402) - 1402 - Arkel War
- Siege of Maastricht (1407–1408) - 1407
- Siege of IJsselstein (1416-17) - 1416 - Hook and Cod wars
- Battle of Okswerderzijl - 1417 - Great Frisian War
- Siege of Gorinchem (1417) - 1417 - Hook and Cod wars
- Siege of Dordrecht (1418) - 1418 - Hook and Cod wars
- Battle of Dokkum (1418) - 1418 - Great Frisian War
- Battle of Miedum - 1419 - Great Frisian War
- Battle of the Palesloot - 1420 - Great Frisian War
- Siege of Leiden (1420) - 1420 - Hook and Cod wars
- Battle of Sloten (1420) - 1420 - Great Frisian War
- Siege of Geertruidenberg (1420) - 1420 - Hook and Cod wars
- Siege of Schoonhoven (1425) - 1425 - Hook and Cod wars
- Battle of Alphen aan den Rijn - 1425 - Hook and Cod wars
- Battle of Brouwershaven - 1426 - Hook and Cod wars
- Siege of Haarlem (1426) - 1426 - Hook and Cod wars
- Battle of Alphen aan den Rijn - 1426 - Hook and Cod wars
- Battle of Hoorn - 1426 - Hook and Cod wars
- Siege of Zevenbergen - 1426 - Hook and Cod wars
- Battle of Wieringen - 1427 - Hook and Cod wars
- Siege of Amersfoort (1427) - 1427 - Hook and Cod wars
- Siege of Gouda (1428) - 1428 - Hook and Cod wars
- Siege of Deventer (1456) - 1456 - Hook and Cod wars
- Siege of Venlo - 1459
- Battle of Aalsum - 1463 - Donia War
- Siege of Leiden (1481) - 1481 - Hook and Cod wars
- Battle of Scherpenzeel - 1481 - Hook and Cod wars
- Battle of Vreeswijk (1481) - 1481 - Hook and Cod wars
- Battle of Westbroek - 1481 - Hook and Cod wars
- Siege of IJsselstein (1482) - 1482 - Hook and Cod wars
- Siege of Utrecht (1483) - 1483 - Hook and Cod wars
- Battle of the Lek - 1489 - Hook and Cod wars
- Siege of Montfoort - 1490 - Hook and Cod wars
- Battle of Moordrecht - 1490 - Hook and Cod wars
- Battle of Brouwershaven (1490) - 1490 - Hook and Cod wars
- Arumer Zwarte Hoop - 1515 - Frisian peasant rebellion
- Siege of Zwolle - 1524 - Guelders Wars
- Battle of Heiligerlee (1536) – 1536 – Guelders Wars and Count's Feud (European wars of religion)
- Battle of Heiligerlee (1568) - 1568 - Eighty Years' War
- Battle of the Ems - 1568 - Eighty Years' War
- Siege of Groningen (1568) - 1568 - Eighty Years' War
- Capture of Brielle - 1572 - Eighty Years' War
- Siege of Kampen (1572) - 1572 - Eighty Years' War
- Relief of Goes - 1572 - Eighty Years' War
- Siege of Middelburg (1572–1574) - 1572 - Eighty Years' War
- Siege of Haarlem - 1572 - Eighty Years' War
- Battle of Flushing - 1573 - Eighty Years' War
- Battle of Borsele - 1573 - Eighty Years' War
- Battle of Haarlemmermeer - 1573 - Eighty Years' War
- Capture of Geertruidenberg (1573) - 1573 - Eighty Years' War
- Siege of Alkmaar - 1573 - Eighty Years' War
- Battle on the Zuiderzee - 1573 - Eighty Years' War
- Battle of Delft (1573) - 1573 - Eighty Years' War
- Siege of Leiden - 1573 - Eighty Years' War
- Battle of the Scheldt (1574) - 1574 - Eighty Years' War
- Capture of Valkenburg (1574) - 1574 - Eighty Years' War
- Battle of Mookerheyde - 1574 - Eighty Years' War
- Siege of Zaltbommel - 1574 - Eighty Years' War
- Battle of Zoetermeer - 1574 - Eighty Years' War
- Siege of Buren - 1575 - Eighty Years' War
- Siege of Oudewater (1575) - 1575 - Eighty Years' War
- Siege of Schoonhoven (1575) - 1575 - Eighty Years' War
- Siege of Bommenede - 1575 - Eighty Years' War
- Siege of Woerden - 1575 - Eighty Years' War
- Siege of Zierikzee - 1575 - Eighty Years' War
- Siege of Krimpen aan de Lek - 1576 - Eighty Years' War
- Attack on Muiden - 1576 - Eighty Years' War
- Siege of Vredenburg - 1576 - Eighty Years' War
- Siege of Breda (1577) - 1577 - Eighty Years' War
- Siege of Kampen (1578) - 1578 - Eighty Years' War
- Siege of Deventer (1578) - 1578 - Eighty Years' War
- Siege of Maastricht (1579) - 1579 - Eighty Years' War
- Siege of Groningen (1580) - 1580 - Eighty Years' War
- Battle of the Hardenbergerheide - 1580 - Eighty Years' War
- Siege of Steenwijk (1580–1581) - 1580 - Eighty Years' War
- Capture of Breda (1581) - 1581 - Eighty Years' War
- Battle of Goor - 1581 - Eighty Years' War
- Battle of Noordhorn - 1581 - Eighty Years' War
- Siege of Niezijl - 1581 - Eighty Years' War
- Siege of Lochem (1582) - 1582 - Eighty Years' War
- Keppel Castle - 1582 - Eighty Years' War
- Siege of Eindhoven (1583) - 1583 - Eighty Years' War
- Battle of Steenbergen (1583) - 1583 - Eighty Years' War
- Battle of Terborg - 1584 - Eighty Years' War
- Siege of Zutphen (1584) - 1584 - Eighty Years' War
- Battle of Amerongen - 1585 - Eighty Years' War
- Siege of IJsseloord - 1585 - Eighty Years' War
- Battle of Boksum - 1586 - Eighty Years' War
- Siege of Grave (1586) - 1586 - Eighty Years' War
- Siege of Venlo (1586) - 1586 - Eighty Years' War
- Battle of Zutphen - 1586 - Eighty Years' War
- Siege of Zutphen (1586) - 1586 - Eighty Years' War
- Siege of Sluis (1587) - 1587 - Eighty Years' War
- Siege of Medemblik (1588) - 1588 - Eighty Years' War
- Siege of Bergen op Zoom (1588) - 1588 - Eighty Years' War
- Siege of Heusden (1589) - 1589 - Eighty Years' War
- Battle of Zoutkamp - 1589 - Eighty Years' War
- Capture of Breda (1590) - 1590 - Eighty Years' War
- Siege of Zutphen (1591) - 1591 - Eighty Years' War
- Siege of Deventer (1591) - 1591 - Eighty Years' War
- Siege of Knodsenburg - 1591 - Eighty Years' War
- Siege of Hulst (1591) - 1591 - Eighty Years' War
- Siege of Nijmegen (1591) - 1591 - Eighty Years' War
- Siege of Steenwijk (1592) - 1592 - Eighty Years' War
- Siege of Coevorden (1592) - 1592 - Eighty Years' War
- Siege of Geertruidenberg (1593) - 1593 - Eighty Years' War
- Siege of Coevorden (1593) - 1593 - Eighty Years' War
- Siege of Groningen (1594) - 1594 - Eighty Years' War
- Siege of Groenlo (1595) - 1595 - Eighty Years' War
- Siege of Groenlo (1597) - 1597 - Eighty Years' War
- Siege of Bredevoort (1597) - 1597 - Eighty Years' War
- Siege of Zaltbommel - 1599 - Eighty Years' War
- Battle of Scheveningen – 1653 – First Anglo-Dutch War (Anglo-Dutch Wars)
- Holmes's Bonfire – 1666 – Second Anglo-Dutch War (Anglo-Dutch Wars)
- Siege of Groenlo (1672) – 1672 – Franco-Dutch War
- Siege of Groningen (1672) – 1672 – Franco-Dutch War
- Battle of Schooneveld – 1673 – Third Anglo-Dutch War (Franco-Dutch War and Anglo-Dutch Wars)
- Siege of Maastricht (1673) – 1673 – Franco-Dutch War
- Battle of Texel – 1673 – Third Anglo-Dutch War (Franco-Dutch War and Anglo-Dutch Wars)
- Siege of Maastricht (1676) – 1676 – Franco-Dutch War
- Battle of Texel (1694) – 1694 – Nine Years' War
- Siege of Bergen op Zoom (1747) – 1747 – War of the Austrian Succession
- Siege of Maastricht (1748) – 1748 – War of the Austrian Succession
- Capture of Sint Eustatius – 1781 – Fourth Anglo-Dutch War (American Revolutionary War)
- 1792–1815 Coalition Wars: See
  - List of battles of the War of the First Coalition (20 April 1792 – 18 October 1797); further information Low Countries theatre of the War of the First Coalition
  - List of battles of the War of the Second Coalition (1798/9 – 1801/2); further information Anglo-Russian invasion of Holland
  - List of battles of the War of the Third Coalition (1803/1805–1805/1806); see also Battle of Blaauwberg
  - List of battles of the War of the Fourth Coalition (9 October 1806 – 9 July 1807); see also Siege of Hamelin
  - List of battles of the War of the Fifth Coalition (10 April – 14 October 1809); see also Walcheren Campaign
  - List of battles of the War of the Sixth Coalition (3 March 1813 – 30 May 1814); further information Low Countries campaign 1814
  - List of battles of the Hundred Days (War of the Seventh Coalition) (15/20 March – 8 July / 16 August 1815); further information Waterloo campaign
- Battle of the Grebbeberg – 1940
- Battle of the Afsluitdijk – 1940
- Operation Market Garden – 1944
- Battle of Overloon – 1944
- Battle of the Scheldt – 1944

== New Zealand ==
- Battle of the Five Forts - 1450 - Ngāti Hotu
- Battle of Kororareka – 1845 – Flagstaff War
- Battle of Puketutu – 1845 – Flagstaff War
- Battle of Ōhaeawai – 1845 – Flagstaff War
- Battle of Ruapekapeka – 1845 – Flagstaff War
- Battle of Battle Hill – 1846 – Hutt Valley campaign (New Zealand Wars)

== Nicaragua ==
- Battle for Río San Juan de Nicaragua – 1762 – Anglo-Spanish War (1762–1763) (Seven Years' War)
- Battle of Rivas – 1856

== Nigeria ==
- Battle of Tabkin Kwatto – 1804 – Fulani War
- Battle of Tsuntua – 1804 – Fulani War

== North Macedonia ==
- Battle of Skopje – 1004 – Byzantine conquest of Bulgaria (Byzantine–Bulgarian wars)
- Battle of Strumica – 1014 – Byzantine conquest of Bulgaria (Byzantine–Bulgarian wars)
- Battle of Bitola – 1015 – Byzantine conquest of Bulgaria (Byzantine–Bulgarian wars)
- Battle of Pelagonia - 1259 - Struggle for Constantinople (1204–1261)
- Battle of Mokra (1445) – 1445 – Skanderbeg's rebellion (Ottoman wars in Europe)
- Battle of Otonetë – 1446 – Skanderbeg's rebellion (Ottoman wars in Europe)
- Siege of Svetigrad (1448) – 1448 – Skanderbeg's rebellion (Ottoman wars in Europe)
- Battle of Oranik – 1448 – Albanian–Venetian War and Skanderbeg's rebellion (Ottoman-Albanian Wars)
- Battle of Polog – 1453 – Skanderbeg's rebellion (Ottoman wars in Europe)
- Battle of Oranik (1456) – 1456 – Skanderbeg's rebellion (Ottoman wars in Europe)
- Battle of Ohrid – 1464 – Skanderbeg's rebellion and First Ottoman–Venetian War (Ottoman–Venetian wars) [Ottoman wars in Europe]
- Battle of Vaikal – 1465 – Skanderbeg's rebellion (Ottoman wars in Europe)
- Battle of Meçad (1465) – 1465 – Skanderbeg's rebellion (Ottoman wars in Europe)
- Skopje fire of 1689 - 1689 - Great Turkish War
- Battle of Egri Palanka - 1689 - Great Turkish War
- Karposh's rebellion - 1689 - Karposh's rebellion

== Norway ==
- Battle of Hakadal – c. 860 – Unification of Norway
- Battle of Orkdal – c. 870 – Unification of Norway
- First battle of Solskjel – c. 870 – Unification of Norway
- Second battle of Solskjel – c. 870 – Unification of Norway
- Battle of Fjaler – c. 880 – Unification of Norway
- Battle of Hafrsfjord – between 872 and 900 – Unification of Norway
- Battle of Nesjar – 1016
- Battle of Stiklestad – 1030
- Battle of Oslo (1161) - 1161 - Civil war era in Norway
- Battle of Kringen – 1612 – Kalmar War
- Battle of Vågen – 1665 – Second Anglo-Dutch War (Anglo-Dutch Wars)
- Battle of Høland – 1716 – Norway during the Great Northern War (Great Northern War) [Northern Wars]
- Siege of Fredriksten – 1718 – Norway during the Great Northern War (Great Northern War) [Northern Wars]
- Action of 22 August 1795 – 1795 – War of the First Coalition (French Revolutionary Wars)
- Battle of Lier (1808) – 1808 – Dano-Swedish War of 1808–1809 (Napoleonic Wars)
- Battle of Toverud – 1808 – Dano-Swedish War of 1808–1809 (Napoleonic Wars)
- Battle of Rødenes – 1808 – Dano-Swedish War of 1808–1809 (Napoleonic Wars)
- Battle of Trangen – 1808 – Dano-Swedish War of 1808–1809 (Napoleonic Wars)
- Battle of Alvøen – 1808 – Gunboat War
- Battle of Mobekk – 1808 – Dano-Swedish War of 1808–1809 (Napoleonic Wars)
- Battle of Prestebakke – 1808 – Dano-Swedish War of 1808–1809 (Napoleonic Wars)
- Battle of Berby – 1808 – Dano-Swedish War of 1808–1809 (Napoleonic Wars)
- Battle of Silda – 1810 – Gunboat War
- Battle of Lyngør – 1812 – Gunboat War
- Invasion of Hvaler – 1814 – Swedish–Norwegian War (1814) (Napoleonic Wars)
- Battle of Tistedalen – 1814 – Swedish–Norwegian War (1814) (Napoleonic Wars)
- Battle of Lier (1814) – 1814 – Swedish–Norwegian War (1814) (Napoleonic Wars)
- Siege of Fredrikstad – 1814 – Swedish–Norwegian War (1814) (Napoleonic Wars)
- Battle of Matrand – 1814 – Swedish–Norwegian War (1814) (Napoleonic Wars)
- Battle of Rakkestad – 1814 – Swedish–Norwegian War (1814) (Napoleonic Wars)
- Battle of Langnes – 1814 – Swedish–Norwegian War (1814) (Napoleonic Wars)
- Battle of Kjølberg Bridge – 1814 – Swedish–Norwegian War (1814) (Napoleonic Wars)
- Battle of Drøbak Sound – 1940
- Battles of Narvik – 1940
- Battle of Midtskogen – 1940
- Battle of Dombås – 1940
- Namsos campaign – 1940
- Åndalsnes landings – 1940
- Battle of Hegra Fortress – 1940
- Battle of Vinjesvingen – 1940
- Battle of the North Cape – 1943

== Oman ==
- Capture of Muscat (1552) – 1552 – Ottoman campaign against Hormuz (Ottoman–Portuguese conflicts (1538–1559)) [Ottoman–Portuguese confrontations]
- Battle of the Strait of Hormuz (1553) – 1553 – Ottoman campaign against Hormuz (Ottoman–Portuguese conflicts (1538–1559)) [Ottoman–Portuguese confrontations]
- Battle of the Gulf of Oman – 1554 – Ottoman campaign against Hormuz (Ottoman–Portuguese conflicts (1538–1559)) [Ottoman–Portuguese confrontations]
- Battle off Hormuz (1625) – 1625 – Dutch–Portuguese War
- Battle of Mirbat – 1972 – Dhofar Rebellion

== Pakistan ==
- Battle of the Ten Kings – c. 14th century BC
- Battle of the Hydaspes River – 326 BC – Indian campaign of Alexander the Great (Wars of Alexander the Great)
- Battle of Rasil – 644 – Muslim conquests in the Indian subcontinent
- Battle of Aror - 711 - Arab conquest of Sindh
- Battle of Peshawar (1001) – 1001 – Ghaznavid–Hindu Shahi Wars
- Battle of Chach – 1008 - Ghaznavid campaigns in India
- Battle of Nandana – 1014 – Ghaznavid–Hindu Shahi Wars
- Battle of the Indus (1027) - 1027 - Ghaznavid campaigns in India
- Siege of Uch - 1176 - Ghurid campaigns in India
- Siege of Lahore (1186) - 1186 - Ghurid campaigns in India
- Battle of Jhelum (1206) - 1206 - Ghurid campaigns in India
- Battle of the Indus – 1221 – Mongol invasion of the Khwarazmian Empire
- Battle of Sivistan – 1298 – Mongol invasions of India
- Bajaur massacre - 1519 - Campaigns of Babur
- Sack of Lahore - 1524 - Campaigns of Babur
- Battle of the Gulf of Oman – 1554 – Ottoman campaign against Hormuz (Ottoman–Portuguese conflicts (1538–1559)) [Ottoman–Portuguese confrontations]
- Battle of Sialkot (1761) – 1761 – Indian campaign of Ahmad Shah Durrani (Afghan–Sikh Wars)
- Battle of Gujranwala (1761) – 1761 – Indian campaign of Ahmad Shah Durrani (Afghan–Sikh Wars)
- Siege of Lahore (1761) – 1761 – Indian campaign of Ahmad Shah Durrani (Afghan–Sikh Wars)
- Battle of the Ravi Ford – 1762 – Indian campaign of Ahmad Shah Durrani (Afghan–Sikh Wars)
- Battle of Sialkot (1763) – 1763 – Indian campaign of Ahmad Shah Durrani (Afghan–Sikh Wars)
- Battle of Qarawal – 1764 – Indian campaign of Ahmad Shah Durrani (Afghan–Sikh Wars)
- Battle of Sutlej – 1765 – Indian campaign of Ahmad Shah Durrani (Afghan–Sikh Wars)
- Battle of Rohtas (1779) – 1779 – Afghan–Sikh Wars
- Battle of Shujabad – 1780 – Afghan–Sikh Wars
- Battle of Kasur – 1807 – Afghan–Sikh Wars
- Battle of Hasan Abdal (1813) – 1813 – Afghan–Sikh Wars
- Battle of Attock (1813) – 1813 – Afghan–Sikh Wars
- Siege of Multan (1818) – 1818 – Afghan–Sikh Wars
- Battle of Nowshera – 1823 – Afghan–Sikh Wars
- Battle of Jamrud – 1837 – Afghan–Sikh Wars
- Siege of Kahun – 1840 – First Anglo-Afghan War (Great Game)
- Action at Hykulzye – 1842 – First Anglo-Afghan War (Great Game)
- Siege of Multan (1848-1849) – 1848 – 1849 – Second Anglo-Sikh War
- Battle of Ramnagar – 1848 – Second Anglo-Sikh War
- Battle of Chillianwala – 1849 – Second Anglo-Sikh War
- Battle of Gujrat – 1849 – Second Anglo-Sikh War
- Battle of Chawinda – 1965 – (Indo-Pakistani war)
- Battle of Miani – 1843 – (then Indian Empire)
- Battle of Basantar – 1971 – Indo-Pakistani War of 1971

== Palau ==
- Battle of Peleliu – 1944
- Battle of Angaur - 1944

== Palestine ==
- Siege of Gaza – 332 BC – Wars of Alexander the Great
- Battle of Gaza (312 BC) – 312 BC – Third War of the Diadochi
- Battle of Raphia – 217 BC – Fourth Syrian War
- Battle of the Ascent of Lebonah – 167 BC or 166 BC – Maccabean Revolt
- Battle of Beth Horon (166 BC) – 166 BC – Maccabean Revolt
- Battle of Emmaus – 165 BC – Maccabean Revolt
- Battle of Beth Zur – 164 BC – Maccabean Revolt
- Battle of Beth Zechariah – 162 BC – Maccabean Revolt
- Battle of Elasa – 160 BC – Maccabean Revolt
- Siege of Herodium – 71 – First Jewish–Roman War
- Siege of Herodium – 134 – Bar Kokhba revolt
- Siege of Betar – 135 – Bar Kokhba revolt
- Battle of Dathin – 634 – Arab–Byzantine wars
- Battle of Nablus (1260) – 1260 – Mongol invasions of the Levant
- Battle of Yaunis Khan – 1516 – Ottoman–Mamluk War (1516–1517) (Ottoman wars in Asia)
- Battle of Hebron – 1834 – Peasants' revolt in Palestine
- Battle of Rafah – 1917 – World War I
- First Battle of Gaza – 1917 – World War I
- Second Battle of Gaza – 1917 – World War I
- Battle of Megiddo (1918) – 1918 – World War I
- Battle of Nablus (1918) – 1918 – World War I

== Papua New Guinea ==
- Battle of Milne Bay – 1942
- Battle of Savo Island – 1942
- Battle of Buna-Gona – 1942
- Battle of the Bismarck Sea – 1943

== Paraguay ==
- Battle of Campichuelo – 1810 – Paraguay campaign (Argentine War of Independence)
- Battle of Paraguarí – 1811 – Paraguay campaign (Argentine War of Independence)
- Battle of Tacuarí – 1811 – Paraguay campaign (Argentine War of Independence)

== Peru ==
For the Viceroyalty and the present-day Republic of Peru, please refer to List of wars involving Peru. For the Inca Empire and preceding states, see List of wars involving the Inca Empire.

== Philippines ==
- Battle of Mactan – 1521
- Battle of Manila (1570) – 1570 – History of the Philippines (1565–1898)
- Battle of Bangkusay – 1571 – History of the Philippines (1565–1898)
- Battle of Manila (1574) – 1574 – History of the Philippines (1565–1898)
- Battle of Playa Honda – 1617 – Eighty Years' War (European wars of religion)
- Battles of La Naval de Manila – 1646 – Eighty Years' War, 1621–1648 (Eighty Years' War and Thirty Years' War) [European wars of religion]
- Battle of Puerto de Cavite – 1647 – Eighty Years' War, 1621–1648 (Eighty Years' War and Thirty Years' War) [European wars of religion]
- Battle of Manila (1762) – 1762 – Anglo-Spanish War (1762–1763) (Seven Years' War)
- Action of 30 October 1762 – 1762 – Anglo-Spanish War (1762–1763) (Seven Years' War)
- Raid on Manila – 1798 – French Revolutionary Wars
- Battle of Binakayan-Dalahican – 1896
- Battle of Manila Bay – 1898
- Battle of Tirad Pass – 1899
- Battle of Bataan – 1942
- Battle of Corregidor – 1942
- Battle of the Philippine Sea – 1944
- Battle of Leyte Gulf – 1944
- Battle of Leyte – 1945
- Battle of Luzon – 1944
- Battle of Mindanao – 1945
  - Battle of Davao – 1945
  - Battle of Maguindanao – 1945
- Battle of Basilan – 2014
- Siege of Marawi – 2017

== Poland ==
- Battle of Niekładź - 1121
- Battle on the Pilica - 1145 - Polish civil war
- Battle of Julin Bridge - 1170 - Danish Crusades
- Battle of Słońca – 1238 – First war against Swietopelk II
- Teutonic takeover of Danzig (Gdańsk) – 1308 – Polish–Teutonic War
- Battle of Wopławki - 1311 - Lithuanian Crusade
- Battle of Lelowo - 1345 - Polish–Bohemian War (1345–1348)
- Battle of Pogoń - 1345 - Polish–Bohemian War (1345–1348)
- Battle of Grunwald – 1410 – Polish–Lithuanian–Teutonic War
- Siege of Marienburg (1410) – 1410 – Polish–Lithuanian–Teutonic War
- Battle of Koronowo – 1410 – Polish–Lithuanian–Teutonic War
- Battle of Grotniki – 1439 – Hussite Wars
- Siege of Malbork (1454) – 1454 – Thirteen Years' War (1454–1466) (Polish–Teutonic War)
- Battle of Chojnice (1454) – 1454 – Thirteen Years' War (1454–1466) (Polish–Teutonic War)
- Battle of Eylau (1455) – 1455 – Thirteen Years' War (1454–1466) (Polish–Teutonic War)
- Battle of Ryn – 1456 – Thirteen Years' War (1454–1466) (Polish–Teutonic War)
- Battle of Sępopol – 1457 – Thirteen Years' War (1454–1466) (Polish–Teutonic War)
- Siege of Marienburg (1457) – 1457 – 1460 – Thirteen Years' War (1454–1466) (Polish–Teutonic War)
- Battle of Pruszcz Gdański – 1460 – Thirteen Years' War (1454–1466) (Polish–Teutonic War)
- Battle of Świecino – 1462 – Thirteen Years' War (1454–1466) (Polish–Teutonic War)
- Battle of Vistula Lagoon – 1463 – Thirteen Years' War (1454–1466) (Polish–Teutonic War)
- Battle of the Cosmin Forest – 1497
- Siege of Allenstein – 1521 – Polish–Teutonic War (1519–1521)
- Battle of Lubieszów – 1577 – Danzig rebellion
- Siege of Danzig (1577) – 1577 – Danzig rebellion
- Battle of Byczyna - 1588 - War of the Polish Succession (1587–1588)
- Battle of Gniew – 1626 – Polish–Swedish War (1626–1629) (Polish–Swedish wars)
- Battle of Czarne – 1627 – Polish–Swedish War (1626–1629) (Polish–Swedish wars)
- Battle of Dirschau – 1627 – Polish–Swedish War (1626–1629) (Polish–Swedish wars)
- Battle of Oliwa – 1627 – Polish–Swedish War (1626–1629) (Polish–Swedish wars)
- Battle of Górzno – 1629 – Polish–Swedish War (1626–1629) (Polish–Swedish wars)
- Battle of Trzciana – 1629 – Polish–Swedish War (1626–1629) (Polish–Swedish wars)
- Battle of Ujście – 1655 – Deluge (history) and Second Northern War (Northern Wars)
- Siege of Danzig (1655–1660) – 1655 – 1660 – Deluge (history) and Second Northern War (Northern Wars)
- Siege of Kraków (1657) – 1657 – Deluge (history) and Second Northern War (Northern Wars)
- Battle of Krasnobród (1672) – 1672 – Polish–Ottoman War (1672–1676) (Polish–Ottoman Wars)
- Battle of Kliszów – 1702 – Swedish invasion of Poland (1701–1706) (Great Northern War) [Northern Wars]
- Battle of Pułtusk (1703) – 1703 – Swedish invasion of Poland (1701–1706) (Great Northern War) [Northern Wars]
- Siege of Thorn (1703) – 1703 – Swedish invasion of Poland (1701–1706) (Great Northern War) [Northern Wars]
- Battle of Poznań (1704) – 1704 – Swedish invasion of Poland (1701–1706) (Great Northern War) [Northern Wars]
- Battle of Poniec – 1704 – Swedish invasion of Poland (1701–1706) (Great Northern War) [Northern Wars]
- Battle of Warsaw (1705) – 1705 – Swedish invasion of Poland (1701–1706) (Great Northern War) [Northern Wars]
- Battle of Praga (1705) – 1705 – Swedish invasion of Poland (1701–1706) (Great Northern War) [Northern Wars]
- Battle of Fraustadt – 1706 – Swedish invasion of Poland (1701–1706) (Great Northern War) [Northern Wars]
- Battle of Kalisz – 1706 – Swedish invasion of Poland (1701–1706) (Great Northern War) [Northern Wars]
- Battle of Koniecpol – 1708 – Swedish invasion of Russia (Great Northern War) [Northern Wars]
- Siege of Danzig (1734) – 1734 – War of the Polish Succession
- Battle of Mollwitz – 1741 – First Silesian War (War of the Austrian Succession and Silesian Wars)
- Battle of Hohenfriedberg – 1745 – Second Silesian War (War of the Austrian Succession and Silesian Wars)
- Battle of Hennersdorf – 1745 – Second Silesian War (War of the Austrian Succession and Silesian Wars)
- Battle of Moys – 1757 – Third Silesian War (Seven Years' War)
- Battle of Breslau (1757) – 1757 – Third Silesian War (Seven Years' War)
- Battle of Leuthen – 1757 – Third Silesian War (Seven Years' War)
- Siege of Breslau (1757) – 1757 – Third Silesian War (Seven Years' War)
- Siege of Küstrin – 1758 – Seven Years' War
- Battle of Zorndorf – 1758 – Third Silesian War (Seven Years' War)
- Battle of Kay – 1759 – Seven Years' War
- Battle of Frisches Haff – 1759 – Pomeranian War (Seven Years' War)
- Battle of Kunersdorf – 1759 – Third Silesian War (Seven Years' War)
- Battle of Neustadt (1760) – 1760 – Third Silesian War (Seven Years' War)
- Siege of Glatz – 1760 – Third Silesian War (Seven Years' War)
- Battle of Landeshut (1760) – 1760 – Third Silesian War (Seven Years' War)
- Battle of Liegnitz (1760) – 1760 – Third Silesian War (Seven Years' War)
- Battle of Burkersdorf (1762) – 1762 – Third Silesian War (Seven Years' War)
- Siege of Schweidnitz (1762) – 1762 – Third Silesian War (Seven Years' War)
- First battle of Lanckorona – 1771 – Bar Confederation
- Second Battle of Lanckorona – 1771 – Bar Confederation
- Battle of Dubienka – 1792 – Polish–Russian War of 1792
- Battle of Racławice – 1794 – Kościuszko Uprising
- Warsaw Uprising (1794) – 1794 – Kościuszko Uprising
- Battle of Szczekociny – 1794 – Kościuszko Uprising
- Battle of Chełm – 1794 – Kościuszko Uprising
- Battle of Rajgród (1794) – 1794 – Kościuszko Uprising
- Siege of Warsaw (1794) – 1794 – Kościuszko Uprising
- Battle of Maciejowice – 1794 – Kościuszko Uprising
- Battle of Praga – 1794 – Kościuszko Uprising
- Battle of Czarnowo – 1806 – War of the Fourth Coalition (Napoleonic Wars)
- Battle of Golymin – 1806 – War of the Fourth Coalition (Napoleonic Wars)
- Battle of Pułtusk (1806) – 1806 – War of the Fourth Coalition (Napoleonic Wars)
- Siege of Graudenz – 1807 – War of the Fourth Coalition (Napoleonic Wars)
- Battle of Mohrungen – 1807 – War of the Fourth Coalition (Napoleonic Wars)
- Battle of Allenstein – 1807 – War of the Fourth Coalition (Napoleonic Wars)
- Battle of Ostrołęka (1807) – 1807 – War of the Fourth Coalition (Napoleonic Wars)
- Siege of Danzig (1807) – 1807 – War of the Fourth Coalition (Napoleonic Wars)
- Siege of Kolberg (1807) – 1807 – War of the Fourth Coalition (Napoleonic Wars)
- Battle of Guttstadt-Deppen – 1807 – War of the Fourth Coalition (Napoleonic Wars)
- Battle of Heilsberg – 1807 – War of the Fourth Coalition (Napoleonic Wars)
- Battle of Raszyn (1809) – 1809 – Austro-Polish War (War of the Fifth Coalition) [Napoleonic Wars]
- Battle of Radzymin (1809) – 1809 – Austro-Polish War (War of the Fifth Coalition) [Napoleonic Wars]
- Battle of Kock (1809) – 1809
- Siege of Danzig (1813) – 1813 – German campaign of 1813 (War of the Sixth Coalition) [Napoleonic Wars]
- Battle of Haynau – 1813 – German campaign of 1813 (War of the Sixth Coalition) [Napoleonic Wars]
- Battle of the Katzbach – 1813 – German campaign of 1813 (War of the Sixth Coalition) [Napoleonic Wars]
- Battle of Kock (1944) – fought during Operation Tempest: World War II
- Battle of Nasielsk – 1920
- Battle of Tannenberg – 1914
- Battle of the Vistula River – 1914 – during World War I
- Battle of Warsaw (1920) – during the Polish–Soviet War
- Siege of Warsaw (1939) – at the outset of World War II
- Warsaw Uprising – near the end of World War II

== Portugal ==
- Arcos de Valdevez tournament - 1141
- Battle of Alcácer do Sal (1161) - 1161 - Portugal in the Reconquista
- Battle of Palmela - 1165 - Portugal in the Reconquista
- Alvor massacre – 1189 – Reconquista and Third Crusade (Crusades)
- Siege of Silves (1189) – 1189 – Reconquista and Third Crusade (Crusades)
- Siege of Tomar - 1190 - Almohad wars in the Iberian Peninsula
- Siege of Faro (1249) – 1249 – Reconquista
- Battle of Alfarrobeira – 1449
- Battle of Cape St. Vincent (1641) – 1641 – Eighty Years' War, 1621–1648 (Eighty Years' War and Thirty Years' War) [European wars of religion]
- Battle of Lagos (1693) – 1693 – Nine Years' War
- Battle of Cape St. Vincent (1719) – 1719 – War of the Quadruple Alliance
- Action of 18 March 1748 – 1748 – War of Jenkins' Ear (War of the Austrian Succession)
- Action of 14 September 1779 – 1779 – American Revolutionary War
- Action of 11 November 1779 – 1779 – American Revolutionary War
- Action of 20 November 1779 – 1779 – American Revolutionary War
- Battle of Cape St. Vincent (1780) – 1780 – American Revolutionary War
- Action of 24 February 1780 – 1780 – American Revolutionary War
- Action of 9 August 1780 – 1780 – American Revolutionary War
- Action of 30 May 1781 – 1781 – Fourth Anglo-Dutch War (American Revolutionary War)
- Battle of the Levant Convoy – 1795 – War of the First Coalition (French Revolutionary Wars)
- Battle of Cape St. Vincent (1797) – 1797 – Anglo-Spanish War (1796–1808) (French Revolutionary and Napoleonic Wars)
- Action of 5 October 1804 – 1804 – Anglo-Spanish War (1796–1808) (French Revolutionary and Napoleonic Wars)
- Action of 7 December 1804 – 1804 – Anglo-Spanish War (1796–1808) (French Revolutionary and Napoleonic Wars)

== Russia ==
- Battle of the River Thatis – 310 BC or 309 BC – Bosporan Civil War
- Siege of Siracena – 309 BC – Bosporan Civil War
- Battle of the Tanais River – 373
- Siege of Derbent - 627 - Perso-Turkic war of 627–629
- Battle of Balanjar (652) - 652 - First Arab–Khazar War
- Battle of Balanjar (723) - 723 - Arab–Khazar Wars
- Battle of Balanjar (730s) - 732 - Second Arab–Khazar War
- Siege of Sarkel - 965 - Rus'–Byzantine Wars
- Sack of Atil - 969 - Caspian expeditions of the Rus'
- Siege of Derbent - 1173 or 1174 - Caspian expeditions of the Rus'
- Battle of Lipitsa - 1216 - Vladimir-Suzdal war of succession
- Battle of Samara Bend - 1223 - Mongol invasion of Volga Bulgaria
- Siege of Bilär - 1236 - Mongol invasion of Volga Bulgaria
- Battle on the Ice – 1242 – Livonian campaign against Rus' and Northern Crusades (Crusades)
- List of wars and battles involving the Principality of Smolensk
- Battle of Terek River - 1262 - Berke–Hulegu war
- Battle of Rudau – 1370 – Lithuanian Crusade (Northern Crusades) Crusades
- Battle of the Kalka River (1381) - 1381 - Great Troubles
- Siege of Moscow (1382) - 1382 - Post-Great Troubles
- Battle of the Kondurcha River – 1391 – Tokhtamysh–Timur war (Timurid conquests and invasions)
- Battle of the Terek River – 1395 – Tokhtamysh–Timur war (Timurid conquests and invasions)
- Battle of Belyov – 1437 – Muscovite War of Succession and Russo-Kazan Wars
- Battle of Suzdal – 1445 – Muscovite War of Succession and Russo-Kazan Wars
- Battle of Shelon - 1471 - Muscovite-Novgorodian Wars
- Great Stand on the Ugra River - 1480 - Golden Horde conflicts
- Siege of Kazan (1487) – 1487 – Russo-Kazan Wars
- Battle of Vedrosha – 1500 – Muscovite–Lithuanian Wars
- Battle of the Siritsa River – 1501 – Muscovite–Lithuanian Wars
- Siege of Smolensk (1502) – 1502 – Muscovite–Lithuanian Wars
- Siege of Smolensk (1514) – 1514 – Muscovite–Lithuanian Wars
- Siege of Opochka – 1517 – Muscovite–Lithuanian Wars
- Siege of Kazan – 1552 – Russo-Kazan Wars
- Battle of Kivinebb – 1555 – Russo-Swedish War (1554–1557) (Russo-Swedish Wars)
- Battle of Nevel – 1562 – Livonian War (Polish-Russian Wars, Polish–Swedish wars and Russo-Swedish Wars)
- Fire of Moscow (1571) - 1571 - Russo-Crimean Wars
- Battle of Molodi – 1572 – Russo-Crimean Wars
- Siege of Velikiye Luki – 1580 – Livonian War (Polish-Russian Wars, Polish–Swedish wars and Russo-Swedish Wars)
- Battle of Toropets (1580) – 1580 – Livonian War (Polish-Russian Wars, Polish–Swedish wars and Russo-Swedish Wars)
- Siege of Pskov – 1581 – 1582 – Livonian War (Polish-Russian Wars, Polish–Swedish wars and Russo-Swedish Wars)
- Battle of Chuvash Cape - 1582 - Russian conquest of Siberia
- Battle of Torches – 1583 – Ottoman–Safavid War (1578–1590) (Ottoman–Persian Wars)
- Battle of Dobrynichi – 1605 – Time of Troubles (False Dmitry I)
- Siege of Kromy – 1605 – Time of Troubles (False Dmitry I)
- Siege of Moscow (1606) – 1606 – Uprising of Bolotnikov (Time of Troubles)
- Battle of Kozelsk – 1607 – Time of Troubles (False Dmitry II)
- Battle of Zaraysk – 1608 – Time of Troubles (False Dmitry II)
- Battle of Bolkhov – 1608 – Time of Troubles (False Dmitry II)
- Battle of Medvezhiy Brod – 1608 – Time of Troubles (False Dmitry II)
- Siege of Troitsky monastery – 1608 – 1610 – Time of Troubles (False Dmitry II)
- Siege of Smolensk (1609–1611) – 1609 – 1611 – Polish–Muscovite War (1609–1618)
- Siege of Tsaryovo-Zaymishche – 1610 – Polish–Muscovite War (1609–1618)
- Battle of Klushino or Battle of Kłuszyn – 1610 – Polish–Muscovite War (1609–1618)
- Battle of Moscow (1612) – 1612 – Polish–Muscovite War (1609–1618)
- Siege of Smolensk (1613–1617) – 1613 – 1617 – Polish–Muscovite War (1609–1618)
- Battle of Mozhaysk – 1618 – Polish–Muscovite War (1609–1618)
- Siege of Moscow (1618) – 1618 – Polish–Muscovite War (1609–1618)
- Siege of Smolensk (1654) – 1654 – Russo-Polish War (1654–1667) (Polish-Russian Wars)
- Siege of Nyenschantz (1656) – 1656 – Russo-Swedish War (1656–1658) (Second Northern War) [Northern Wars]
- Battle of Gdov – 1657 – Russo-Swedish War (1656–1658) (Second Northern War) [Northern Wars]
- First siege of Albazin – 1685 – Sino-Russian border conflicts
- Second siege of Albazin – 1686 – Sino-Russian border conflicts
- Siege of Nöteborg (1702) – 1702 – Great Northern War (Northern Wars)
- Battle of Systerbäck – 1703 – Great Northern War (Northern Wars)
- Battle of the Neva (1708) – 1708 – Swedish invasion of Russia (Great Northern War) [Northern Wars]
- Battle of Rajovka – 1708 – Swedish invasion of Russia (Great Northern War) [Northern Wars]
- Battle of Koporye – 1708 – Great Northern War (Northern Wars)
- Evacuation of Kolkanpää – 1708 – Great Northern War (Northern Wars)
- Siege of Viborg (1710) – 1710 – Great Northern War (Northern Wars)
- Battle of Gross-Jägersdorf – 1757 – Seven Years' War
- Battle of Beshtamak – 1774 – Russo-Circassian War
- Battle of Kazan (1774) – 1774 – Pugachev's Rebellion
- Battle of Tsaritsyn (1774) – 1774 – Pugachev's Rebellion
- Battle of the Sunja – 1785 – Russo-Circassian War and Chechen–Russian conflict
- Battle of Jilehoy – 1787 – Russo-Circassian War
- Battle of Hogland – 1788 – Russo-Swedish War (1788–1790)
- Battle of Kronstadt – 1790 – Russo-Swedish War (1788–1790)
- Battle of Uransari – 1790 – Russo-Swedish War (1788–1790)
- Battle of Björkösund – 1790 – Russo-Swedish War (1788–1790)
- Battle of Vyborg Bay (1790) – 1790 – Russo-Swedish War (1788–1790)
- Siege of Anapa (1791) – 1791 – Russo-Circassian War and Russo-Turkish War (1787–1792)
- Battle of Khankala (1807) – 1807 – Russo-Circassian War
- Battle of Pälkjärvi – 1808 – Finnish War (Napoleonic Wars)
- List of battles of the French invasion of Russia – 1812 – Napoleonic Wars
- Battle of Dadi-yurt – 1819 – Russo-Circassian War
- Battle of Khunzakh – 1830 – Russo-Circassian War
- Battle of Gimry – 1832 – Russo-Circassian War
- Battle of Argvani – 1839 – Russo-Circassian War
- Siege of Akhoulgo – 1839 – Russo-Circassian War
- Siege of Lazarevsky – 1840 – Russo-Circassian War
- Battle of the Valerik River – 1840 – Russo-Circassian War
- Battle of Ichkeria – 1842 – Russo-Circassian War
- Battle of Dargo (1845) – 1845 – Russo-Circassian War
- Battle of Gordali (1852) – 1852 – Russo-Circassian War
- Battle of Ghunib – 1859 – Russo-Circassian War
- Battle of Qbaada – 1864 – Russo-Circassian War
- Battle of Lake Khasan – 1939
- Operation Bagration – 1944
- Battle of Grozny (November 1994)
- Battle of Dolinskoye – 1994
- Battle of Khankala (1994)
- Battle of Grozny (1994–1995)
- Battle of Grozny (August 1996)
- Battle of Grozny (1999–2000)
- Battle for Height 776 – 2000
- Battle of Komsomolskoye – 2000
- Battle for Vedeno – 2001

== Saint Kitts and Nevis ==
- Battle of St. Kitts (1629) – 1629 – Anglo-Spanish War (1625–1630) (Thirty Years' War)
- Battle of Nevis – 1667 – Second Anglo-Dutch War (Anglo-Dutch Wars)
- Siege of Brimstone Hill – 1782 – American Revolutionary War
- Battle of Saint Kitts – 1782 – American Revolutionary War
- USS Constellation vs L'Insurgente – 1799 – Quasi-War (French Revolutionary Wars)
- USS Constellation vs La Vengeance – 1800 – Quasi-War (French Revolutionary Wars)

== Saint Lucia ==
- Battle of St. Lucia – 1778 – American Revolutionary War
- Capture of St. Lucia – 1778 – American Revolutionary War

== Saint Vincent and the Grenadines ==
- Capture of Saint Vincent – 1779 – American Revolutionary War

== Saudi Arabia ==
- Yawm al-Buath - 610s to 620s
- Battle of Badr – 624 – Muslim–Quraysh War
- Battle of Uhud – 625 – Muslim–Quraysh War
- Battle of Hamra al-Asad – 625 – Muslim–Quraysh War
- Battle of the Trench – 626 – 627 – Muslim–Quraysh War
- Battle of Khaybar – 628 – Military career of Muhammad
- Conquest of Mecca – 629 – 630 – Muslim–Quraysh War
- Battle of Hunayn – 630 – Military career of Muhammad
- Battle of Autas – 630 – Military career of Muhammad
- Siege of Ta'if – 630 – Military career of Muhammad
- Battle of Zhu Qissa – 632 – Ridda Wars
- Battle of Buzakha – 632 – Ridda Wars
- Battle of Ghamra – 632 – Ridda Wars
- Battle of Zafar – 632 – Ridda Wars
- Battle of Yamama – 632 – Ridda Wars
- Battle of Dawmat al-Jandal – 633 – Ridda Wars
- Battle of Naqra – 633 – Ridda Wars
- Battle of al-Harra – 683 – Second Fitna
- Siege of Mecca (683) – 683 – Second Fitna
- Siege of Mecca (692) – 692 – Second Fitna
- Battle of Fakhkh – 786
- Siege of Jeddah – 1517 – Portuguese–Mamluk naval war and Ottoman–Portuguese confrontations
- Siege of Qatif (1551) – 1551 – Ottoman–Portuguese conflicts (1538–1559) (Ottoman–Portuguese confrontations)
- Battle of Yanbu – 1811 – Wahhabi War
- Battle of Al-Safra – 1812 – Wahhabi War
- Battle of Medina (1812) – 1812 – Wahhabi War
- Battle of Jeddah (1813) – 1813 – Wahhabi War
- Battle of Mecca (1813) – 1813 – Wahhabi War
- Siege of Diriyah – 1818 – Wahhabi War
- Battle of Mulayda – September 29, 1890 – Rashidi troops ended the Second Saudi State.
- Battle of Riyadh (1902) – Ibn Saud recaptured Riyadh from Rashidis.
- Battle of Dilam – (1903) – Ibn Saud victory over Rashidis.
- Battle of Bekeriyah (1904) – Ibn Saud victory over Rashidis.
- Battle of Shinanah (1904) – Ibn Saud victory over Rashidis.
- Battle of Rawdat Muhanna (1906) – Ibn Saud victory over Rashidis.
- Battle of Tarafiyah (1907) – Ibn Saud victory over Rashidis.
- Battle of Mecca (1924) – Ibn Saud captured Mecca.
- Battle of Jeddah (1925) – Ibn Saud captured Jeddah and ended the Kingdom of Hejaz.
- Bombing of Bahrain in World War II – 1940 – World War II
- Battle of Khafji – (1991) – Saudi, Qatari and American troops successfully regained control over Khafji from Iraqis.

== Scotland ==
- Battle of Mons Graupius – 83 or 84 – Roman conquest of Britain
- Siege of Burnswark – 140 – Roman conquest of Britain
- Battle of Alclud Ford – c. 574 or 580 or 590 – Anglo-Saxon settlement of Britain
- Battle of Raith – 596 – Anglo-Saxon settlement of Britain
- Battle of Degsastan – 603 – Anglo-Saxon settlement of Britain
- Battle of Two Rivers – 671 – Anglo-Saxon settlement of Britain
- Battle of Dun Nechtain – 685 – Anglo-Saxon settlement of Britain
- Battle of Lumphanan – 1057
- Battle of Stracathro – 1130
- Battle of Renfrew – 1164
- Battle of Mam Garvia – 1187
- Battle of Red Ford – 1294
- Battle of Duns – 1372 – Anglo-Scottish Wars
- Battle of Dingwall – 1411 – Clan Donald and Stewart royal family wars
- Battle of Harlaw – 1411 – Clan Donald and Stewart royal family wars
- Siege of Inverness (1429) – 1429 – Clan Donald and Stewart royal family wars
- Battle of Mamsha – 1429 – Clan MacDonald-Clan Fraser of Lovat feuds
- Battle of Lochaber – 1429 – Clan Donald and Stewart royal family wars
- Battle of Inverlochy (1431) – 1431 – Clan Donald and Stewart royal family wars
- Siege of Edinburgh Castle – 1440 – Clan Douglas and Stewart royal family feud
- Battle of Arbroath – 1445 or 1446 – Clan Gordon-Clan Lindsay feud
- Battle of Brechin – 1452 – Clan Douglas and Stewart royal family feud and Clan Gordon-Clan Lindsay feud
- Battle of Arkinholm – 1455 – Clan Douglas and Stewart royal family feud
- Battle of Corpach – c. 1470
- Battle of Lagabraad – 1480 or 1483 – Clan Donald and Stewart royal family wars, Clan MacDonald-Clan Mackenzie feud and Clan MacDonald-Clan Fraser of Lovat feuds
- Battle of Bloody Bay – 1480 or 1483 – Clan Maclean-Clan MacDonald feuds and Clan MacLeod-Clan MacDonald feuds
- Battle of Lochmaben Fair – 1484 – Clan Douglas and Stewart royal family feud
- Battle of Blar Na Pairce – 1491 – Clan Donald and Stewart royal family wars and Clan MacDonald-Clan Mackenzie feud
- Raid on Ross – 1491 – Clan Donald and Stewart royal family wars and Clan MacDonald-Clan Mackenzie feud
- Battle of Drumchatt (1497) – 1497 – Clan Donald and Stewart royal family wars and Clan MacDonald-Clan Mackenzie feud
- Battle of Glendale (Skye) – c. 1490 or more likely 1513 – Clan MacLeod-Clan MacDonald feuds
- Battle of Melrose – 1526 – Clan Douglas and Stewart royal family feud and Clan Kerr - Clan Scott feud
- Battle of Linlithgow Bridge – 1526 – Clan Douglas and Stewart royal family feud
- Siege of Leith – 1560 – European wars of religion and Anglo-Scottish Wars
- Battle of Corrichie – 1562 – Clan Gordon-Clan Forbes feud
- Battle of Carberry Hill – 1567
- Battle of the Spoiling Dyke – 1578 – Clan MacLeod-Clan MacDonald feuds
- Battle of Carinish – 1601 – Clan MacLeod-Clan MacDonald feuds
- Battle of Coire Na Creiche – 1601 – Clan MacLeod-Clan MacDonald feuds
- Battle of Morar – 1602 – Clan MacDonald-Clan Mackenzie feud
- Battle of Glen Fruin – 1603
- Battle of the Brig of Dee – 1639 – First Bishops' War (Scotland in the Wars of the Three Kingdoms) [Wars of the Three Kingdoms]
- Battle of Tippermuir – 1644 – First English Civil War, 1644 (First English Civil War) [Scotland in the Wars of the Three Kingdoms] [Wars of the Three Kingdoms]
- Battle of Aberdeen (1644) – 1644 – First English Civil War, 1644 (First English Civil War) [Scotland in the Wars of the Three Kingdoms] [Wars of the Three Kingdoms]
- Battle of Inverlochy (1645) – 1645 – Clan MacDonald-Clan Campbell feuds and First English Civil War, 1645 (First English Civil War) [Scotland in the Wars of the Three Kingdoms] [Wars of the Three Kingdoms]
- Battle of Auldearn – 1645 – First English Civil War, 1645 [Scotland in the Wars of the Three Kingdoms] [Wars of the Three Kingdoms]
- Battle of Alford – 1645 – First English Civil War, 1645 [Scotland in the Wars of the Three Kingdoms] [Wars of the Three Kingdoms]
- Battle of Kilsyth – 1645 – First English Civil War, 1645 [Scotland in the Wars of the Three Kingdoms] [Wars of the Three Kingdoms]
- Battle of Philiphaugh – 1645 – First English Civil War, 1645 [Scotland in the Wars of the Three Kingdoms] [Wars of the Three Kingdoms]
- Battle of Annan Moor – 1645 – First English Civil War, 1645 (First English Civil War) [Scotland in the Wars of the Three Kingdoms] [Wars of the Three Kingdoms]
- Battle of Aberdeen (1646) – 1646 – First English Civil War, 1646 (First English Civil War) [Scotland in the Wars of the Three Kingdoms] [Wars of the Three Kingdoms]
- Battle of Lagganmore – 1646 – Clan MacDonald-Clan Campbell feuds and First English Civil War, 1646 (First English Civil War) [Scotland in the Wars of the Three Kingdoms] [Wars of the Three Kingdoms]
- Battle of Rhunahaorine Moss – 1647 – Clan MacDonald-Clan Campbell feuds and First English Civil War (Scotland in the Wars of the Three Kingdoms) [Wars of the Three Kingdoms]
- Battle of Castle Sween – 1647 – Clan MacDonald-Clan Campbell feuds
- Whiggamore Raid – 1648 – Anglo-Scottish war (1650–1652) (Scotland in the Wars of the Three Kingdoms) [Wars of the Three Kingdoms]
- Battle of Stirling (1648) – 1648 – Anglo-Scottish war (1650–1652) (Scotland in the Wars of the Three Kingdoms) [Wars of the Three Kingdoms]
- Siege of Inverness (1649) – 1649 – Anglo-Scottish war (1650–1652) (Scotland in the Wars of the Three Kingdoms) [Wars of the Three Kingdoms]
- Siege of Inverness (1650) – 1650 – Anglo-Scottish war (1650–1652) (Scotland in the Wars of the Three Kingdoms) [Wars of the Three Kingdoms]
- Battle of Carbisdale – 1650 – Anglo-Scottish war (1650–1652) (Scotland in the Wars of the Three Kingdoms) [Wars of the Three Kingdoms]
- Battle of Dunbar (1650) – 1650 – Anglo-Scottish war (1650–1652) (Scotland in the Wars of the Three Kingdoms) [Wars of the Three Kingdoms]
- Battle of Hieton – 1650 – Anglo-Scottish war (1650–1652) (Scotland in the Wars of the Three Kingdoms) [Wars of the Three Kingdoms]
- Battle of Inverkeithing – 1651 – Anglo-Scottish war (1650–1652) (Scotland in the Wars of the Three Kingdoms) [Wars of the Three Kingdoms]
- Siege of Dundee – 1651 – Anglo-Scottish war (1650–1652) (Scotland in the Wars of the Three Kingdoms) [Wars of the Three Kingdoms]
- Battle of Tullich – 1654 – Glencairn's rising (Scotland in the Wars of the Three Kingdoms) [Wars of the Three Kingdoms]
- Battle of Dalnaspidal – 1654 – Glencairn's rising (Scotland in the Wars of the Three Kingdoms) [Wars of the Three Kingdoms]
- Battle of Rullion Green – 1666 – Pentland Rising
- Battle of Ronas Voe – 1674 – Third Anglo-Dutch War (Franco-Dutch War and Anglo-Dutch Wars)
- Battle of Drumclog – 1679 – Scottish Covenanter Wars
- Battle of Bothwell Bridge – 1679 – Scottish Covenanter Wars

== Senegal ==
- British capture of Senegal – 1758 – Seven Years' War
- Capture of Gorée – 1758 – Seven Years' War

== Serbia ==
- Battle of Naissus – 268 or 269 – Crisis of the Third Century and Roman–Germanic wars
- Battle of the Margus – 285 – Crisis of the Third Century
- Battle of Bassianae – 468 – Roman–Germanic wars
- Battle of Sirmium (489) - 489
- Siege of Sirmium – 580 – 582 – Avar–Byzantine wars
- Battles of Viminacium – 599 – Avar–Byzantine wars
- Battle of the Rishki Pass - 759 Byzantine–Bulgarian wars
- Battle of W.l.n.d.r – 934 – Hungarian invasions of Europe
- Battle of Haram - 1128 - Byzantine–Hungarian War (1127–1129)
- Battle of Sirmium - 1167 - Komnenian restoration
- Battle of Dubravnica – 1380 or 1381 – Serbian-Ottoman wars (Ottoman wars in Europe)
- Battle of Pločnik – between 1385 – 1387 – Ottoman conquest of Bosnia and Herzegovina and Serbian-Ottoman wars (Ottoman wars in Europe)
- Siege of Golubac – 1428 – Ottoman–Hungarian wars (Ottoman wars in Europe)
- Siege of Belgrade (1440) – 1440 – Serbian-Ottoman wars (Ottoman wars in Europe)
- Battle of Nish (1443) – 1443 – Crusade of Varna (Crusades, Ottoman–Hungarian wars, Polish–Ottoman Wars and Serbian-Ottoman wars)
- Battle of Kunovica – 1444 – Crusade of Varna (Crusades, Ottoman–Hungarian wars, Polish–Ottoman Wars and Serbian-Ottoman wars)
- Battle of Leskovac – 1454 – Serbian-Ottoman wars (Ottoman wars in Europe)
- Battle of Kruševac – 1454 – Ottoman–Hungarian wars and Serbian-Ottoman wars (Ottoman wars in Europe)
- Siege of Belgrade (1456) – 1456 – Ottoman–Hungarian wars and Serbian-Ottoman wars (Ottoman wars in Europe)
- Siege of Belgrade (1521) – 1521 – Ottoman–Hungarian wars (Ottoman wars in Europe)
- Siege of Šabac (1521) – 1521 – Ottoman–Hungarian wars (Ottoman wars in Europe)
- Battle of Grocka – 1739 – Russo-Turkish War (1735–1739)
- Capture of Belgrade (1739) – 1739 – Russo-Turkish War (1735–1739)
- Battle of Karlóca – 1848 – Hungarian Revolution of 1848
- First siege of Szenttamás – 1848 – Hungarian Revolution of 1848
- Second siege of Szenttamás – 1848 – Hungarian Revolution of 1848
- Battle of Perlasz – 1848 – Hungarian Revolution of 1848
- Third siege of Szenttamás – 1848 – Hungarian Revolution of 1848
- Battle of Jarkovác – 1848 – Hungarian Revolution of 1848
- Battle of Pancsova – 1849 – Hungarian Revolution of 1848
- Fourth siege of Szenttamás – 1849 – Hungarian Revolution of 1848
- Battle of Káty – 1849 – Hungarian Revolution of 1848
- Battle of Kishegyes – 1849 – Hungarian Revolution of 1848

== Seychelles ==
- Battle of Mahé – 1801 – French Revolutionary Wars

== Slovenia ==
- Battle of Poetovio - 388 - Roman civil war
- Battle of the Frigidus – 394 – Roman–Germanic wars
- Battle of Pirano – 1812 – Adriatic campaign of 1807–1814 (Napoleonic Wars)
- Battle of Friedau – 1848 – Hungarian Revolution of 1848
- Battle of Dražgoše – 1942
- Battle of Osankarica
- Battle of Castle Turjak – 1943
- Battle of Nanos – 1942
- Battle of Trieste
- Battle of Poljana – 1945
- Battle of Caporetto – 1917

== South Africa ==
- Battle of Saldanha Bay (1781) – 1781 – Fourth Anglo-Dutch War (American Revolutionary War)
- Battle of Muizenberg – 1795 – French Revolutionary Wars
- Capitulation of Saldanha Bay – 1796 – French Revolutionary Wars
- Action of 9 February 1799 (South Africa) – 1799 – French Revolutionary Wars
- Battle of Blaauwberg – 1806 – War of the Third Coalition (Napoleonic Wars)
- Battle of Gqokli Hill – 1818 – Ndwandwe–Zulu War
- Battle of Amalinde – 1818 – Xhosa Wars
- Battle of Grahamstown – 1819 – Xhosa Wars
- Battle of Mhlatuze River – 1819 or 1820 – Ndwandwe–Zulu War
- Battle of Blood River – 1838 – Great Trek
- Battle of Magango – 1840
- Battle of Isandlwana – 1879 – Anglo-Zulu War
- Battle of Rorke's Drift – 1879 – Anglo-Zulu War
- Battle of Intombe – 1879 – Anglo-Zulu War
- Battle of Hlobane – 1879 – Anglo-Zulu War
- Battle of Kambula – 1879 – Anglo-Zulu War
- Battle of Gingindlovu – 1879 – Anglo-Zulu War
- Siege of Eshowe – 1879 – Anglo-Zulu War
- Battle of Ulundi – 1879 – Anglo-Zulu War
- Action at Bronkhorstspruit – 1880 – First Boer War
- Battle of Laing's Nek – 1881 – First Boer War
- Battle of Majuba Hill – 1881 – First Boer War
- Battle of Schuinshoogte – 1881 – First Boer War
- Battle of Talana Hill – 1899 – Second Boer War
- Battle of Elandslaagte – 1899 – Second Boer War
- Battle of Stormberg – 1899 – Second Boer War
- Battle of Magersfontein – 1899 – Second Boer War
- Battle of Colenso – 1899 – Second Boer War
- Battle of Modder River – 1899 – Second Boer War
- Battle of Faber's Put – 1900 – Second Boer War
- Siege of Kimberley – 1899–1900 – Second Boer War
- Siege of Ladysmith – 1899–1900 – Second Boer War
- Siege of Mafeking – 1899–1900 – Second Boer War
- Battle of Sanna's Post – 1900 – Second Boer War
- Battle of Spion Kop – 1900 – Second Boer War
- Battle of Witpoort – 1900 – Second Boer War
- Battle of Paardeberg – 1900 – Second Boer War

== Spain ==
- Battle of Écija (711) - 711 - Muslim conquest of the Iberian Peninsula
- Battle of Orihuela (713) - 713 - Muslim conquest of the Iberian Peninsula
- Battle of Anceo - 825 - Reconquista
- Battle of the Bridge of Cornellana - 842
- Battle of Jándula - 853 - Reconquista
- Battle of Monte Laturce – ??? – Reconquista
- Raid of 904 in Pallars and Ribagorza – 904 – Reconquista
- Battle of San Esteban de Gormaz (917) – 917 – Reconquista
- Battle of Valdejunquera – 920 – Reconquista
- Battle of Baltarga - 942 - Hungarian invasions of Europe
- Battle of the Cebreiro Mountains - 971 - Viking expansion
- Battle of Estercuel – 975 – Reconquista
- Battle of Torrevicente – 981 – Reconquista
- Battle of Torà – 1003 – Reconquista
- Battle of Graus – 1063 – Reconquista
- Crusade of Barbastro – 1064 – Reconquista
- Battle of Llantada – 1068 – Reconquista
- Battle of Golpejera – 1072 – Reconquista
- Battle of Cabra – 1079 – Reconquista
- Battle of Almenar (1082) - 1082 - Reconquista
- Battle of Piedra Pisada – 1084 – Reconquista
- Battle of Morella – 1084 or 1088 – Reconquista
- Siege of Toledo (1085) - 1085 - Reconquista
- Battle of Sagrajas – 1086 – Reconquista
- Siege of Tudela – 1087 – Reconquista
- Battle of Cuarte - 1094 - Reconquista
- Battle of Alcoraz – 1096 – Reconquista
- Battle of Bairén – 1097 – Reconquista
- Battle of Consuegra – 1097 – Reconquista
- Battle of Mollerussa – 1102 – Reconquista
- Battle of Ibiza (1109) - 1109 - Norwegian Crusade
- Battle of Valtierra - 1110 - Reconquista
- Battle of Candespina – 1111 – Reconquista
- Battle of Martorell (1114) - 1114 - Reconquista
- Battle of Cutanda – 1120 – Reconquista
- Battle of Arnisol - 1126 - Reconquista
- Battle of Corbins - 1126 - Reconquista
- Battle of Fraga – 1134 – Reconquista
- Siege of Coria (1138) – 1138 – Reconquista
- Siege of Oreja – 1139 – Reconquista
- Siege of Coria (1142) – 1142 – Reconquista
- Battle of Montiel (1143) – 1143 – Reconquista
- Battle of Albacete - 1146 - Reconquista
- Siege of Almería (1147) – 1147 – Reconquista
- Siege of Tortosa (1148) – 1148 – Reconquista and Second Crusade (Crusades)
- Battle of Lobregal - 1160
- Battle of Fahs al-Jullab - 1165
- Battle of Alarcos – 1195 – Reconquista
- Siege of Al-Dāmūs – 1210 – Reconquista
- Battle of Las Navas de Tolosa – 1212 – Reconquista
- Siege of Jaén (1225) – 1225 – Reconquista
- Battle of Portopí – 1229 – Conquest of Majorca (Reconquista)
- Siege of Jaén (1230) – 1230 – Reconquista
- Battle of Alange - 1230 - Reconquista
- Battle of Jerez – 1231 – Reconquista
- Siege of Burriana – 1233 – Reconquista
- Siege of Córdoba (1236) – 1236 – Reconquista
- Battle of the Puig – 1237 – Reconquista
- Siege of Jaén (1245–1246) – 1245 – 1246 – Reconquista
- Siege of Seville – 1247 – 1248 – Reconquista
- Siege of Jerez (1261) – 1261 – Reconquista
- Battle of Écija (1275) – 1275 – Reconquista
- Battle of Martos – 1275 – Reconquista
- Battle of Algeciras (1278) – 1278 – Reconquista
- Siege of Algeciras (1278–1279) – 1278 – 1279 – Reconquista
- Battle of Moclín (1280) – 1280 – Reconquista
- Siege of Tudela - 1284
- Setge de Girona de 1285 - 1285 - Aragonese Crusade
- Battle of Alaró Castle - 1285 - Aragonese Crusade
- Battle of Iznalloz – 1295 – Reconquista
- Siege of Algeciras (1309–1310) – 1309 – 1310 – Reconquista
- Siege of Almería (1309) – 1309 – Reconquista
- Battle of the Vega of Granada – 1319 – Reconquista
- Battle of Teba – 1330 – Reconquista
- Battle of Villanueva de Barcarrota - 1336
- Battle of Vega de Pagana – 1339 – Reconquista
- Battle of Río Salado – 1340 – Reconquista
- Battle of Guadalmesí - 1342
- Battle of Estepona – 1342 – Reconquista
- Siege of Algeciras (1342–1344) – 1342 – 1344 – Reconquista
- Battle of Épila - 1348
- Battle of Mislata - 1348
- Battle of Llucmajor - 1349
- Battle of Barcelona (1359) – 1359 – War of the Two Peters (Hundred Years' War)
- Battle of Araviana – 1359 – War of the Two Peters and Castilian Civil War (both part of the Hundred Years' War)
- Battle of Linuesa – 1361 – Reconquista
- Battle of Guadix – 1362 – Reconquista
- Battle of Nájera or Battle of Navarrete – 1367 – Castilian Civil War (Hundred Years' War)
- Siege of León (1368) – Castilian Civil War (Hundred Years' War)
- Battle of Montiel – 1369 – Reconquista and Castilian Civil War (Hundred Years' War)
- Siege of Algeciras (1369) – 1369 – Reconquista
- Battle of Valverde (1385) – 1385 – 1383–1385 Portuguese interregnum (Hundred Years' War)
- Nasrid raid on Murcia (1392) – 1392 – Reconquista
- Battle of Collejares – 1406 – Reconquista
- Battle of Morvedre - 1412 - Count of Urgell's revolt
- Conquest of Ceuta – 1415 – Moroccan–Portuguese conflicts (Portuguese Empire) and Reconquista
- Siege of Ceuta (1419) – 1419 – Moroccan–Portuguese conflicts (Portuguese Empire) and Reconquista
- Battle of La Higueruela – 1431 – Reconquista
- First Battle of Olmedo - 1445 - Castilian Civil War of 1437–1445
- Battle of Hellín - 1448 - Reconquista
- Battle of Aibar - 1451 - Navarrese Civil War (1451–1455)
- Battle of Los Alporchones – 1452 – Reconquista
- Battle of Rafal Garcés - 1452
- Battle of Calaf - 1465 - Catalan Civil War
- Second Battle of Olmedo - 1467
- Siege of Burgos (1475) – 1475 – War of the Castilian Succession
- Battle of Toro – 1476 – War of the Castilian Succession
- Battle of Lucena – 1483 – Granada War (Reconquista)
- Siege of Málaga (1487) – 1487 – Granada War (Reconquista)
- Battle of Granada - 1492 - Reconquista
- First Battle of Acentejo – 1494
- Battle of Aguere – 1494
- Second Battle of Acentejo – 1494
- Conquest of Melilla – 1497 – Reconquista
- Battle of Tordesillas (1520) – 1520 – Revolt of the Comuneros
- Siege of Segovia - 1520 - Revolt of the Comuneros
- Battle of El Romeral - 1521 Revolt of the Comuneros
- Battle of Miñano Mayor - 1521 - Revolt of the Comuneros
- Battle of Villalar – 1521 – Revolt of the Comuneros
- Battle of Pampeluna – 1521 – Italian War of 1521–1526 (Italian Wars)
- Siege of Logroño - 1521 - Italian War of 1521–1526
- Battle of Noáin or Battle of Esquiroz – 1521 – Italian War of 1521–1526 (Italian Wars)
- Battle of San Marcial - 1522 - Post-War of the League of Cambrai
- Siege of Fuenterrabía (1523–1524) – 1523 – 1524 – Italian War of 1521–1526 (Italian Wars)
- Battle of Formentera - 1529 - Habsburg–Ottoman wars in Hungary (1526–1568)
- Sack of Mahón - 1535 - Spanish–Ottoman wars
- Battle of Alborán - 1540 - Ottoman–Habsburg wars
- Battle of Muros Bay – 1543 – Italian War of 1542–1546 (Italian Wars)
- Battle of the Bay of Velez - 1553 - Ottoman–Portuguese conflicts (1538–1560)
- Raid of the Balearic islands (1558) - 1558 - Italian War of 1551–1559
- Battle of Gibraltar (1607) – 1607 – Eighty Years' War, 1599–1609 (Eighty Years' War) [European wars of religion]
- Battle of Gibraltar (1618) – 1618 – Eighty Years' War (European wars of religion)
- Battle of Gibraltar (1621) – 1621 – Eighty Years' War, 1621–1648 (Eighty Years' War and Thirty Years' War) [European wars of religion]
- Siege of Fuenterrabía (1638) – 1638 – Franco-Spanish War (1635–1659) (Thirty Years' War)
- Battle of Getaria – 1638 – Franco-Spanish War (1635–1659) (Thirty Years' War)
- Battle of Cádiz (1640) – 1640 – Franco-Spanish War (1635–1659) (Thirty Years' War)
- Battle of Cambrils – 1640 – Reapers' War (Franco-Spanish War (1635–1659)) [Thirty Years' War]
- Battle of Martorell (1641) – 1641 – Reapers' War (Franco-Spanish War (1635–1659)) [Thirty Years' War]
- Battle of Montjuïc (1641) – 1641 – Reapers' War (Franco-Spanish War (1635–1659)) [Thirty Years' War]
- Naval battle of Tarragona – 1641 – Reapers' War (Franco-Spanish War (1635–1659)) [Thirty Years' War]
- Battle of Tarragona (August 1641) – 1641 – Reapers' War (Franco-Spanish War (1635–1659)) [Thirty Years' War]
- Battle of Montmeló – 1642 – Reapers' War and (Franco-Spanish War (1635–1659)) [Thirty Years' War]
- Battle of Barcelona – 1642 – Reapers' War (Franco-Spanish War (1635–1659)) [Thirty Years' War]
- Battle of Lleida (1642) – 1642 – Reapers' War (Franco-Spanish War (1635–1659)) [Thirty Years' War]
- Battle of Cartagena (1643) – 1643 – Franco-Spanish War (1635–1659) (Thirty Years' War)
- Siege of Lleida (1644) – 1644 – Reapers' War (Franco-Spanish War (1635–1659)) [Thirty Years' War]
- Action of 23 November 1650 – 1650 – Franco-Spanish War (1635–1659) (Thirty Years' War)
- Capture of the galleon Lion Couronné – 1651 – Franco-Spanish War (1635–1659) (Thirty Years' War)
- Siege of Barcelona (1651) – 1651 – 1652 – Reapers' War (Franco-Spanish War (1635–1659)) [Thirty Years' War]
- Raid on Málaga (1656) – 1656 – Anglo-Spanish War (1654–1660) (Franco-Spanish War (1635–16)59)) [Thirty Years' War]
- Battle of Cádiz (1656) – 1656 – Anglo-Spanish War (1654–1660) (Franco-Spanish War (1635–1)659)) [Thirty Years' War]
- Battle of Santa Cruz de Tenerife (1657) – 1657 – Anglo-Spanish War (1654–1660) (Franco-Spanish War (1635–1659)) [Thirty Years' War]
- Sieges of Ceuta (1694–1727) – 1694 – 1720 and 1721 – 1727
- Siege of San Sebastián (1719) – 1719 – War of the Quadruple Alliance
- Capture of Vigo – 1719 – War of the Quadruple Alliance
- Action of 11 March 1727 – 1727 – Anglo-Spanish War (1727–1729)
- Action of 8 April 1740 – 1740 – War of Jenkins' Ear (War of the Austrian Succession)
- Attacks on Fuerteventura in 1740 – 1740 – War of Jenkins' Ear (War of the Austrian Succession)
- Siege of Fort St Philip (1756) – 1756 – Seven Years' War
- Battle of Minorca (1756) – 1756 – Seven Years' War
- Battle of Cartagena (1758) – 1758 – Seven Years' War
- Action of 29 April 1758 – 1758 – Seven Years' War
- Battle of Valencia de Alcántara – 1762 – Spanish invasion of Portugal (1762) (Fantastic War) [Seven Years' War]
- Frigate action of 29 May 1794 – 1794 – Atlantic campaign of May 1794 (War of the First Coalition) [French Revolutionary Wars]
- Battle of the Gulf of Roses – 1795 – War of the First Coalition (French Revolutionary Wars)
- Action of 13 October 1796 – 1796 – Mediterranean campaign of 1793–1796 (War of the First Coalition) and Anglo-Spanish War (1796–1808) [French Revolutionary and Napoleonic Wars]
- Action of 19 December 1796 – 1796 – Mediterranean campaign of 1793–1796 (War of the First Coalition) and Anglo-Spanish War (1796–1808) [French Revolutionary and Napoleonic Wars]
- Action of 25 January 1797 – 1797 – Anglo-Spanish War (1796–1808) (French Revolutionary and Napoleonic Wars)
- Action of 26 April 1797 – 1797 – Anglo-Spanish War (1796–1808) (French Revolutionary and Napoleonic Wars)
- Assault on Cádiz (1797) – 1797 – Anglo-Spanish War (1796–1808) (French Revolutionary and Napoleonic Wars)
- Battle of Santa Cruz de Tenerife (1797) – 1797 – Anglo-Spanish War (1796–1808) (French Revolutionary and Napoleonic Wars)
- Action of 15 July 1798 – 1798 – Mediterranean campaign of 1798 (War of the Second Coalition) and Anglo-Spanish War (1796–1808) [French Revolutionary and Napoleonic Wars]
- Capture of Minorca (1798) – 1798 – Mediterranean campaign of 1798 (War of the Second Coalition) and Anglo-Spanish War (1796–1808) [French Revolutionary and Napoleonic Wars]
- Action of 6 February 1799 – 1799 – Anglo-Spanish War (1796–1808) (French Revolutionary and Napoleonic Wars)
- Action of 7 July 1799 – 1799 – Anglo-Spanish War (1796–1808) (French Revolutionary and Napoleonic Wars)
- Action of 16 October 1799 – 1799 – Anglo-Spanish War (1796–1808) (French Revolutionary and Napoleonic Wars)
- Action of 7 April 1800 – 1800 – Anglo-Spanish War (1796–1808) (French Revolutionary and Napoleonic Wars)
- Battle of Brion – 1800 – Anglo-Spanish War (1796–1808) (French Revolutionary and Napoleonic Wars)
- Action of 10 December 1800 – 1800 – Anglo-Spanish War (1796–1808) (French Revolutionary and Napoleonic Wars)
- Action of 6 May 1801 – 1801 – Anglo-Spanish War (1796–1808) (French Revolutionary and Napoleonic Wars)
- First Battle of Algeciras – 1801 – Anglo-Spanish War (1796–1808) and War of the Second Coalition (French Revolutionary and Napoleonic Wars)
- Second Battle of Algeciras – 1801 – Anglo-Spanish War (1796–1808) and War of the Second Coalition (French Revolutionary and Napoleonic Wars)
- Action of 25 November 1804 – 1804 – Anglo-Spanish War (1796–1808) (French Revolutionary and Napoleonic Wars)
- Battle of Cape Finisterre (1805) – 1805 – Anglo-Spanish War (1796–1808) and Trafalgar campaign (War of the Third Coalition) [French Revolutionary and Napoleonic Wars]
- Action of 10 August 1805 – 1805 – Trafalgar campaign (War of the Third Coalition) [Napoleonic Wars]
- Battle of Trafalgar – 1805 – Anglo-Spanish War (1796–1808) and Trafalgar campaign (War of the Third Coalition) [French Revolutionary and Napoleonic Wars]
- Battle of Cape Ortegal – 1805 – Trafalgar campaign (War of the Third Coalition) [Napoleonic Wars]
- Action of 4 April 1808 – 1808 – Anglo-Spanish War (1796–1808) (French Revolutionary and Napoleonic Wars)
- Peninsular War (12–18 October 1807 – 4 June 1814), see Timeline of the Peninsular War
- Battle off Cape Gata – 1815 – Second Barbary War
- Battle of Cape Palos (1815) – 1815 – Second Barbary War
- First Carlist War (1833–1840), see First Carlist War § Chronology of battles
- Spanish Civil War (1936–1939), see List of battles in the Spanish Civil War

== Sri Lanka ==
- Siege of Kotte (1557–1558) – 1557 – 1558 – Sinhalese–Portuguese War (Crisis of the Sixteenth Century)
- Battle of Mulleriyawa – 1559 – Sinhalese–Portuguese War (Crisis of the Sixteenth Century)
- Siege of Colombo – 1587 – 1588 – Sinhalese–Portuguese War (Crisis of the Sixteenth Century)
- Battle of Randeniwela – 1630 – Sinhalese–Portuguese War (Crisis of the Sixteenth Century)
- Battle of Gannoruwa – 1638 – Sinhalese–Portuguese War (Crisis of the Sixteenth Century)
- Siege of Galle (1640) – 1640 – Sinhalese–Portuguese War (Crisis of the Sixteenth Century) and Dutch–Portuguese War
- Action of 23 March 1654 – 1654 – Dutch–Portuguese War
- Action of 2 May 1654 – 1654 – Dutch–Portuguese War
- Capture of Trincomalee – 1782 – Fourth Anglo-Dutch War (American Revolutionary War)
- Battle of Providien – 1782 – Anglo-French War (1778–1783) (American Revolutionary War)
- Action of 12 August 1782 – 1782 – American Revolutionary War
- Battle of Trincomalee – 1782 – American Revolutionary War

== Sudan ==
- Battle of Suakin (1541) – 1541 – Ottoman–Portuguese conflicts (1538–1559) (Ottoman–Portuguese confrontations)

== Suriname ==
- Recapture of Fort Zeelandia (1667) – 1667 – Second Anglo-Dutch War (Anglo-Dutch Wars)
- Battle of Suriname – 1804

== Sweden ==
- For wars between Denmark and Sweden, see list of wars between Denmark and Sweden
- Battle at Lake Vænir
- Battle on the Ice of Lake Vänern - 530
- Battle of Fotevik – 1134 – Danish Civil Wars
- Pillage of Sigtuna - 1187 - Swedish–Novgorodian Wars
- Battle of Lena - 1208 - Dano-Swedish wars
- Battle of Skanör – 1289 - War of the Outlaws
- Battle of Visby - 1361 - Danish–Hanseatic War (1361–1370)
- Battle of Helsingborg (1362) - 1362 - Danish–Hanseatic War (1361–1370)
- Siege of Älvsborg (1439) - 1439 - Eric of Pomerania's War against Sweden
- Battle of Brunkeberg – 1471 – Dano-Swedish War (1470–1471)
- Battle of Falun – 1521 – Swedish War of Liberation (Dano-Swedish War)
- Battle of Brunnbäck Ferry – 1521 – Swedish War of Liberation (Dano-Swedish War)
- Battle of Västerås – 1521 – Swedish War of Liberation (Dano-Swedish War)
- Conquest of Uppsala – 1521 – Swedish War of Liberation (Dano-Swedish War)
- Conquest of Kalmar – 1523 – Swedish War of Liberation (Dano-Swedish War)
- Conquest of Stockholm – 1523 – Swedish War of Liberation (Dano-Swedish War)
- Capture of Älvsborg - 1563 - Northern Seven Years' War
- Battle of Öland (1563) – 1563 – Northern Seven Years' War (Dano-Swedish War and Polish–Swedish wars)
- Battle of Mared – 1563 – Northern Seven Years' War (Dano-Swedish War and Polish–Swedish wars)
- First battle of Öland (1564) – 1564 – Northern Seven Years' War (Dano-Swedish War and Polish–Swedish wars)
- Action of 14 August 1564 – 1564 – Northern Seven Years' War (Dano-Swedish War and Polish–Swedish wars)
- Battle of Axtorna – 1565 – Northern Seven Years' War (Dano-Swedish War and Polish–Swedish wars)
- Action of 26 July 1566 – 1566 – Northern Seven Years' War (Dano-Swedish War and Polish–Swedish wars)
- Battle of Brobacka – 1566 – Northern Seven Years' War (Dano-Swedish War and Polish–Swedish wars)
- Siege of Varberg – 1569 – Northern Seven Years' War (Dano-Swedish War and Polish–Swedish wars)
- Battle of Stegeborg – 1598 – War against Sigismund
- Battle of Stångebro – 1598 – War against Sigismund
- Siege of Kalmar – 1611 – Kalmar War
- Storming of Kristianopel – 1611 – Kalmar War
- Battle of Vittsjö – 1612 – Kalmar War
- Battle of Bysjön – 1644 – Torstenson War (Thirty Years' War)
- Battle of the Sound – 1658 – Second Northern War (Northern Wars)
- Battle of Öland – 1676 – Scanian War (Franco-Dutch War and Northern Wars)
- Battle of Halmstad – 1676 – Scanian War (Franco-Dutch War and Northern Wars)
- Battle of Lund – 1676 – Scanian War (Franco-Dutch War and Northern Wars)
- Siege of Malmö – 1677 – Scanian War (Franco-Dutch War and Northern Wars)
- Battle of Marstrand – 1677 – Scanian War (Franco-Dutch War and Northern Wars)
- Battle of Landskrona – 1677 – Scanian War (Franco-Dutch War and Northern Wars)
- Battle of Uddevalla – 1677 – Scanian War (Franco-Dutch War and Northern Wars)
- Battle of Kvistrum – 1788 – Theatre War (Russo-Swedish War (1788–1790))
- Battle of Öland (1789) – 1789 – Russo-Swedish War (1788–1790)

== Switzerland ==
- Battle of Octodurus – 57 BC – 56 BC – Gallic Wars
- Battle of Vindonissa – 298 or 302 – Roman–Germanic wars
- Battle of Winterthur - 919
- First Battle of Ulrichen - 1211
- Battle of Schosshalde - 1289
- Battle of Coffrane - 1296
- Battle of Morgarten – 1315 – Growth of the Old Swiss Confederacy
- Battle of Sempach - 1386 - Growth of the Old Swiss Confederacy
- Battle of Arbedo - 1422 - Transalpine campaigns of the Old Swiss Confederacy
- Battle of Freienbach - 1443 - Old Zurich War
- Battle of Hirzel - 1443 - Old Zurich War
- Battle of St. Jakob an der Sihl - 1443 - Old Zurich War
- Battle of St. Jakob an der Birs - 1444 - Old Zurich War
- Battle of Wolfhalden - 1445 - Old Zurich War
- Battle of Männedorf - 1445 - Old Zurich War
- Battle of Ragaz - 1446 - Old Zurich War
- Battle of Castione – 1449 – Milanese War of Succession (Wars in Lombardy)
- Battle of Giornico - 1478 - Transalpine campaigns of the Old Swiss Confederacy
- Battle of Bruderholz – 1499 – Swabian War
- Battle of Schwaderloh – 1499 – Swabian War
- Battle of Calven – 1499 – Swabian War
- Battle of Dornach – 1499 – Swabian War
- Battle of Kappel - 1531 - Second War of Kappel
- Siege of Rheinfelden (1633) – 1633 – Swedish intervention in the Thirty Years' War (Thirty Years' War)
- Battle of Rheinfelden – 1638 – Thirty Years' War
- Capture of Porrentruy – 1792 – War of the First Coalition (French Revolutionary Wars)
- Battle of Grauholz – 1798 – French invasion of Switzerland (French Revolutionary Wars)
- Battle of Frauenfeld – 1799 – War of the Second Coalition (French Revolutionary Wars)
- Battle of Winterthur – 1799 – War of the Second Coalition (French Revolutionary Wars)
- First Battle of Zurich – 1799 – War of the Second Coalition (French Revolutionary Wars)
- Battle of Oberwald – 1799 – War of the Second Coalition (French Revolutionary Wars)
- Battle of Amsteg – 1799 – War of the Second Coalition (French Revolutionary Wars)
- Battle of Schwyz – 1799 – War of the Second Coalition (French Revolutionary Wars)
- Battle of Gotthard Pass – 1799 – War of the Second Coalition (French Revolutionary Wars)
- Second Battle of Zurich – 1799 – War of the Second Coalition (French Revolutionary Wars)
- Battle of Linth River – 1799 – War of the Second Coalition (French Revolutionary Wars)

== Syria ==
- For battles during the Assyrian Empire era, refer to Military history of the Neo-Assyrian Empire.
- For Nebuchadnezzar II era, refer to Campaigns of Nebuchadnezzar II.
- For battles during the Muslim conquest of the Levant (Arab–Byzantine wars), refer to Military history of Syria: Islamic conquest of Persia.
- For battles during the Arab–Byzantine wars, refer to Military history of Syria: Arab–Byzantine wars.
- For battles during the Crusades, refer to Military history of Syria: Crusades.
- For battles during the Mongol invasions of the Levant, refer to Military history of Syria: Mongol invasions of the Levant.
- For battles during the Timurid conquests and invasions, refer to Military history of Syria: Timurid conquests and invasions

== Tunisia ==
- Siege of Aspis – 255 BC – First Punic War (Punic Wars)
- Battle of Adys – 255 BC – First Punic War (Punic Wars)
- Battle of the Bagradas River (255 BC) – 255 BC – First Punic War (Punic Wars)
- Battle of Cape Hermaeum – 255 BC – First Punic War (Punic Wars)
- Battle of Utica – 240 BC – Mercenary War (Punic Wars)
- Battle of the Bagradas River (240 BC) – 240 BC – Mercenary War (Punic Wars)
- Hamilcar's victory with Naravas – 240 BC – Mercenary War (Punic Wars)
- Battle of the Saw – 238 BC – Mercenary War (Punic Wars)
- Siege of Tunis (Mercenary War) – 238 BC – Mercenary War (Punic Wars)
- Battle of Leptis Parva – 238 BC – Mercenary War (Punic Wars)
- Siege of Utica (204 BC) – 204 BC – Second Punic War (Punic Wars)
- Battle of Utica (203 BC) – 203 BC – Second Punic War (Punic Wars)
- Battle of the Great Plains – 203 BC – Second Punic War (Punic Wars)
- Battle of Zama – 202 BC – Second Punic War (Punic Wars)
- Battle of Oroscopa – 151 BC – Third Punic War (Punic Wars)
- Battle of Lake Tunis – 149 BC – Third Punic War (Punic Wars)
- Battle of Nepheris (149 BC) – 149 BC – Third Punic War (Punic Wars)
- Siege of Carthage (Third Punic War) – c. 149 BC – 146 BC – Third Punic War (Punic Wars)
- Battle of the Port of Carthage – 147 BC – Third Punic War (Punic Wars)
- Battle of Nepheris (147 BC) – 147 BC – Third Punic War (Punic Wars)
- Siege of Zama – 109 BC – Jugurthine War
- Siege of Thala – 108 BC – Jugurthine War
- Battle of Utica (81 BC) – 81 BC – Sulla's civil war
- Battle of Utica (49 BC) – 49 BC – Caesar's civil war
- Battle of the Bagradas (49 BC) – 49 BC – Caesar's civil war
- Battle of Ruspina – 46 BC – Caesar's civil war
- Battle of Ascurum – 46 BC – Caesar's civil war
- Battle of Thapsus – 46 BC – Caesar's civil war
- Battle of Carthage (238) – 238 – Crisis of the Third Century
- Capture of Carthage (439) – 439 – Fall of the Western Roman Empire
- Battle of Cape Bon (468) – 468 – Roman–Germanic wars and Fall of the Western Roman Empire
- Battle of Ad Decimum – 533 – Vandalic War (Roman–Germanic wars)
- Battle of Tricamarum – 533 – Vandalic War (Roman–Germanic wars)
- Battle of Mammes – 534 – Berber Wars
- Battle of Bourgaon – 535 – Berber Wars
- Battle of the Bagradas River (536) – 536 – Berber Wars
- Battle of Thacia – 545 – Moorish wars (Berber Wars)
- Battle of Sufetula (546 or 547) – 546 or 547 – Moorish wars (Berber Wars)
- Battle of Sufetula (647) – 647 – Muslim conquest of the Maghreb (Arab–Byzantine wars)
- Battle of Carthage (698) – 698 – Muslim conquest of the Maghreb (Arab–Byzantine wars)
- Battle of Tabarka – 701 or 702 or 703 – Muslim conquest of the Maghreb (Arab–Byzantine wars)
- Conquest of Tunis (1534) – 1534 – Ottoman–Habsburg wars
- Conquest of Tunis (1535) – 1535 – Ottoman–Portuguese confrontations and Ottoman–Habsburg wars

== Turkey ==
For Anatolian-Turkic States:

- List of wars involving the Sultanate of Rum
- List of wars involving the Ottoman Empire
- Battle of Nihriya – c. 1237 BC
- Fall of Harran – 610 BC – 609 BC – Medo-Babylonian conquest of the Assyrian Empire
- Battle of Carchemish – c. 605 BC – Egyptian–Babylonian wars
- Battle of the Eclipse – 585 BC – Lydo–Median war
- Battle of Pteria – 547 BC – Wars of Cyrus the Great
- Battle of Thymbra – 547 BC – Wars of Cyrus the Great
- Siege of Sardis (547 BC) – 547 BC – Wars of Cyrus the Great
- Siege of Sardis (498 BC) – 498 BC – Ionian Revolt
- Battle of Lade – 494 BC – Ionian Revolt
- Battle of Mycale – 479 BC – Second Persian invasion of Greece (Greco-Persian Wars)
- Battle of the Eurymedon – 469 BC or 466 BC – Wars of the Delian League (Greco-Persian Wars)
- Battle of Cynossema – 411 BC – Peloponnesian War
- Battle of Abydos – 411 BC – Peloponnesian War
- Battle of Cyzicus – 410 BC – Peloponnesian War
- Battle of Notium – 406 BC – Peloponnesian War
- Battle of Arginusae – 406 BC – Peloponnesian War
- Battle of Aegospotami – 405 BC – Peloponnesian War
- Battle of Cnidus – 394 BC – Corinthian War
- Battle of the Granicus – 334 BC – Wars of Alexander the Great
- Siege of Miletus – 334 BC – Wars of Alexander the Great
- Siege of Halicarnassus – 334 BC – Wars of Alexander the Great
- Battle of Issus – 333 BC – Wars of Alexander the Great
- Battle of the Hellespont (321 BC) – 321 BC – First War of the Diadochi
- Battle of Orkynia – 319 BC – Wars of the Diadochi
- Battle of Cretopolis – 319 BC – Wars of the Diadochi
- Battle of Byzantium – 317 BC – Second War of the Diadochi
- Battle of White Tunis – 310 BC – Sicilian Wars
- Battle of Ipsus – 301 BC – Fourth War of the Diadochi
- Battle of Corupedium – 281 BC – Wars of the Diadochi
- Battle of Lysimachia – 277 BC – Celtic settlement of Southeast Europe
- Siege of Sardis (213 BC) – 213 BC
- Battle of Lade (201 BCE) – 201 BC – Cretan War (205–200 BC)
- Battle of Corycus – 191 BC – Roman–Seleucid War (Macedonian Wars)
- Battle of the Eurymedon (190 BC) – 190 BC – Roman–Seleucid War (Macedonian Wars)
- Battle of Myonessus – 190 BC – Roman–Seleucid War (Macedonian Wars)
- Battle of Magnesia – 190 BC or 189 BC – Roman–Seleucid War (Macedonian Wars)
- Battle of the Oenoparus – 145 BC – Syrian Wars
- Battle of the River Amnias – 89 BC – First Mithridatic War (Mithridatic Wars)
- Battle of Protopachium – 89 BC – First Mithridatic War (Mithridatic Wars)
- Battle of Mount Scorobas – 88 BC – First Mithridatic War (Mithridatic Wars)
- Battle of Tenedos (86 BC) – 86 BC – First Mithridatic War (Mithridatic Wars)
- Battle of Halys – 82 BC – Second Mithridatic War (Mithridatic Wars)
- Battle of Chalcedon (74 BC) – 74 BC – Third Mithridatic War (Mithridatic Wars)
- Siege of Cyzicus – 73 BC – Third Mithridatic War (Mithridatic Wars)
- Battle of the Rhyndacus (73 BC) – 73 BC – Third Mithridatic War (Mithridatic Wars)
- Siege of Heraclea – 72 BC – 71 BC – Third Mithridatic War (Mithridatic Wars)
- Battle of Cabira – 72 BC – Third Mithridatic War (Mithridatic Wars)
- Battle of Tigranocerta – 69 BC – Third Mithridatic War (Mithridatic Wars)
- Battle of Zela (67 BC) – 67 BC – Third Mithridatic War (Mithridatic Wars)
- Battle of the Lycus – 66 BC – Third Mithridatic War (Mithridatic Wars)
- Battle of Carrhae – 53 BC – Roman–Parthian Wars
- Battle of Nicopolis (48 BC) – 48 BC – Caesar's civil war
- Battle of Zela – 47 BC – Caesar's civil war
- Battle of the Cilician Gates – 39 BC – Pompeian–Parthian invasion of 40 BC (Roman–Parthian Wars)
- Battle of Amanus Pass – 39 BC – Pompeian–Parthian invasion of 40 BC (Roman–Parthian Wars)
- Battle of Issus (194) – 194 – Year of the Five Emperors
- Battle of Nisibis (217) – 217 – Parthian war of Caracalla (Roman–Parthian Wars)
- Siege of Nisibis (235) – 235 or 237 – Roman–Persian Wars
- Siege of Nisibis (252) – 252 – Roman–Persian Wars
- Siege of Antioch (253) – 253 – Roman–Persian Wars
- Battle of Edessa – 260 – Roman–Persian Wars
- Siege of Caesarea Cappadocia (260) – 260 – Roman–Persian Wars
- Siege of Tyana (272) – 272 – Palmyrene War
- Battle of Immae – 272 – Crisis of the Third Century
- Battle of Satala (298) – 298 – Roman–Persian Wars
- Battle of Tzirallum – 313 – Civil wars of the Tetrarchy
- Battle of Adrianople (324) – 324 – Civil wars of the Tetrarchy
- Battle of the Hellespont – 324 – Civil wars of the Tetrarchy
- Battle of Chrysopolis – 324 – Civil wars of the Tetrarchy
- Siege of Nisibis (337) - 337 - Perso-Roman wars of 337–361
- Siege of Nisibis (338) - 338 - Perso-Roman wars of 337–361
- Siege of Nisibis (346) - 346 - Perso-Roman wars of 337–361
- Siege of Nisibis (350) - 350 - Perso-Roman wars of 337–361
- Siege of Amida (359) – 359 – Perso-Roman wars of 337–361 (Roman–Persian Wars)
- Shapur II's siege of Bezabde – 360 – Perso-Roman wars of 337–361 (Roman–Persian Wars)
- Constantius II's siege of Bezabde – 360 – Perso-Roman wars of 337–361 (Roman–Persian Wars)
- Battle of Thyatira – 366 – Procopius's Rebellion
- Battle of Bagavan – 371
- Battle of Adrianople – 378 – Gothic War (376–382) (Fall of the Western Roman Empire) and Roman–Germanic wars
- Siege of Adrianople (378) – 378 – Gothic War (376–382) (Fall of the Western Roman Empire) and Roman–Germanic wars
- Battle of Constantinople (378) – 378 – Gothic War (376–382) (Fall of the Western Roman Empire) and Roman–Germanic wars
- Battle of Cotyaeum - 492 - Isaurian War
- Siege of Amida (502–503) - 502 - Anastasian War
- Battle of Dara – 530 – Iberian War
- Battle of Satala (530) – 530 – Iberian War
- Siege of Martyropolis (531) – 531 – Iberian War
- Battle of Nisibis (541) – 541 – Belisarius invasion of Mesopotamia
- Siege of Edessa (544) - 544 - Lazic War
- Battle of Melantias - 559 - Byzantine-Kutrigurs war 558–559
- Siege of Nisibis (573) – 573 – Byzantine–Sasanian War of 572–591 (Roman–Persian Wars)
- Siege of Dara (573) – 573 – Byzantine–Sasanian War of 572–591 (Roman–Persian Wars)
- Battle of Melitene (576) - 576 - Byzantine–Sasanian War of 572–591
- Battle of Solachon – 586 – Byzantine–Sasanian War of 572–591 (Roman–Persian Wars)
- Siege of Mardin - 586 - Byzantine–Sasanian War of 572–591
- Battle of Martyropolis (588) – 588 – Byzantine–Sasanian War of 572–591 (Roman–Persian Wars)
- Battle of Antioch (613) – 613 – Byzantine–Sasanian War of 602–628 (Roman–Persian Wars)
- Battle of Sarus – 625 – Byzantine–Sasanian War of 602–628 (Roman–Persian Wars)
- Siege of Constantinople (626) – 626 – Avar–Byzantine wars and Byzantine–Sasanian War of 602–628 (Roman–Persian Wars)
- Battle of the Iron Bridge – 637 – Muslim conquest of the Levant (Arab–Byzantine wars)
- Siege of Germanicia – 638 – Muslim conquest of the Levant (Arab–Byzantine wars)
- Battle of the Masts – 655 – Arab–Byzantine wars
- Siege of Constantinople (674–678) – 674 – 678 – Arab–Byzantine wars
- Battle of Sebastopolis – 692 – Arab–Byzantine wars
- Siege of Tyana – 707 – 708 or 708 – 709 – Arab–Byzantine wars
- Siege of Constantinople (717–718) – 717 – 718 – Arab–Byzantine wars
- Siege of Nicaea (727) – 727 – Arab–Byzantine wars
- Battle of Akroinon – 740 – Arab–Byzantine wars
- Battle of the Long Walls - 756
- Siege of Kamacha – 766 – Arab–Byzantine wars
- Battle of Litosoria - 774 - Byzantine–Bulgarian Wars
- Battle of Bagrevand - 775
- Battle of Kopidnadon – 788 – Arab–Byzantine wars
- Battle of Krasos – 804 – Arab–Byzantine wars
- Siege of Adrianople (813) – 813 – Byzantine–Bulgarian wars
- Battle of Kedouktos - 822 - Rebellion of Thomas the Slav
- Battle of Anzen – 838 – Arab–Byzantine wars
- Sack of Amorium – 838 – Arab–Byzantine wars
- Battle of Mauropotamos – 844 – Arab–Byzantine wars
- Siege of Constantinople (860) – 860 – Rus'–Byzantine War
- Capture of Faruriyyah – 862 – Arab–Byzantine wars
- Battle of Lalakaon – 863 – Arab–Byzantine wars
- Battle of Kardia – c. 872 or 873 – Arab–Byzantine wars
- Battle of Bathys Ryax – 872 or 878 – Arab–Byzantine wars
- Battle of Boulgarophygon – 896 – Byzantine–Bulgarian war of 894–896 (Byzantine–Bulgarian wars)
- Battle of Katasyrtai – 917 – Byzantine–Bulgarian war of 913–927 (Byzantine–Bulgarian wars)
- Battle of Pegae – 921 – Byzantine–Bulgarian war of 913–927 (Byzantine–Bulgarian wars)
- Battle of Constantinople (922) – Byzantine–Bulgarian war of 913–927 (Byzantine–Bulgarian wars)
- Siege of Constantinople - 941 - Rus'-Byzantine Wars
- Battle of Marash (953) – 953 – Arab–Byzantine wars
- Battle of Raban – 958 – Arab–Byzantine wars
- Battle of Andrassos – 960 – Arab–Byzantine wars
- Byzantine conquest of Cilicia – 964 – 965 – Arab–Byzantine wars
- Siege of Antioch (968–969) – 968 – 969 – Arab–Byzantine wars
- Battle of Arcadiopolis (970) – 970 – Sviatoslav's invasion of Bulgaria (Byzantine–Bulgarian wars) and Hungarian invasions of Europe
- Battle of Alexandretta – 971 – Arab–Byzantine wars
- Battle of Pankaleia - 978 - Rebellion of Bardas Skleros
- Battle of Shirimni - 1021 - Byzantine–Georgian wars
- Battle of Svindax - 1022 - Byzantine–Georgian wars
- Battle of Kapetron – 1048 – Byzantine–Seljuk wars and Georgian–Seljuk wars
- Siege of Manzikert (1054) – 1054 – Byzantine–Seljuk wars
- Siege of Ani (1064) – 1064 – Byzantine–Seljuk wars
- Battle of Caesarea – 1067 – Byzantine–Seljuk wars
- Siege of Iconium (1069) – 1069 – Byzantine–Seljuk wars
- Battle of Manzikert – 1071 – Byzantine–Seljuk wars
- Battle of Kalavrye - 1078
- Battle of Levounion - 1091 - Komnenian restoration
- Siege of Xerigordos – 1096 – People's Crusade (First Crusade)
- Battle of Civetot – 1096 – People's Crusade (First Crusade)
- Siege of Nicaea – 1097 – Byzantine–Seljuk wars and First Crusade (Crusades)
- Battle of Dorylaeum (1097) – 1097 – First Crusade (Crusades)
- Siege of Antioch – 1097 – 1098 – First Crusade (Crusades)
- Battle of the Lake of Antioch - 1098 - First Crusade (Crusades)
- Battle of Antioch (1098) – 1098 – First Crusade (Crusades)
- Battle of Harran – 1104 – Crusades
- Battle of Artah – 1105 – Crusades
- Siege of Nicaea (1113) – 1113 – Byzantine–Seljuk wars
- Battle of Philomelion (1116) – 1116 – Byzantine–Seljuk wars
- Siege of Laodicea (1119) – 1119 – Byzantine–Seljuk wars
- Battle of Botora - 1120 - Georgian–Seljuk wars
- Siege of Sozopolis – 1120 – Byzantine–Seljuk wars
- Siege of Edessa (1144) – 1144 – Crusades
- Fall of Saruj – 1145 – Crusades
- Siege of Edessa (1146) – 1146 – Crusades
- Battle of Aintab – 1150 – Crusades
- Fall of Turbessel – 1151 – Byzantine–Seljuk wars
- Siege of Ani (1161) - 1161 - Georgian–Seljuk wars
- Battle of Myriokephalon – 1176 – Byzantine–Seljuk wars
- Battle of Hyelion and Leimocheir – 1177 – Byzantine–Seljuk wars
- Siege of Claudiopolis – 1179 – Byzantine–Seljuk wars
- Battle of Philomelion (1190) – 1190 – Third Crusade (Crusades)
- Battle of Iconium (1190) – 1190 – Third Crusade (Crusades)
- Battle of Arcadiopolis (1194) – 1194 – Battles of the Second Bulgarian Empire (Byzantine–Bulgarian wars)
- Battle of Basian – 1202 – Georgian–Seljuk wars
- Siege of Constantinople (1203) – 1203 – Fourth Crusade (Crusades)
- Sack of Constantinople – 1204 – Fourth Crusade (Crusades)
- Battle of Adramyttion (1205) - 1205 - Nicaean–Latin wars
- Battle of Adrianople (1205) – 1205 – Bulgarian–Latin wars
- Siege of Trebizond (1205–1206) – 1205 – 1206 – Byzantine–Seljuk wars
- Battle of Rusion – 1206 – Bulgarian–Latin wars
- Battle of Rodosto – 1206 – Bulgarian–Latin wars
- Siege of Antalya – 1207 – Byzantine–Seljuk wars
- Battle of Antioch on the Meander – 1211 – Byzantine–Seljuk wars
- Battle of the Rhyndacus (1211) - 1211 - Nicaean–Latin wars
- Siege of Sinope – 1214 – Byzantine–Seljuk wars
- Siege of Alanya (1221) – 1221 – Byzantine–Seljuk wars
- Siege of Trebizond (1222–1223) – 1222 – 1223 – Byzantine–Seljuk wars
- Battle of Poimanenon - 1224 - Nicaean-Latin Wars
- Battle of Yassıçemen - 1230 - Battles involving Jalal al-Din
- Siege of Constantinople (1235) – 1235 – Bulgarian–Latin wars
- Battle of Constantinople (1241) - 1241 - Nicaean-Latin Wars
- Battle of Köse Dağ – 1243 – Mongol invasions of Anatolia
- Battle of Adrianople (1254) – 1254 – Battles of the Second Bulgarian Empire (Byzantine–Bulgarian wars)
- Siege of Constantinople (1260) - 1260 - Nicaean-Latin Wars
- Reconquest of Constantinople - 1261 - Nicaean-Latin Wars
- Battle of Mari - 1266 - Wars of Cilician Armenia
- Siege of Antioch (1268) – 1268 – Crusades
- Battle of Elbistan – 1277 – Mongol invasions of the Levant
- Siege of Trebizond (1282) - 1282 - Byzantine–Georgian wars
- Siege of Kulaca Hisar – 1285 – Byzantine–Ottoman wars
- Battle of Bapheus – 1302 – Byzantine–Ottoman wars
- Battle of Dimbos – 1303 – Byzantine–Ottoman wars
- Battle of the Cyzicus – 1303 – Catalan campaign in Asia Minor (Catalan Company)
- Battle of Apros – 1305 – Catalan Company
- Battle of Gallipoli (1312) - 1312
- Battle of Pelekanon – 1329 – Byzantine–Ottoman wars
- Battle of Sırpsındığı – 1364 – Serbian-Ottoman wars (Ottoman wars in Europe)
- Battle of Ankara or Battle of Angora – 1402 – Timurid conquests and invasions
- Siege of Smyrna – 1402 – Timurid conquests and invasions
- Battle of Gallipoli (1416) – 1416 – Ottoman–Venetian wars
- Siege of Constantinople (1422) – 1422 – Byzantine–Ottoman wars
- Fall of Constantinople – 1453 – Byzantine–Ottoman wars
- Siege of Trebizond (1461) – 1461 – Byzantine–Ottoman wars
- Battle of Chapakchur – 1467 – Qara Qoyunlu–Aq Qoyunlu Wars
- Battle of Otlukbeli – 1473 – Ottoman-Aq Qoyunlu wars
- Battle of Yenişehir (1481) - 1481
- Adana campaign - 1485 - Ottoman–Mamluk War (1485–1491)
- Battle of Aga-Cayiri - 1488 - Ottoman–Mamluk War (1485–1491)
- Battle of Erzincan (1507) – 1507 – Ottoman–Persian Wars
- Capture of Bayburt (1514) – 1514 – Ottoman–Persian Wars
- Battle of Tekiryaylağı – 1515 – Ottoman–Persian Wars
- Siege of Harput (1516) – 1516 – Ottoman–Persian Wars
- Battle of Koçhisar – 1516 – Ottoman–Persian Wars
- Battle of Çıldır – 1578 – Ottoman–Safavid War (1578–1590) (Ottoman–Persian Wars)
- Action of 26 May 1646 – 1646 – Cretan War (1645–1669) (Ottoman–Venetian wars)
- Battle of Focchies – 1649 – Cretan War (1645–1669) (Ottoman–Venetian wars)
- Battle of the Dardanelles (1654) – 1654 – Cretan War (1645–1669) (Ottoman–Venetian wars)
- Battle of the Dardanelles (1655) – 1655 – Cretan War (1645–1669) (Ottoman–Venetian wars)
- Battle of the Dardanelles (1656) – 1656 – Cretan War (1645–1669) (Ottoman–Venetian wars)
- Battle of the Dardanelles (1657) – 1657 – Cretan War (1645–1669) (Ottoman–Venetian wars)
- Battle of Imbros (1717) – 1717 – Ottoman–Venetian War (1714–1718)
- Dardanelles operation – 1807 – Anglo-Turkish War (1807–1809)
- Battle of the Dardanelles (1807) – 1807 – Russo-Turkish War (1806–1812)
- Battle of Erzurum (1821) – 1821 – Ottoman–Persian War (1821–1823)
- Siege of Kars (1828) – 1828 – Russo-Turkish War (1828–1829)
- Battle of Konya – 1832 – Egyptian–Ottoman War (1831–1833)
- Battle of Nezib – 1839 – Egyptian–Ottoman War (1839–1841)

== Turkmenistan ==
- Battle of Oxus River – 651 – Muslim conquest of Khorasan (Muslim conquest of Persia)
- Battle of Dandanaqan – 1040 – Seljuk-Ghaznavid Wars
- Siege of Gurganj – 1221 – Mongol invasion of the Khwarazmian Empire
- Siege of Merv (1221) – 1221 – Mongol invasion of the Khwarazmian Empire
- Battle of Marv or Battle of Merv – 1510 – Persian–Uzbek wars

== Ukraine ==
- Battle of Lake Maeotis – 309 BC – Bosporan Civil War
- Battle of Southern Buh – 896 – Byzantine–Bulgarian war of 894–896 (Byzantine–Bulgarian wars)
- List of wars involving Kievan Rus'
  - Siege of Kiev (968) – 968
  - Battle of the Alta River – 1068
  - Battle of the Stuhna River – 1093
- Battle of Sudak – 1221 or 1222 – Byzantine–Seljuk wars
- Battle of the Kalka River – 1223 – Mongol invasion of Kievan Rus'
- List of battles of the Mongol invasion of Kievan Rus' (1237–1242), including Siege of Kiev (1240)
- List of wars and battles involving Galicia–Volhynia (1199–1392)
- List of battles of the Great Troubles (1359–1381/2), including Battle of Blue Waters
- Battle of the Vorskla River – 1399
- Battle of Cătlăbuga – 1485 – Moldavian–Ottoman Wars (Ottoman wars in Europe)
- Battle of Novhorod-Siverskyi – 1604 – Time of Troubles (False Dmitry I)
- Battle of Khotyn (1621) – 1621 – Polish–Ottoman War (1620–1621) (Polish–Ottoman Wars)
- Battle of Ochmatów (1644) – 1644
- Battle of Zhovti Vody – 1648 – Khmelnytsky Uprising (Deluge (history))
- Battle of Korsuń – 1648 – Khmelnytsky Uprising (Deluge (history))
- Battle of Starokostiantyniv – 1648 – Khmelnytsky Uprising (Deluge (history))
- Battle of Pyliavtsi – 1648 – Khmelnytsky Uprising (Deluge (history))
- Siege of Zbarazh – 1649 – Khmelnytsky Uprising (Deluge (history))
- Battle of Zboriv (1649) – 1649 – Khmelnytsky Uprising (Deluge (history))
- Battle of Krasne – 1651 – Khmelnytsky Uprising (Deluge (history))
- Battle of Kopychyntsi – 1651 – Khmelnytsky Uprising (Deluge (history))
- Battle of Berestechko – 1651 – Khmelnytsky Uprising (Deluge (history))
- Battle of Bila Tserkva (1651) – 1651 – Khmelnytsky Uprising (Deluge (history))
- Battle of Batoh – 1652 – Khmelnytsky Uprising (Deluge (history))
- Battle of Zhvanets – 1653 – Khmelnytsky Uprising (Deluge (history))
- Battle of Okhmativ (1655) – 1655 – Russo-Polish War (1654–1667) (Polish-Russian Wars)
- Battle of Horodok (1655) – 1655 – Russo-Polish War (1654–1667) (Polish-Russian Wars)
- Battle of Magierów – 1657 – Deluge (history) and Second Northern War (Northern Wars)
- Battle of Czarny Ostrów – 1657 – Deluge (history) and Second Northern War (Northern Wars)
- Battle of Skałat – 1657 – Deluge (history) and Second Northern War (Northern Wars)
- Battle of Konotop (1659) – 1659 – Russo-Polish War (1654–1667) (Polish-Russian Wars)
- Battle of Lyubar – 1660 – Russo-Polish War (1654–1667) (Polish-Russian Wars)
- Battle of Slobodyshche – 1660 – Russo-Polish War (1654–1667) (Polish-Russian Wars)
- Battle of Chudnov – 1660 – Russo-Polish War (1654–1667) (Polish-Russian Wars)
- Siege of Hlukhiv – 1664 – Russo-Polish War (1654–1667) (Polish-Russian Wars)
- Battle of Stavishche – 1664 – Russo-Polish War (1654–1667) (Polish-Russian Wars)
- Battle of Podhajce (1667) – 1667 – Polish–Cossack–Tatar War (1666–1671)
- Battle of Ładyżyn – 1672 – Polish–Ottoman War (1672–1676) (Polish–Ottoman Wars)
- Siege of Kamenets – 1672 – Polish–Ottoman War (1672–1676) (Polish–Ottoman Wars)
- Battle of Niemirów – 1672 – Polish–Ottoman War (1672–1676) (Polish–Ottoman Wars)
- Battle of Komarno – 1672 – Polish–Ottoman War (1672–1676) (Polish–Ottoman Wars)
- Battle of Khotyn (1673) – 1673 – Polish–Ottoman War (1672–1676) (Polish–Ottoman Wars)
- Battle of Lwów (1675) – 1675 – Polish–Ottoman War (1672–1676) (Polish–Ottoman Wars)
- Battle of Trembowla – 1675 – Polish–Ottoman War (1672–1676) (Polish–Ottoman Wars)
- Battle of Żurawno – 1676 – Polish–Ottoman War (1672–1676) (Polish–Ottoman Wars)
- Battle of Hodów – 1694 – Polish–Ottoman War (1683–1699) (Great Turkish War)
- Battle of Ustechko – 1694 – Polish–Ottoman War (1683–1699) (Great Turkish War)
- Battle of Podhajce (1698) – 1698 – Polish–Ottoman War (1683–1699) (Great Turkish War)
- Storming of Lemberg – 1704 – Swedish invasion of Poland (1701–1706) (Great Northern War) [Northern Wars]
- Battle of Desna – 1708 – Swedish invasion of Russia (Great Northern War) [Northern Wars]
- Sack of Baturyn – 1708 – Swedish invasion of Russia (Great Northern War) [Northern Wars]
- Siege of Veprik – 1709 – Swedish invasion of Russia (Great Northern War) [Northern Wars]
- Battle of Oposhnya – 1709 – Swedish invasion of Russia (Great Northern War) [Northern Wars]
- Battle of Krasnokutsk–Gorodnoye – 1709 – Swedish invasion of Russia (Great Northern War) [Northern Wars]
- Battle of Sokolki – 1709 – Swedish invasion of Russia (Great Northern War) [Northern Wars]
- Battle of Poltava – 1709 – Swedish invasion of Russia (Great Northern War) [Northern Wars]
- Surrender at Perevolochna – 1709 – Swedish invasion of Russia (Great Northern War) [Northern Wars]
- Siege of Perekop (1736) – 1736 – Russo-Turkish War (1735–1739)
- Siege of Ochakov (1737) – 1737 – Russo-Turkish War (1735–1739)
- Battle of Stavuchany – 1739 – Russo-Turkish War (1735–1739)
- Siege of Bar – 1768 – Bar Confederation
- Battle of Kerch Strait (1774) – 1774 – Russo-Turkish War (1768–1774)
- Battle of Kinburn (1787) – 1787 – Russo-Turkish War (1787–1792)
- Siege of Ochakov (1788) – 1788 – Russo-Turkish War (1787–1792)
- Naval actions at the siege of Ochakov (1788) – 1788 – Russo-Turkish War (1787–1792)
- Siege of Khotin (1788) – 1788 – Russo-Turkish War (1787–1792)
- Battle of Fidonisi – 1788 – Russo-Turkish War (1787–1792)
- Battle of Kerch Strait (1790) – 1790 – Russo-Turkish War (1787–1792)
- Battle of Tendra – 1790 – Russo-Turkish War (1787–1792)
- Siege of Izmail – 1790 – Russo-Turkish War (1787–1792)
- Battle of Boruszkowce – 1792 – Polish–Russian War of 1792
- Battle of Zieleńce – 1792 – Polish–Russian War of 1792
- Battle of Poryck – 1831 – November Uprising
- Battle of Alma – 1854
- Battle of Balaclava – 1854
- Battle of Inkerman – 1854
- Battle of Malakoff – 1855
- Brusilov Offensive – 1916
- Battle of Zborov – 1917
- List of battles involving the Ukrainian People's Republic (1917–1921)
- Battle of Bakhmach – 1918
- Battle of Borodozianka – 1920
- Battle of Kiev (1941) – 1941
- Siege of Odessa – 1941
- First Battle of Kharkov – 1941
- Battle of Sevastopol – 1941–1942
- Second Battle of Kharkov – 1942
- Third Battle of Kharkov – 1943 – Last major Axis victory in east front
- Fourth Battle of Kharkov – 1943 – Red army recover Kharkov definitely
- Battle of Kyiv (2022) – 2022 – 2022 Russian invasion of Ukraine
- Battle of Kharkiv – 2022 – 2022 Russian invasion of Ukraine

== United Arab Emirates ==
- Battle of Dibba – c. between 632 and 634 – Ridda Wars
- Battle of the Strait of Hormuz (1553) – 1553 – Ottoman campaign against Hormuz (Ottoman–Portuguese conflicts (1538–1559)) [Ottoman–Portuguese confrontations]
- Battle of the Gulf of Oman – 1554 – Ottoman campaign against Hormuz (Ottoman–Portuguese conflicts (1538–1559)) [Ottoman–Portuguese confrontations]
- Battle off Hormuz (1625) – 1625 – Dutch–Portuguese War

== United Kingdom ==
- For Anglo-Saxon settlement of Britain, see Anglo-Saxon invasions and the founding of England
- For Viking invasions of England, see Viking invasions of England
- Battle of Bedcanford - 571 - Anglo-Saxon settlement of Britain
- Battle of the River Idle - 616 - Anglo-Saxon settlement of Britain
- Battle of Fid Eoin - 629 - Irish clan battles
- Battle of Moira - 637 - Irish clan battles
- Battle of Bulcamp - 654 - Anglo-Saxon settlement of Britain
- Battle of Dun Nechtain - 685 - Pictish-Northumbrian conflicts
- Battle of Ellendun - 825 - Anglo-Saxon settlement of Britain
- Battle of Athelstaneford - 832 - Pictish-Northumbrian confilcts
- Siege of Nottingham (868) - 868 - Viking invasions of England
- Battle of the Conwy - 881
- Siege of London - 886 - Viking invasions of England
- Battle of the Holme - 902 - Æthelwold's Revolt
- Battle of Bauds - 962 - Viking invasions of Scotland
- Battle of Maldon - 991 - Viking invasions of England
- Battle of Assandun - 1016 Cnut's invasion of England
- Battle of Carham - 1018
- Battle of Dunsinane - 1054
- Battle of Lumphanan - 1057
- Battle of Hastings - 1066 - Norman Conquest
- Battle of Northam - 1069 - Norman Conquest
- Battle of Alnwick (1093) - 1093
- Battle of Brecon - 1093 - Norman Conquest
- Battle of Crug Mawr - 1136 - Norman invasion of Wales
- Battle of Clitheroe - 1138 - The Anarchy
- Battle of the Standard - 1138 - The Anarchy
- Battle of Wilton - 1143 - The Anarchy
- Battle of Ewloe - 1157
- Battle of Fornham - 1173 - Revolt against Henry II
- Battle of Alnwick (1174) - 1174 - Revolt against Henry II
- Siege of Nottingham (1194) - 1194
- Battle of Aberconwy - 1194
- Battle of Lincoln (1217) - 1217 - First Barons' War
- Battle of Sandwich (1217) - 1217 - First Barons' War
- Battle of Bryn Derwin - 1255 - Struggle for Gwynedd
- Battle of Cadfan - 1257
- Battle of Largs - 1263 - Scottish–Norwegian War
- Battle of Northampton (1264) - 1264 - Second Barons' War
- Battle of Lewes - 1264 - Second Barons' War
- Battle of Evesham - 1265 - Second Barons' War
- Battle of Chesterfield - 1266 - Second Barons' War
- Siege of Kenilworth - 1266 - Second Barons' War
- Battle of Ronaldsway – 1275 – Manx revolt of 1275
- Battle of Llandeilo Fawr - 1282 - Welsh Rebellion of 1282
- Battle of Moel-y-don - 1282 - Welsh Rebellion of 1282
- Battle of Orewin Bridge - 1282 - Welsh Rebellion of 1282
- Battle of Maes Moydog - 1295 - Welsh revolt of 1294–95
- Sack of Berwick (1296) - 1296 - First War of Scottish Independence
- Battle of Dunbar (1296) - 1296 - First War of Scottish Independence
- Battle of Stirling Bridge - 1297 - First War of Scottish Independence
- Battle of Falkirk - 1298 - First War of Scottish Independence
- First Siege of Stirling Castle - 1299 - First War of Scottish Independence
- Battle of Roslin - 1303 - First War of Scottish Independence
- Battle of Happrew - 1304 - First War of Scottish Independence
- Siege of Stirling Castle (1304) - 1304 - First War of Scottish Independence
- Battle of Methven - 1306 - First War of Scottish Independence
- Battle of Dalrigh - 1306 - First War of Scottish Independence
- Battle of Loch Ryan - 1307 - First War of Scottish Independence
- Battle of Glen Trool - 1307 - First War of Scottish Independence
- Battle of Loudoun Hill - 1307 - First War of Scottish Independence
- Battle of Inverurie (1308) - 1308 - First War of Scottish Independence
- Battle of the Pass of Brander - 1308 - First War of Scottish Independence
- First siege of Gibraltar – 1309 – Reconquista
- Battle of Bannockburn - 1314 - First War of Scottish Independence
- Siege of Carlisle (1315) - 1315 - First War of Scottish Independence
- Battle of Moiry Pass - 1315 - First War of Scottish Independence
- Battle of Skaithmuir - 1316 - First War of Scottish Independence
- Second siege of Gibraltar – 1316 – 1317 – Reconquista
- Battle of Burton Bridge (1322) - 1322 - Despenser War
- Battle of Boroughbridge - 1322 - Despenser War
- Siege of Bristol (1326) - 1326 - Invasion of England
- Battle of Kinghorn - 1332 - Second War of Scottish Independence
- Battle of Dupplin Moor - 1332 - Second War of Scottish Independence
- Battle of Annan - 1332 - Second War of Scottish Independence
- Third siege of Gibraltar – 1333 – Reconquista
- Fourth siege of Gibraltar – 1333 – Reconquista
- Battle of Halidon Hill - 1333 - Second War of Scottish Independence
- Battle of Boroughmuir - 1335 - Second War of Scottish Independence
- Battle of Lough Neagh - 1345
- Battle of Neville's Cross - 1346 - Second War of Scottish Independence
- Fifth siege of Gibraltar – 1349 – 1350 – Reconquista
- Battle of Winchelsea - 1350 - Hundred Years' War
- Battle of North Walsham - 1381 - Peasants' Revolt
- Battle of Margate - 1387 - Hundred Years' War
- Battle of Radcot Bridge - 1387
- Battle of Otterburn - 1388 - Anglo-Scottish Wars
- Battle of the North Inch - 1396 - Scottish clan wars
- Battle of Mynydd Hyddgen - 1401 - Glyndŵr rebellion
- Battle of Tuthill - 1401 - Glyndŵr rebellion
- Battle of Bryn Glas - 1402 - Glyndŵr rebellion
- Battle of Nesbit Moor (1402) - 1402 - Anglo-Scottish Wars
- Battle of Homildon Hill - 1402 - Anglo-Scottish Wars
- Battle of Shrewsbury - 1403 - Glyndŵr Rising
- Battle of Pwll Melyn - 1405 - Glyndŵr Rising
- Battle of Tuiteam Tarbhach - 1406 - Scottish clan wars
- Battle of Bramham Moor - 1408 - Percy Rebellion
- Sixth siege of Gibraltar – 1411 – Reconquista
- Battle of Harlaw - 1411 - Scottish clan wars
- Battle of Inverlochy (1431) - 1431 - Scottish clan wars
- Battle of Piperdean - 1435 - Anglo-Scottish Wars
- Seventh siege of Gibraltar – 1436 – Reconquista
- Battle of Sark - 1448 - Anglo-Scottish Wars
- First Battle of St Albans - 1455 - Wars of the Roses
- Battle of Arkinholm - 1455 - Scottish clan wars
- Battle of Blore Heath - 1459 - Wars of the Roses
- Battle of Ludford Bridge - 1459 - Wars of the Roses
- Battle of Sandwich (1460) - 1460 - Wars of the Roses
- Battle of Northampton (1460) - 1460 - Wars of the Roses
- Battle of Wakefield - 1460 - Wars of the Roses
- Battle of Mortimer's Cross - 1461 - Wars of the Roses
- Second Battle of St Albans - 1461 - Wars of the Roses
- Battle of Ferrybridge - 1461 - Wars of the Roses
- Battle of Towton - 1461 - Wars of the Roses
- Eighth siege of Gibraltar – 1462 – Reconquista
- Battle of Hedgeley Moor - 1464 - Wars of the Roses
- Battle of Hexham - 1464 - Wars of the Roses
- Ninth siege of Gibraltar – 1466 – 1467 – Reconquista
- Battle of Edgcote - 1469 - Wars of the Roses
- Battle of Losecoat Field - 1470 - Wars of the Roses
- Battle of Ravenspur - 1471 - Wars of the Roses
- Battle of Barnet - 1471 - Wars of the Roses
- Battle of Tewkesbury - 1471 Wars of the Roses
- Battle of Skibo and Strathfleet - 1480 - Scottish clan wars
- Battle of Bloody Bay - 1480 - Scottish clan wars
- Battle of Lagabraad - 1480 - Scottish clan wars
- Battle of Lochmaben Fair - 1484 - Scottish clan wars
- Battle of Bosworth Field - 1485 - Wars of the Roses
- Battle of Stoke Field - 1487 - Wars of the Roses
- Battle of Aldy Charrish - 1487 - Scottish clan wars
- Battle of Sauchieburn - 1488 - Scottish clan wars
- Battle of Drumchatt (1497) - 1497 - Rebellion of Domhnall Dubh
- Battle of Flodden - 1513 - War of the League of Cambrai
- Battle of Haddon Rig - 1542 - Anglo-Scottish Wars
- Battle of Alltan-Beath - 1542 - Scottish clan wars
- Battle of the Shirts - 1542 - Scottish clan wars
- Battle of Solway Moss - 1542 - Anglo-Scottish Wars
- Battle of Ancrum Moor - 1545 - Rough Wooing
- Battle of the Solent - 1545 - Italian War of 1542–1546
- Battle of Bonchurch - 1545 - Italian War of 1542–1546
- Battle of Pinkie - 1547 - Rough Wooing
- Battle of Dussindale - 1549 - Kett's Rebellion
- Battle of Garbharry - 1555 - Scottish clan wars
- Battle of Glasgow (1560) - 1560 - The Reformation
- Battle of Corrichie - 1562 - Marian civil war
- Battle of Glentaisie - 1565 - Irish Clan Wars
- Battle of Carberry Hill - 1567 - Marian civil war
- Battle of Langside - 1568 - Marian civil war
- Battle of Tillieangus - 1571 - Marian civil war
- Battle of Craibstone - 1571 - Marian civil war
- Battle of Bun Garbhain - 1580 - Scottish clan wars
- Action off Bermuda (1585) – 1585 – Anglo-Spanish War (1585–1604)
- Battle of Dryfe Sands - 1593 - Scottish clan wars
- Battle of Glenlivet - 1594 - Scottish clan wars
- Battle of the Yellow Ford - 1598 - Nine Years' War
- Battle of Carinish - 1601 - Scottish clan wars
- Battle of Coire Na Creiche - 1601 - Scottish clan wars
- Battle of Morar - 1602 - Scottish clan wars
- Battle of the Narrow Seas - 1602 - Eighty Years' War
- Battle of Glen Fruin - 1603 - Scottish clan wars
- Battle of Gibraltar (1607) – 1607 – Eighty Years' War, 1599–1609 (Eighty Years' War) [European wars of religion]
- Battle of Gibraltar (1618) – 1618 – Eighty Years' War (European wars of religion)
- Battle of Gibraltar (1621) – 1621 – Eighty Years' War, 1621–1648 (Eighty Years' War and Thirty Years' War) [European wars of religion]
- Battle off Lizard Point - 1637 - Eighty Years' War
- Battle of the Downs - 1639 - Eighty Years' War
- Battle of Newburn - 1640 - Second Bishops' War
- Battle of Babylon Hill - 1642 - First English Civil War
- Battle of Powick Bridge - 1642 - First English Civil War
- Battle of Kings Norton - 1642 - First English Civil War
- Battle of Edgehill - 1642 - First English Civil War
- Battle of Aylesbury - 1642 - First English Civil War
- Battle of Brentford (1642) - 1642 - First English Civil War
- Battle of Turnham Green - 1642 - First English Civil War
- Battle of Tadcaster - 1642 - First English Civil War
- Battle of Braddock Down - 1643 - First English Civil War
- Battle of Leeds - 1643 - First English Civil War
- First Battle of Middlewich - 1643 - First English Civil War
- Battle of Hopton Heath - 1643 - First English Civil War
- Battle of Seacroft Moor - 1643 - First English Civil War
- Battle of Camp Hill - 1643 - First English Civil War
- Battle of Ripple Field - 1643 - First English Civil War
- Battle of Sourton Down - 1643 - First English Civil War
- Battle of Stratton - 1643 - First English Civil War
- Battle of Chalgrove Field - 1643 - First English Civil War
- Battle of Adwalton Moor - 1643 - First English Civil War
- Battle of Burton Bridge (1643) - 1643 - First English Civil War
- Battle of Lansdowne - 1643 - First English Civil War
- Battle of Roundway Down - 1643 - First English Civil War
- Battle of Gainsborough - 1643 - First English Civil War
- Battle of Aldbourne Chase - 1643 - First English Civil War
- First Battle of Newbury - 1643 - First English Civil War
- Battle of Winceby - 1643 - First English Civil War
- Battle of Alton - 1643 - First English Civil War
- Battle of Nantwich - 1644 - First English Civil War
- Battle of Boldon Hill - 1644 - First English Civil War
- Battle of Cheriton - 1644 - First English Civil War
- Battle of Selby - 1644 - First English Civil War
- Battle of Tipton Green - 1644 - First English Civil War
- Battle of Oswestry - 1644 - First English Civil War
- Battle of Cropredy Bridge - 1644 - First English Civil War
- Battle of Marston Moor - 1644 - First English Civil War
- Battle of Lostwithiel - 1644 - Wars of the Three Kingdoms
- Battle of Tippermuir - 1644 - Wars of the Three Kingdoms
- Battle of Aberdeen (1644) - 1644 - Wars of the Three Kingdoms
- Second Battle of Newbury - 1644 - First English Civil War
- Battle of Inverlochy (1645) - 1645 - Scotland in the Wars of the Three Kingdoms
- Battle of Weymouth - 1645 - First English Civil War
- Battle of Auldearn - 1645 - Scotland in the Wars of the Three Kingdoms
- Battle of Naseby - 1645 - First English Civil War
- Battle of Alford - 1645 - Scotland in the Wars of the Three Kingdoms
- Battle of Kilsyth - 1645 - Scotland in the Wars of the Three Kingdoms
- Battle of Philiphaugh - 1645 - Scotland in the Wars of the Three Kingdoms
- Battle of Bovey Heath - 1646 - First English Civil War
- Battle of Torrington - 1646 - First English Civil War
- Battle of Stow-on-the-Wold - 1646 - First English Civil War
- Battle of Benburb - 1646 - Irish Confederate Wars
- Battle of Rhunahaorine Moss - 1647 - Scotland in the Wars of the Three Kingdoms
- Battle of St Fagans - 1648 - Second English Civil War
- Siege of Pembroke - 1648 - Second English Civil War
- Battle of Maidstone - 1648 - Second English Civil War
- Battle of Preston (1648) - 1648 - Second English Civil War
- Battle of Carbisdale - 1650 - Scotland in the Wars of the Three Kingdoms
- Battle of Dunbar (1650) - 1650 - Third English Civil War
- Battle of Hieton - 1650 - Third English Civil War
- Battle of Worcester - 1651 - Third English Civil War
- Capture of Elizabeth Castle - 1651 - Wars of the Three Kingdoms
- Battle of Plymouth (1652) - 1652 - First Anglo-Dutch War
- Battle of the Kentish Knock - 1652 - First Anglo-Dutch War
- Battle of Dungeness - 1652 - First Anglo-Dutch War
- Battle of Portland - 1653 - First Anglo-Dutch War
- Battle of the Gabbard - 1653 - First Anglo-Dutch War
- Battle of Lowestoft - 1665 - Second Anglo-Dutch War
- Four Days' Battle - 1666 - Second Anglo-Dutch War
- St. James' Day Battle - 1666 - Second Anglo-Dutch War
- Raid on the Medway - 1667 - Second Anglo-Dutch War
- Action of 12 March 1672 - 1672 - Franco-Dutch War
- Battle of Solebay - 1672 - Third Anglo-Dutch War
- Dutch invasion of Saint Helena – 1673 – Third Anglo-Dutch War (Franco-Dutch War and Anglo-Dutch Wars)
- Battle of Ronas Voe - 1674 - Third Anglo-Dutch War
- Battle of Drumclog - 1679 - Scottish Covenanter Wars
- Battle of Bothwell Bridge - 1679 - Scottish Covenanter Wars
- Battle of Sedgemoor - 1685 - Monmouth Rebellion
- Battle of Reading (1688) - 1688 - Glorious Revolution
- Break of Dromore - 1689 - Williamite War
- Siege of Derry - 1689 - Williamite War
- Battle of Killiecrankie - 1689 - Jacobite rising of 1689
- Battle of Newtownbutler - 1689 - Williamite War
- Siege of Carrickfergus - 1689 - Williamite War
- Battle of Dunkeld - 1689 - Jacobite rising of 1689
- Raid on Newry - 1689 - Williamite War
- Battle of Cromdale - 1690 - Jacobite rising of 1689
- Battle of Beachy Head (1690) - 1690 - Nine Years' War
- Capture of Gibraltar – 1704 – War of the Spanish Succession
- Twelfth siege of Gibraltar – 1704 – 1705 – War of the Spanish Succession
- Action of 2 May 1707 - 1707 - War of the Spanish Succession
- Battle at the Lizard - 1707 - War of the Spanish Succession
- Skirmish of Dunfermline - 1715 - Jacobite rising of 1715
- Skirmish of Alness - 1715 - Jacobite rising of 1715
- Battle of Preston (1715) - 1715 - Jacobite rising of 1715
- Battle of Sheriffmuir - 1715 - Jacobite rising of 1715
- Capture of Eilean Donan Castle - 1719 - Jacobite rising of 1719
- Battle of Glen Shiel - 1719 - Jacobite rising of 1719
- Battle of Glen Affric - 1721 - Jacobite rising of 1719
- Battle of Coille Bhan - 1721 - Jacobite rising of 1719
- Thirteenth siege of Gibraltar – 1727 – Anglo-Spanish War (1727–1729)
- Battle of Anguilla - 1745 - War of the Austrian Succession
- Highbridge Skirmish - 1745 - Jacobite rising of 1745
- Siege of Ruthven Barracks (1745) - 1745 - Jacobite rising of 1745
- Battle of Prestonpans - 1745 - Jacobite rising of 1745
- Siege of Culloden House (1745) - 1745 - Jacobite rising of 1745
- Siege of Carlisle (November 1745) - 1745 - Jacobite rising of 1745
- Clifton Moor Skirmish - 1745 - Jacobite rising of 1745
- Siege of Carlisle (December 1745) - 1745 - Jacobite rising of 1745
- Battle of Inverurie (1745) - 1745 - Jacobite rising of 1745
- Siege of Fort Augustus (December 1745) - 1745 - Jacobite rising of 1745
- Battle of Falkirk Muir - 1746 - Jacobite rising of 1745
- Siege of Stirling Castle - 1746 - Jacobite rising of 1745
- Siege of Ruthven Barracks (1746) - 1746 - Jacobite rising of 1745
- Siege of Inverness (1746) - 1746 - Jacobite rising of 1745
- Siege of Fort Augustus (1746) - 1746 - Jacobite rising of 1745
- Atholl raids - 1746 - Jacobite rising of 1745
- Siege of Blair Castle - 1746 - Jacobite rising of 1745
- Skirmish of Keith - 1746 - Jacobite rising of 1745
- Battle of Dornoch - 1746 - Jacobite rising of 1745
- Siege of Fort William - 1746 - Jacobite rising of 1745
- Skirmish of Tongue - 1746 - Jacobite rising of 1745
- Battle of Littleferry - 1746 - Jacobite rising of 1745
- Battle of Culloden - 1746 - Jacobite rising of 1745
- Skirmish of Loch nan Uamh - 1746 - Jacobite rising of 1745
- Skirmish of Loch Ailort - 1746 - Jacobite rising of 1745
- Skirmish of Arisaig - 1746 - Jacobite rising of 1745
- Raids on Lochaber and Shiramore - 1746 - Jacobite rising of 1745
- Battle of Carrickfergus (1760) - 1760 - Seven Years' War
- Battle of Bishops Court – 1760 – Planned French invasion of Britain (1759) (Seven Years' War)
- Capture of Port Egmont - 1770
- North Channel Naval Duel – 1778 – American Revolutionary War
- Invasion of Jersey (1779) – 1779 – American Revolutionary War
- Great Siege of Gibraltar – 1779 – 1783 – American Revolutionary War
- Battle of Flamborough Head - 1779 - American Revolutionary War
- Action of 30 September 1780 – 1780 – American Revolutionary War
- Battle of Jersey – 1781 – American Revolutionary War
- Action of 4 February 1781 – 1781 – Fourth Anglo-Dutch War (American Revolutionary War)
- Battle of Dogger Bank (1781) – 1781 – Fourth Anglo-Dutch War (American Revolutionary War)
- Capture of Montserrat – 1782 – American Revolutionary War
- Battle of Grand Turk – 1783 – American Revolutionary War
- Action of 18 June 1793 - 1793 - War of the First Coalition
- Action of 23 April 1794 - 1794 - War of the First Coalition
- Battle of the Diamond - 1795 - Armagh disturbances
- Battle of Fishguard - 1797 - War of the First Coalition
- Battle of Antrim - 1798 - Irish Rebellion of 1798
- Action of 19 January 1799 - 1799 - French Revolutionary Wars
- Action of 7 July 1799 - 1799 - Napoleonic Wars
- Action of 10 December 1800 - 1800 - Napoleonic Wars
- Battle of Britain - 1940 - World War II
- Battle of the Bogside - 1969 - The Troubles
- Battle of St Matthew's - 1970 - The Troubles
- Battle at Springmartin - 1972 - The Troubles
- 1978 British Army Gazelle downing - 1978 - The Troubles
- Warrenpoint ambush - 1979 - The Troubles
- Battle of San Carlos (1982) - 1982 - Falklands War
- Battle of Seal Cove - 1982 - Falklands War
- Battle of Goose Green - 1982 - Falklands War
- Battle of Mount Harriet - 1982 - Falklands War
- Battle of Two Sisters - 1982 - Falklands War
- Battle of Mount Longdon - 1982 - Falklands War
- Battle of Wireless Ridge - 1982 - Falklands War
- Battle of Mount Tumbledown - 1982 - Falklands War
- Battle of Newry Road - 1993 - The Troubles

== United States ==
For American Revolutionary War, see List of American Revolutionary War battles

- Battle at Etzanoa - 1601 - Spanish colonization of the Americas
- Iroquois War (1609) - 1609 - Beaver Wars
- Battle of Oneida - 1615
- Battle of Bloody Run (1656) - 1656
- New York Slave Revolt of 1712 - 1712 - Slave Revolts in North America
- Siege of Charlestown - 1718 - Golden Age of Piracy
- Battle of Cape Fear River - 1718 - Golden Age of Piracy
- Capture of Pensacola (1719) - 1719 - War of the Quadruple Alliance
- Villasur expedition - 1720 - War of the Quadruple Alliance
- Capture of the sloop Ranger - 1723 - Golden Age of Piracy
- Samba rebellion - 1731 - Slave Revolts in North America
- 1733 slave insurrection on St. John - 1733 - Slave Revolts in North America
- Stono Rebellion - 1739 - Slave Revolts in North America
- Battle of Galudoghson - 1742
- Battle of Kathio - 1750
- Siege of Fort Detroit - 1763 - Pontiac's War
- Siege of Fort Pitt - 1763 - Pontiac's War
- Battle of Bloody Run - 1763 - Pontiac's War
- Battle of Bushy Run - 1763 - Pontiac's War
- Battle of Devil's Hole - 1763 - Pontiac's War
- Louisiana Rebellion of 1768 - 1768
- Battle of Point Pleasant - 1774 - Lord Dunmore's War
- First Battle of Terrenate - 1776 - Apache–Mexico Wars
- Battle of Kealakekua Bay - 1779
- First Battle of Tucson - 1779 - Apache–Mexico Wars
- Second Battle of Tucson - 1782 - Apache–Mexico Wars
- Battle of Mokuʻōhai - 1782 - Unification of Hawai'i
- Fourth Battle of Tucson - 1783 - Apache–Mexico Wars
- Battle of the Catalina River - 1783 - Apache–Mexico Wars
- Skirmishes around Vincennes (1786) - 1786 - Northwest Indian War
- Shays's Rebellion - 1786
- Logan's raid - 1786 - Northwest Indian War
- Battle of the Pinal Mountains - 1788 - Apache–Mexico Wars
- Harmar campaign - 1790 - Northwest Indian War
- 1790 Footprints - 1790 - Unification of Hawai'i
- Battle of Kepaniwai - 1790 - Unification of Hawai'i
- Battle of Kenapacomaqua - 1791 - Northwest Indian War
- Battle of Kawaihae - 1791 - Unification of Hawai'i
- St. Clair's defeat - 1791 - Northwest Indian War
- Action of 31 July 1793 - 1793 - War of the First Coalition
- Battle of Fallen Timbers - 1794 - Northwest Indian War
- Nickajack Expedition - 1794
- Battle of Nuʻuanu - 1795 - Unification of Hawai'i
- Capture of La Croyable - 1798 - Quasi-War

== Wales ==
Date	Name of the battle	Part of	1st combattant	2nd combattant	Result
50	Caratacus' last battle	Roman conquest of Britain	Roman Empire	Celtic Britons	Roman victory
60 or 61	Roman conquest of Anglesey	Roman conquest of Britain	Roman Empire	Celtic Britons	Roman retreat due to the Boudican revolt
77	Roman conquest of Anglesey	Roman conquest of Britain	Roman Empire	Celtic Britons	Roman victory
c. 630	Battle of Cefn Digoll	Anglo-Saxon settlement of Britain	Kingdom of Gwynedd and Mercia	Northumbria	Gwynedd-Mercian victory; Northumbrian domination of Gwynedd ended
893	Battle of Buttington	Danelaw (Viking activity in the British Isles)	Mercia, Wessex and Welsh people	Vikings	Anglo-Welsh victory
1081	Battle of Mynydd Carn	Welsh dynastic struggle	Gruffudd ap Cynan and Rhys ap Tewdwr	Trahaearn ap Caradog and Caradog ap Gruffydd	Victory for Gruffud and Rhys
January 1136	Battle of Llwchwr	Norman invasion of Wales	Welsh people	Normans	Welsh victory
10 October 1136	Battle of Crug Mawr	Norman invasion of Wales	Kingdom of Gwynedd and Deheubarth	Normans and County of Flanders	Welsh victory
June 1401	Battle of Mynydd Hyddgen	Glyndŵr rebellion	Principality of Wales	Kingdom of England	Welsh victory
2 November 1401	Battle of Tuthill	Glyndŵr rebellion	Principality of Wales	Kingdom of England	English victory
22 June 1402	Battle of Bryn Glas	Glyndŵr rebellion	Principality of Wales	Kingdom of England	Welsh victory
c. 1403	Battle of Stalling Down or Battle of Bryn Owain	Glyndŵr rebellion	Principality of Wales	Kingdom of England	Welsh victory
1405	Battle of Grosmont	Glyndŵr rebellion	Principality of Wales	Kingdom of England	English victory
5 May 1405	Battle of Pwll Melyn or Battle of Usk	Glyndŵr rebellion	Principality of Wales	Kingdom of England	English victory
18 September 1644	Relief of Montgomery Castle	First English Civil War, 1644 (First English Civil War) [Wars of the Three Kingdoms]	Cavalier	Roundhead	Parliamentarian/Roundhead victory
1 November 1645	Battle of Denbigh Green	First English Civil War, 1645 (First English Civil War) [Wars of the Three Kingdoms]	Cavalier	Roundhead	Parliamentarian/Roundhead victory
6 May 1648	Battle of St Fagans	Second English Civil War (Wars of the Three Kingdoms)	Cavalier	Roundhead	Parliamentarian/Roundhead victory
31 May 1648 - 11 July 1648	Siege of Pembroke	Second English Civil War (Wars of the Three Kingdoms)	Cavalier	Roundhead	Parliamentarian/Roundhead victory
5 June 1648	Battle of Y Dalar Hir	Second English Civil War (Wars of the Three Kingdoms)	Cavalier	Roundhead	Parliamentarian/Roundhead victory
22-24 February 1797	Battle of Fishguard	War of the First Coalition (French Revolutionary Wars) [French Revolutionary and Napoleonic Wars]	French First Republic	Kingdom of Great Britain	British victory
