= Anna Dorota Chrzanowska =

Polish heroine of the Polish-Ottoman War

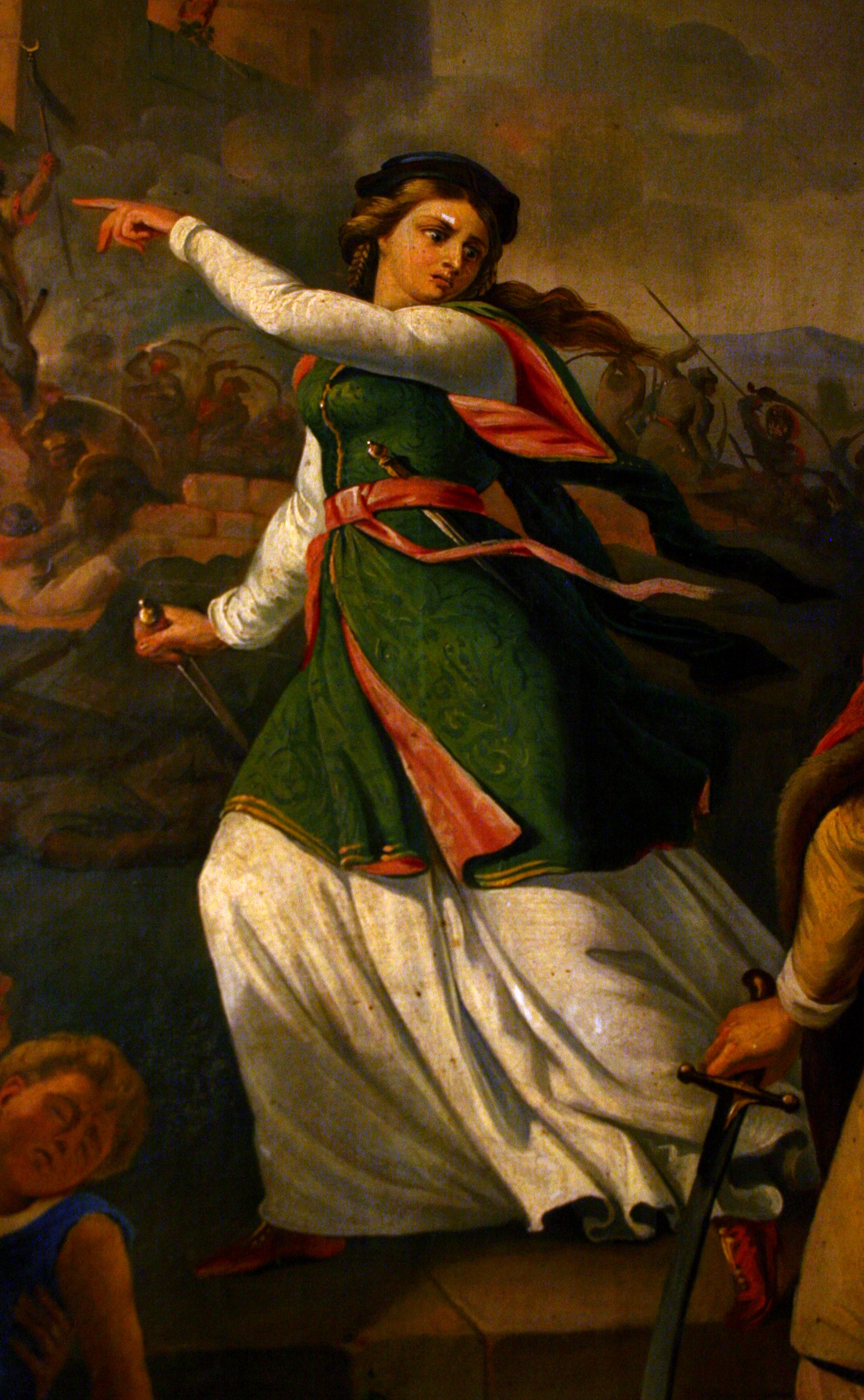
Anna Dorota Chrzanowska

Anna Dorota Chrzanowska (née von Fresen; fl. 1675) was a Polish heroine of the Polish–Ottoman War (1672–76), known for her acts during the Battle of Trembowla in 1675. She also became known as Zofia Chrzanowska in the 19th century.

== Act ==
She was married to Captain Jan Samuel Chrzanowski. In 1675, she was present with her spouse at his command position, Trembowla Castle, when it was besieged by the Ottoman Turks. Despite Turkish efforts, the defenders of castle managed to hold their positions after several attacks. After several days, shortages of food and water became severe, and Captain Chrzanowski decided to surrender. Chrzanowska disagreed with this decision, and threatened to commit suicide if he proceeded. She convinced him to hold the fort - furthermore, Anna Dorota urged the defenders to carry out an attack on Turkish positions, resulting in heavy losses among the Ottomans. Chrzanowska’s determination is regarded to have raised the morale among the Poles, despite the fact that their losses were also heavy. The Turks ended the siege on October 11.

In 1676 Polish Sejm raised the Chrzanowski couple to become members of the szlachta (legally privileged noble class), with the right to use the Poraj coat of arms. They became famous celebrities.

== Monument ==
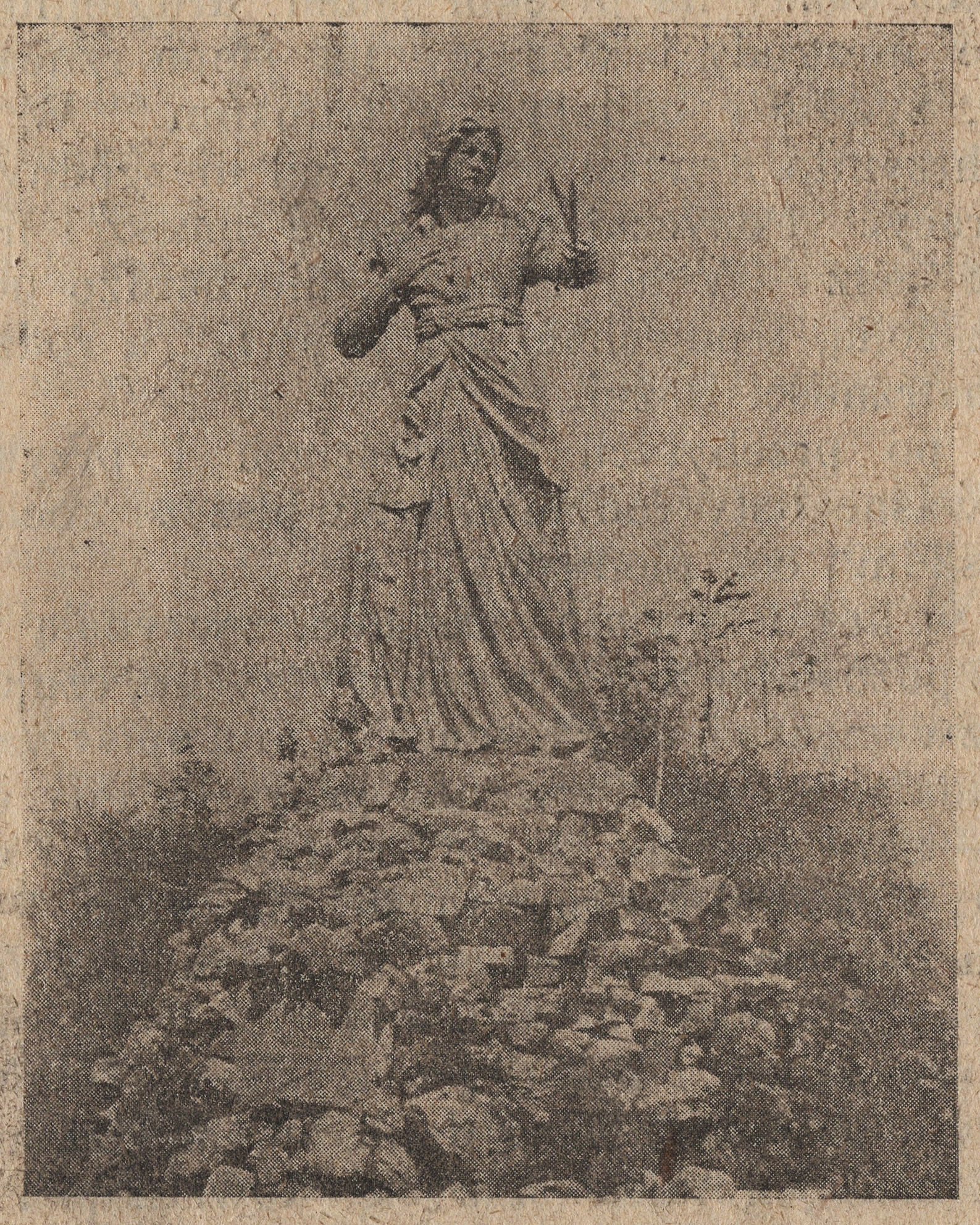
Monument in 1903.

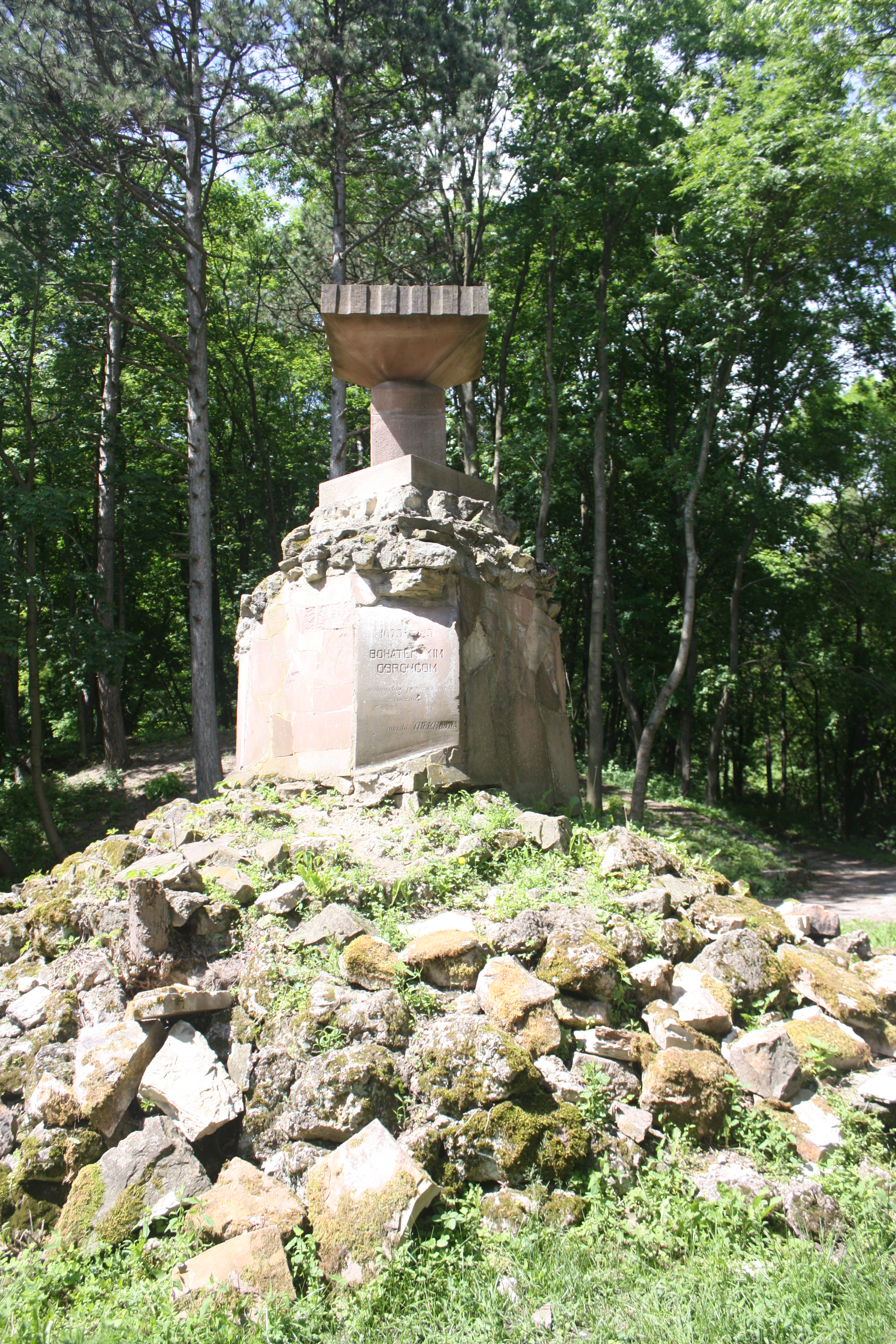
Monument foundation after preservation work in 1982. Picture taken in 2010 before modern monument was erected.

The first monument of Anna Dorota Chrzanowska erected in Trembowla in 1683 was last mentioned in 1829. Subsequently, in 1900, a second one was erected on the same site, work of Terebovlian sculptor Jan Bohenek. It was destroyed in 1944 by Soviet troops.

In 1982, the hill where monument once stood was rebuilt, a slab was built, and a plate that had remained undamaged was reinstalled. In July 2012, the third monument by Roman Vilgushinsky was unveiled.

== Legacy ==
The siege of Trembowla and story of Anna Chrzanowska inspired Polish painters and writers alike. Most notable works:

- Aleksander Lesser (1814–1884) painting Defense of the Trembowla against the Turks
- Leopold Löffler (1827–1898), painting Anna Dorota Chrzanowska at the castle in Trembowla
- Józef Wybicki (1747–1822), drama
- Zofia Kossak-Szczucka (1889–1968), novel Trembowla
- Maria Krüger (1904–1999), story Marcynka's bright braid in the collection Golden Crown
- Andrzej Waligórski (1926–1992), poem Song about the defense of Trembowla which was performed by Tadeusz Chyłę (1933–2014).
