= Jan Samuel Chrzanowski =

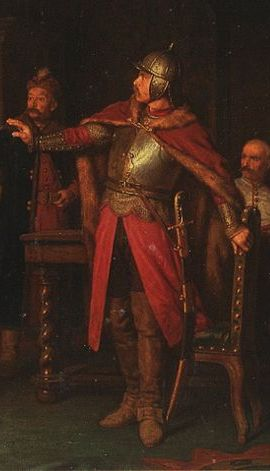
Jan Samuel Chrzanowski, painting by Leopold Löffler, 1867

Jan Samuel Chrzanowski (died 1688 in Jazłowiec (Yazlovets), Polish–Lithuanian Commonwealth, now Chortkiv Raion, Ternopil Oblast, Ukraine) was a Polish officer known for his command during the Battle of Trembowla.

== Life ==
Chrzanowski was a member of the Polish bourgeois. He began his military career in the regiment of Stanisław Koniecpolski. He fought at Khotyn (Chocim) in 1673 and gained the rank of captain the same year. From 1674, he served under Aleksander Niezabitowski . A year later, his regiment came under the ownership of Jan Cetner, the starost of Szczurowice (Ukrainian: Щуровичі).

During the Polish-Turkish war in 1675, a 30,000 strong Turkish army, aided by Tartars and led by the Sultan Serder's son in law Ibrahim Szyszman, invaded present day Ukraine. After conquering Zbaraż (Zbarazh) on July 27, 1675 and Podhorce (Pidhirtsi) on September 11, 1675, about 10,000 soldiers of the Turkish army arrived in Trembowla (Terebovlia). The town was destroyed, but the castle, defended by about 80 soldiers, a handful of nobleman and around 200 peasants, all led by Jan Samuel Chrzanowski, withstood the Turkish armies' advances for over two weeks. On October 11, 1675 the Turkish army withdrew its forces upon hearing that Polish forces led by the King Jan III Sobieski were approaching. In a camp near Buchach King Jan Sobieski gave Chrzanowski the rank of lieutenant colonel.

Chrzanowski's acts of bravery became famous in all of Poland, and in 1676 he was asked to stand before the Polish–Lithuanian Commonwealth's General sejm wherein he became ennobled and granted the Poraj coat of arms, while also receiving a reward of 5,000 złoty.

From 1676 he was a commandant of Lwów (Lviv) and from 1682 a podstoli of Mielnic.

He was married to Anna Dorota Chrzanowska.

== See also ==
- Wojciech Chrzanowski
- Anna Dorota Chrzanowska
