= Battle of Trembowla =

1675 battle

Coordinates: 49°17′57″N 25°41′24″E

- Part of the Polish–Ottoman War (1672–76)
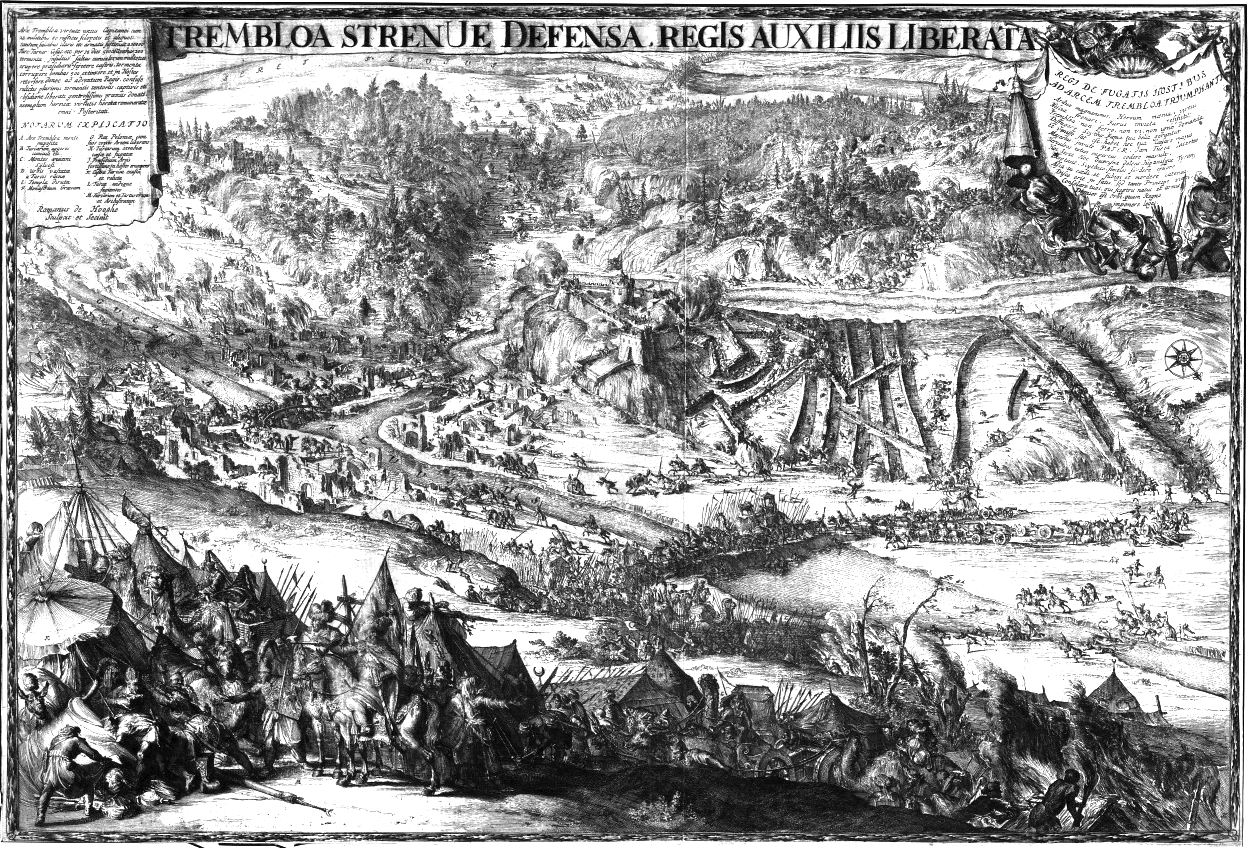
- The Siege of Trembowla, an etching by Romeyn de Hooghe
Date	20 September - 11 October 1675
Location	Trembowla, Polish–Lithuanian Commonwealth
Result	Polish–Lithuanian victory

Belligerents
Ottoman Empire	Polish–Lithuanian Commonwealth

Commanders and leaders
Ibrahim Shishman	Jan Samuel Chrzanowski

Strength
10,000	80 infantry 200 peasants

Casualties and losses
2,000	Heavy

The Battle of Trembowla, more popularly known as the Defence of Trembowla took place between 20 September – 11 October 1675, during the Polish-Ottoman War (1672-1676). Heroic resistance of Polish forces became a symbol, and was glorified and immortalised in the paintings of Franciszek Smuglewicz, Józef Peszka and Aleksander Lesser.

== History ==
The castle in Trembowla was built in the 14th century on a high hill over the valley of the Hniezna river. Despite its small size (100 metres by 40 metres), it was a strong fortress with walls up to 4 metres thick. After the Turks had captured Kamieniec Podolski (see Siege of Kamieniec Podolski), Trembowla was one of the few Podolian strongholds still in Polish hands.

In the summer of 1675, a 30,000 strong Turkish-Tatar army under command of Ibrahim Shyshman entered Red Ruthenia, a province of the Polish–Lithuanian Commonwealth. On 27 July, the invaders captured Zbarazh, on 11 September, Podhajce, and on 20 September, the Turks approached Trembowla. The castle was defended by a small unit of 80 infantry soldiers, some members of the local nobility, supported by 200 poorly armed, untrained peasants and residents of the town, who fled to the castle. Before the siege, a unit of dragoons stationed here, but was ordered to leave Trembowla, due to food shortages. Polish forces were commanded by Captain Jan Samuel Chrzanowski, whose wife, Anna Dorota Chrzanowska (née Anna Dorota von Fresen), became immortalized after the siege.

Despite Ottoman efforts, the defenders of castle managed to hold their positions after several attacks. After several days, however, shortages of food and water became severe, and Captain Chrzanowski decided to surrender. His wife disagreed with this decision, and threatened to commit suicide if her husband proceeded with the planned surrender, thereby stiffening his spine and creating an atmosphere for defending the castle. Furthermore, Anna Dorota urged the defenders to carry out an attack on Ottoman positions, which resulted in heavy losses among the invaders. Chrzanowska's determination raised the morale among the Poles, but their losses were also heavy. In the night of 4/5 October, only 20 soldiers were able to fight. Facing danger from forces of Jan III Sobieski, which concentrated near Lviv, the Turks decided to end the siege on 11 October.

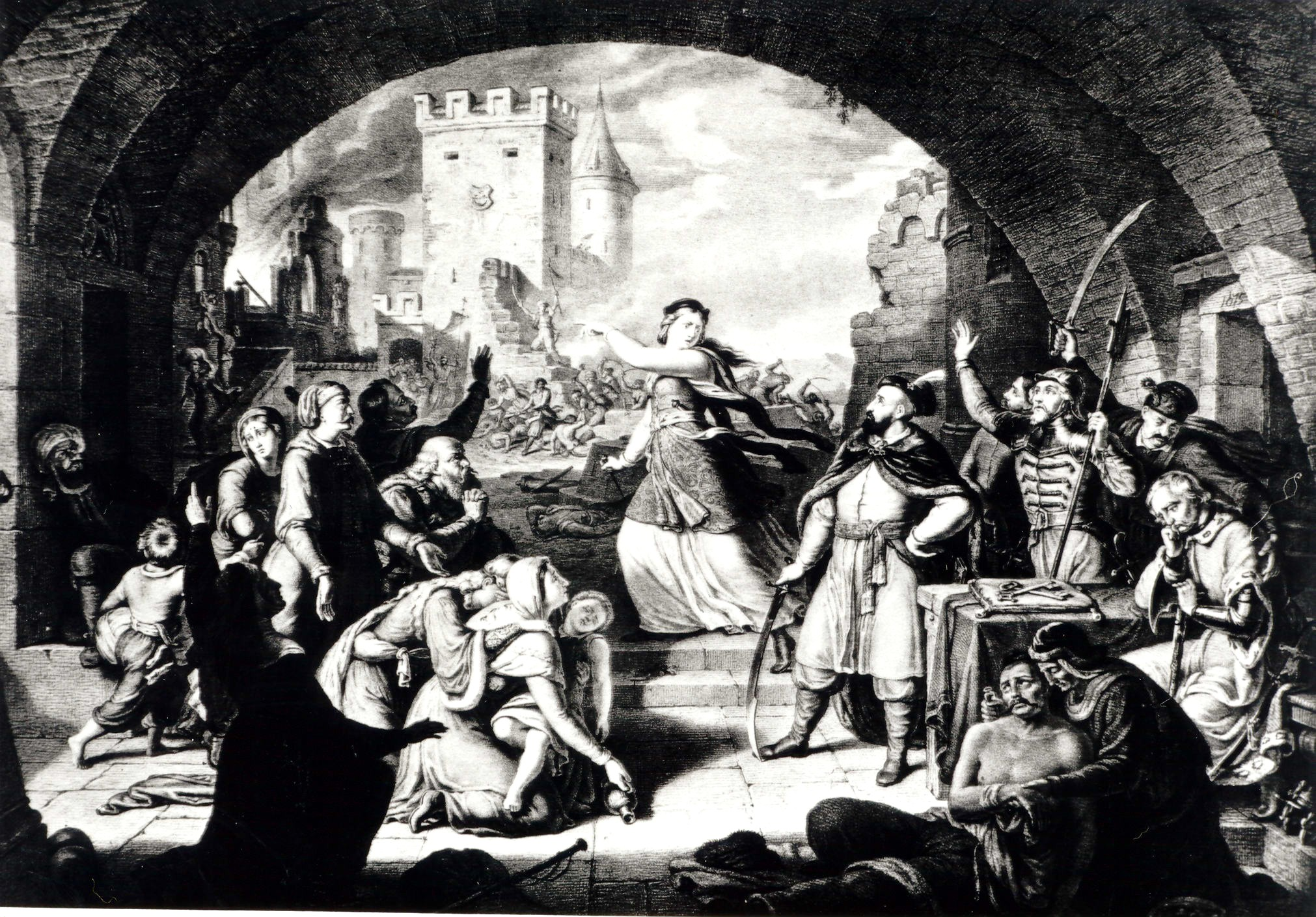
Anna Dorota Chrzanowska encouraging the defenders during the Siege of Trembowla, by Aleksander Lesser

== Aftermath ==
In 1676 Polish Sejm allowed the Chrzanowski couple to become the szlachta, with the right to use the Poraj coat of arms. In 1683 Chrzanowski was named stolnik of Smolensk and Mielnik, and a monument of Anna Dorota Chrzanowska was erected in Trembowla in 1683.

== Siege in culture ==
The siege of Trembowla and story of Anna Chrzanowska inspired Polish painters and writers alike. Most notable works:

- Aleksander Lesser (1814–1884) painting Defense of the Trembowla against the Turks
- Leopold Löffler (1827–1898), painting Anna Dorota Chrzanowska at the castle in Trembowla
- Józef Wybicki (1747–1822), drama
- Zofia Kossak-Szczucka (1889–1968), novel Trembowla
- Maria Krüger (1904–1999), story Marcynka's bright braid in the collection Golden Crown
- Andrzej Waligórski (1926–1992), poem Song about the defense of Trembowla which was performed by Tadeusz Chyła (1933–2014).

== See also ==
- Battle of Lwów (1675)

== Sources ==
- (in Polish) Mala Encyklopedia Wojskowa, Wydawnictwo Ministerstwa Obrony Narodowej, Warszawa 1967, Wydanie I, Tom 2
- (in Polish) Bohaterska obrona Trembowli w 1675 r.
