= Polish–Ottoman War (1672–1676) =

- Part of the Polish–Ottoman Wars and The Ruin
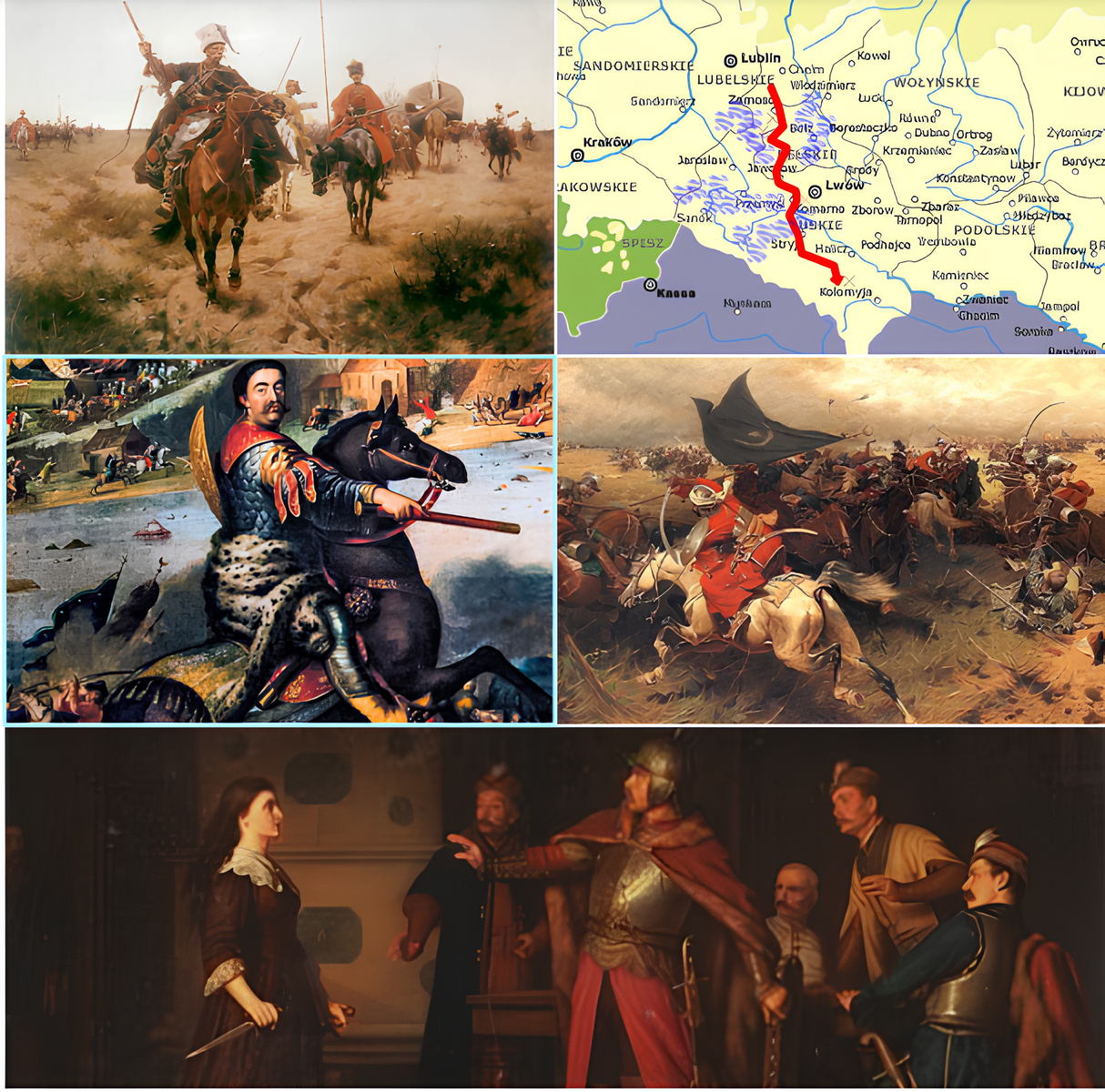
- From top left: Battle of Ładyżyn; John III Sobieski's trip to Tatar forces; John Sobieski in Battle of Khotyn; Battle of Lwów; Anna Dorota Chrzanowska in Trembowla
Date	1672–1676
Location	Polish–Lithuanian Commonwealth
Result	See § Aftermath
Territorial changes	Treaty of Buchach: Ottoman Empire gains Podolia and parts of Central Ukraine; Treaty of Żurawno: Polish-Lithuanian Commonwealth regains Bila Tserkva and Pavoloch

Belligerents
Polish–Lithuanian Commonwealth; Supporters of Khanenko; Wallachia (1673)	Ottoman Empire; Crimean Khanate; Supporters of Doroshenko

Commanders and leaders
John Sobieski; Michał Kazimierz Pac; Mykhailo Khanenko	Mehmed IV; Köprülüzade Fazıl Ahmed; Kara Mustafa Pasha; Selim I Giray; Petro Doroshenko

Strength
12,000 Crown troops and 5,400 Lithuanian troops After 17 October 1672 troops were increased to 31,000 and with the 12,000 Crown and Lithuanian troops including militiamen and private troops the forces available for campaign numbered nearly 60,000	40,000 to 60,000

The Polish–Ottoman War of 1672–1676 was fought by the Polish–Lithuanian Commonwealth and the Ottoman Empire. It ended with the Treaty of Żurawno, by which the Commonwealth ceded control of most of its territories in Central Ukraine to the Ottomans. It was a prelude to the Great Turkish War.

== Prelude ==
The causes of the Polish-Ottoman War of 1672–1676 can be traced to 1666. Petro Doroshenko Hetman of Zaporizhian Host, aiming to gain control of Ukraine but facing defeats from other factions struggling over control of that region, in a final bid to preserve his power in Ukraine, signed a treaty with Sultan Mehmed IV in 1669 that recognized the Cossack Hetmanate as a vassal of the Ottoman Empire.

In the meantime, Commonwealth forces were trying to put down unrest in Ukraine, but were weakened by decades long wars (Khmelnytsky Uprising, The Deluge and Russo-Polish War (1654–1667)). Trying to capitalize on that weakness, Tatars, who commonly raided across the Commonwealth borders in search of loot and plunder, invaded, this time allying themselves with Cossacks under Hetman Doroshenko. They were however stopped by Commonwealth forces under Hetman John Sobieski, who stopped their first push (1666–67), defeating them several times, and finally gaining an armistice after the Battle of Podhajce.

In 1670, however, hetman Doroshenko tried once again to take over Ukraine, and in 1671 Khan of Crimea, Adil Giray, supportive of the Commonwealth, was replaced with a new one, Selim I Giray, by the Ottoman sultan. Selim entered into an alliance with the Doroshenko's Cossacks; but again like in 1666–67 the Cossack-Tatar forces were dealt defeats by Sobieski. Selim then renewed his oath of allegiance to the Ottoman Sultan and pleaded for assistance, to which the Sultan agreed. Thus an irregular border conflict escalated into a regular war in 1671, as the Ottoman Empire was now prepared to send its regular units onto the battlefield in a bid to try to gain control of that region for itself.

== The first phase (1672) ==
Ottoman forces, numbering 80,000 men and led by Grand Vizier Köprülü Fazıl Ahmed and Ottoman sultan Mehmed IV, invaded Polish Ukraine in August, took the Commonwealth fortress at Kamieniec Podolski and besieged Lwów. Unprepared for war, and torn by internal conflict between the king Michael I and the szlachta nobility, the Commonwealth Sejm could not act to raise taxes and gather a larger army. Its representatives were forced to sign the Peace of Buczacz in October that year, which ceded to the Ottomans the Commonwealth part of Ukraine (the Right-bank Bracław Voivodeship, Podole Voivodeship and part of Kiev Voivodeship; Left-bank Ukraine was already controlled by Russia since the Treaty of Andrusovo of 1667) and promised an annual tribute of 22,000 ducats.

== The second phase (1673–1676) ==
Instead of ratifying the peace treaty, the Commonwealth Sejm, with most of the deputies finally united by anger due to the territorial losses and the demeaning tribute (which could in fact be seen as reducing the Commonwealth to Ottomans' vassal) finally raised taxes for a new army (of about 37,000 strong was raised) and increased the Cossack register to 40,000 Hetman John Sobieski led a military campaign against the Ottomans and dealt several defeats to the Ottomans

== Expedition against the Tatar chambuls ==
After capturing Kamieniec Podolski, the Ottoman army began the siege of Lwów on 20 September. At that time, the Tatars, who were not taking part in the siege, aided by Hetman Petro Doroshenko's Cossacks and some Ottoman troops divided into three main groups, ravaged the Polish-Lithuanian Commonwealth. Between the Wieprz and San rivers, the forces of Jiambet Giray were active, while the Nurredin-Sultan's forces were active south of the Dniester. A third group commanded by Haci Giray operated on the Vistula and the middle San as far as Jasło. In total, these groups numbered about 20,000 soldiers and operated in dispersion.

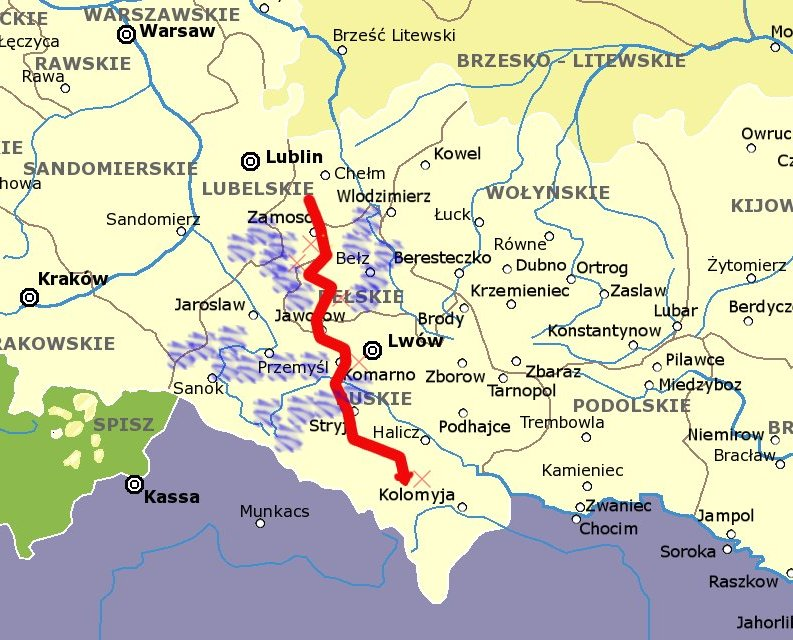
John III Sobieski's trip to Tatar forces

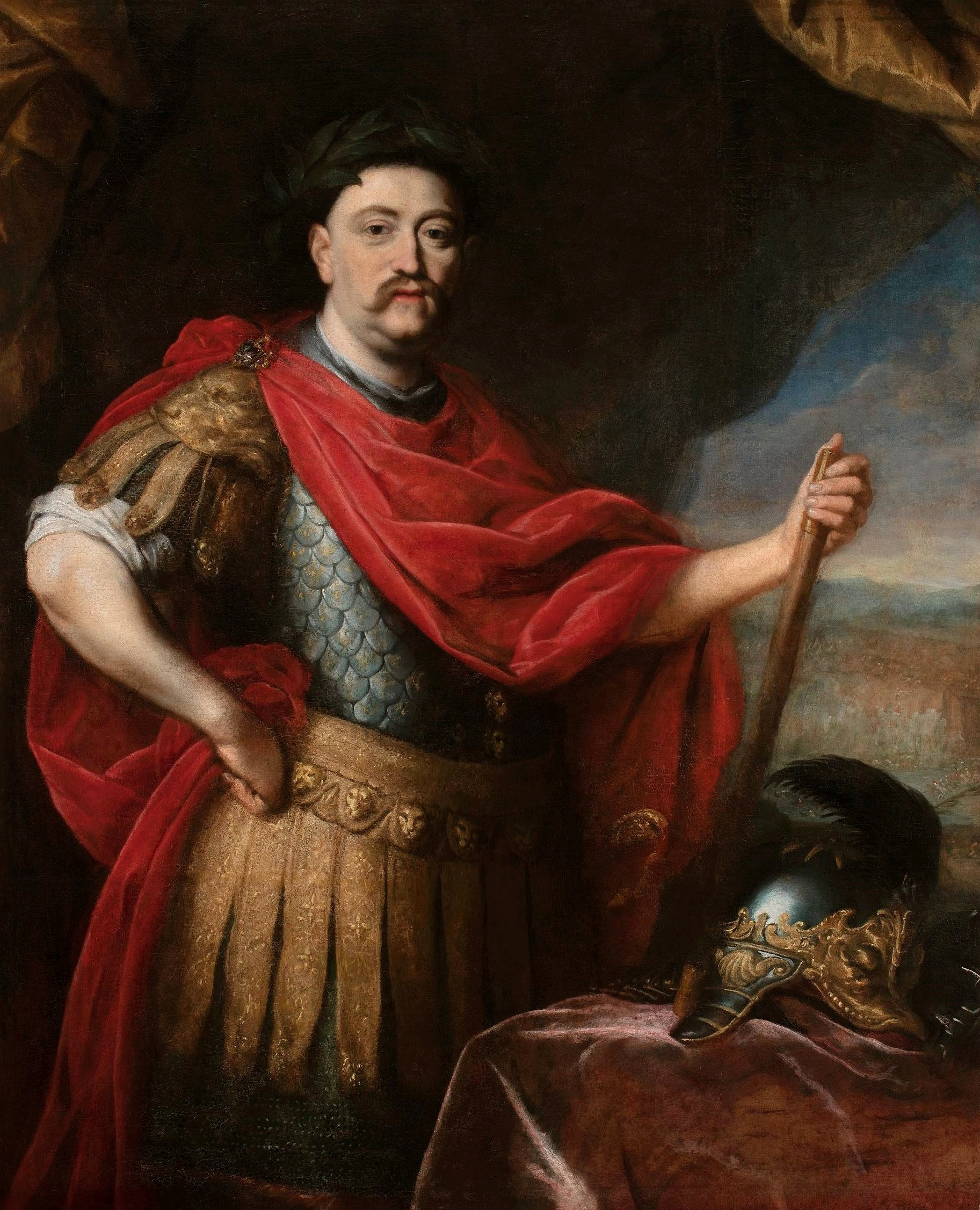
John III Sobieski

=== Expedition ===
Grand Hetman of the Crown John III Sobieski, who had only 2.5-3 thousand cavalry and dragoons, moved on 5 October from Krasnystaw against the Tatars, without wagons and taking two horses per soldier. Going to the rear of the Tatar groups, he advanced toward Zamość and at night smashed a small chambul in the battle of Krasnobród, and on 6 October two chambuls in the battle of Narol. On 7 October, in the battle of Nemirów, he caught up with and smashed Jiambet's forces.

After a one-day rest on 8 October, Sobieski on 9 October caught up with and beat Nurredin-Sultan's main forces in the battle of Komarno, pursuing them to Vyshnia. On 11 October, Sobieski's troops crossed the Dniester and set off in pursuit of the retreating Haci Girey. After a strenuous day and night march, the crown army, in the strength of a thousand soldiers (the rest could not keep up and stayed behind), caught up with the Tatars at dawn on 14 October and smashed them in battles at Petranka and Kalush.

=== Aftermath of the campaign ===
John Sobieski, at the head of the cavalry and dragoons, traveled from Krasnystaw to the south in 9 days about 450 kilometers. Acting with great self-sacrifice, the Polish soldiers freed about 44,000 people from the Tatar yasir. The Great Hetman of the Crown, who was directing the operations, used a very effective method of throwing a group of several hundred horsemen against the Tatars, which distracted them from the main forces coming from the opposite direction. This method always made it possible to smash the Tatars, and prevented them from encircling the army completely. The extraordinary success of the expedition with such a small force was due to the fact that Sobieski was always able to choose the right direction of action, thanks to which the rapidly advancing Polish troops using the Tatar marching technique were able to catch up with and smash individual enemy cavalries.

== Battle of Khotyn (1673) ==
The Polish-Lithuanian army, numbering some 30,000 soldiers, under the command of Grand Crown Hetman John Sobieski, besieged the Khotyn fortress in the first days of November 1673. The fortress had natural defensive qualities, as it was located in a bend of the Dniester River. It was protected from the land side by earth ramparts and numerous defensive fortifications built on the site of a former Polish camp from half a century before. The first attacks on the Turkish positions were carried out by Sobieski on 10 November, however, they were intended only to recognize the battlefield and the deployment of enemy forces. The actual battle was fought the next day, when Sobieski hit the Turks tired of the weather and sleeplessness. The Polish-Lithuanian leader took advantage of the fact that the weather was frosty and the Turks were ill-equipped and unprepared for such weather conditions.

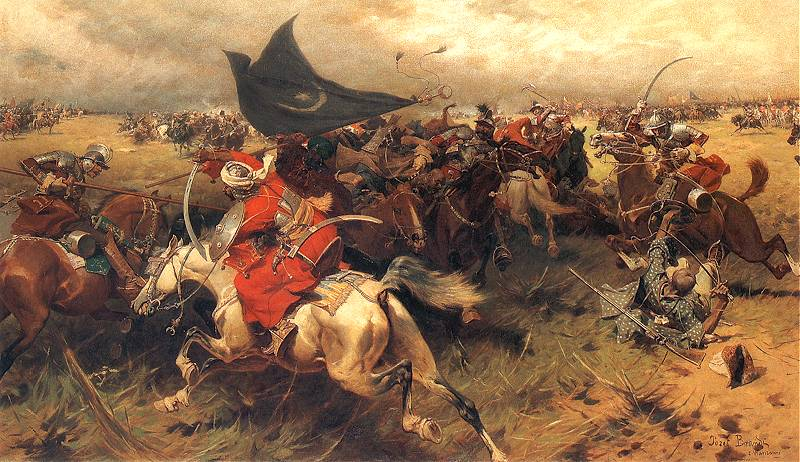
Battle Over the Turkish Banner by Józef Brandt.

After an all-night branding of the attack by the besiegers, in a strong wind and murderous cold for the Turks, at dawn on 11 November Sobieski personally led his troops to storm the Turkish camp. After a cannon salvo, the infantry and dragoons stormed the ramparts, pushing back the enemy and making room for the cavalry. After which, the hussars, led by Hetman Jabłonowski, rushed through the breaches in the ramparts. The Turks responded with a counterattack by the spahis' cavalry, but the spahis could not withstand the bravado of the hussars' charge, and soon the fighting heated up inside the fortress and the Turkish camp, among the dens of tents. In view of the panic that gripped the Turkish troops, Hussein Pasha ordered an evacuation to the other bank of the Dniester. But the only bridge at Chocim was damaged by Polish-Lithuanian artillery fire and collapsed under the weight of those fleeing. Only a few thousand Turks out of the entire 35,000-strong army managed to get through to Kamieniec Podolski.

The rest of the Turkish troops fell or were taken prisoner. The Polish-Lithuanian losses were much smaller, and a strongly fortified fortress with large supplies of food and war supplies was captured.

The Battle of Khotyn ended with a total victory for the Commonwealth, but it did not bring a breakthrough in the war and did not lead to the recovery of Kamieniec Podolski. On the other hand, the prestige of the Commonwealth in Europe increased, especially the respect for Hetman John Sobieski among the Turks, who henceforth called Sobieski the "Lion of Khotyn."

=== Aftermath of the battle ===
In result of the battle the Ottoman army suffered crippling losses. It lost two-thirds of its count in either killed or wounded. On top of that Moldavian and Wallachian troops switched sides and decided to support the Commonwealth. The Turkish forces withdrew from Poland after their supplies and most of their artillery were captured but they retained most of western Ukraine. Sobieski and the nobles returned to Warsaw for elections following the death of Michael Wisniowiecki, King of Poland, the day before the battle.

=== Further campaigns of John III Sobieski ===
After the victory at Khotyn he took control of the Moldavia territory and most of disputed Ukrainian lands. That year King Michael I of Poland died, and in recognition of his victories and dedication, John Sobieski was elected king of the Commonwealth in 1674.

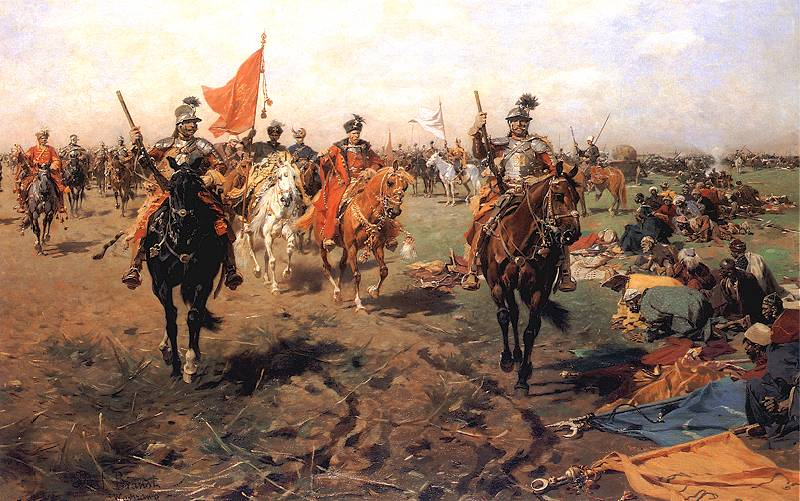
Folding of the standards by Józef Brandt.

Over the next year, however, the Polish forces were subject to attrition, as the Sejm again refused to raise taxes and pay the army, resulting in mass desertions of unpaid soldiery. The Polish problems were further aggravated by the incompetent leadership of Hetman Michał Kazimierz Pac, who obstructed Sobieski's leadership, while the Ottomans continued to receive reinforcements. Nonetheless, in 1674 the Commonwealth resumed the offensive, taking advantage of a new Russo-Turkish conflict that year, and the Polish-Ottoman war remained undecided.

== Battle of Lwów (1675) ==
In the early summer of 1675 the Ottoman forces of Ibrahim Şişman (Abraham the Fat) crossed the Polish border into Podolia and started its rapid march towards Lwów along the banks of the Dniester. The army numbered some 20,000 men and was composed of Ottoman infantry and cavalry with significant Crimean Tatar detachments. The Polish king John III Sobieski decided to concentrate his troops in and around Lwów and face the assaulting Muslim army after more reinforcements arrived. The Ottoman commander was notified of the concentration and moved his army to Lwow.

Sobieski decided to split his forces. A unit of 180 infantrymen, 200 light cavalry and several cannons was placed in the easternmost of the ravines leading to the road to Lwów. Most of the heavy cavalry were placed on the road itself, directly behind the valleys and the plain. The left flank of his forces was guarded by 200 Hussars stationed in the village of Zboiska, while the rest of the light cavalry and infantry guarded all other approaches towards the city in case the Ottomans outflanked the defenders and attacked the city from other directions. The remaining taborites and civilians were ordered to group on the hills surrounding the plains. They were given spare lances of the Hussars in order to give the impression that the number of Polish troops was much higher.

=== Battle ===
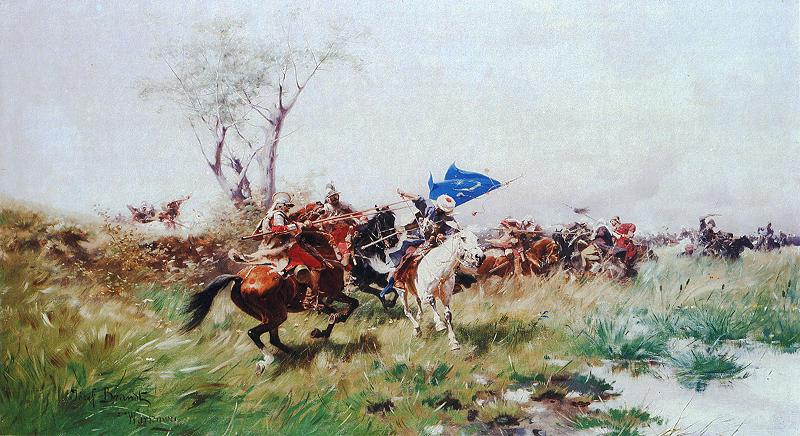
Józef Brandt, Attack of the Cavalry

The Ottomans advance along the route exactly as Sobieski predicted. Convinced that a large group of Hussars were hiding in the woods on the hills, Ibrahim Shyshman ordered a strong group of cavalry to reach the road through one of the ravines. They were stopped by the Polish infantry and then pushed back by a counter-attack of light cavalry. At the same time, Sobieski ordered all troops guarding other approaches towards the city to join the main forces located along the road.

The 1700-strong group of Polish hussars was joined by three banners (300 men) of Lithuanian light cavalry under hetman Michał Kazimierz Radziwiłł. Sobieski ordered the cavalry group to advance through the unguarded western gorge. The ravine was relatively narrow and the Ottomans could not outflank the Polish and Lithuanian cavalry while on the move.

The battle was soon over with Sobieski personally leading. The Pole's pursuit of the Ottoman cavalry lasted until the dusk.

== Battle of Trembowla (1675) ==
The castle in Trembowla was built in the 14th century on a high hill over the valley of the Hniezna river. Despite its small size (100 metres by 40 metres), it was a strong fortress with walls up to 4 metres thick. After the Turks had captured Kamieniec Podolski (see Siege of Kamieniec Podolski), Trembowla was one of the few Podolian strongholds still in Polish hands.

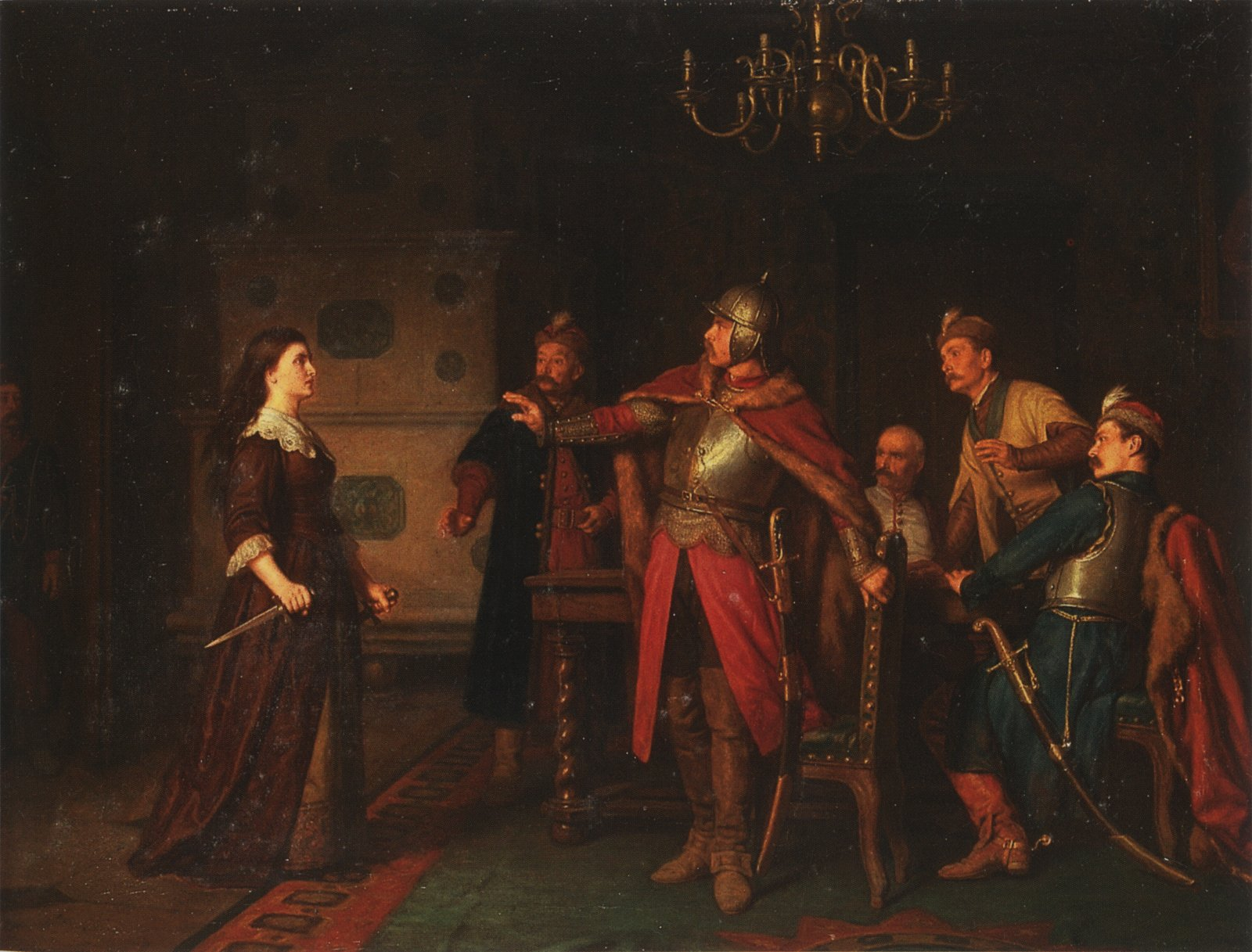
Battle of Trembowla

In the summer of 1675, a 30,000 strong Turkish-Tatar army under command of Ibrahim Shyshman entered Red Ruthenia, a province of the Polish–Lithuanian Commonwealth. On 27 July, the invaders captured Zbaraz, on 11 September, Podhajce, and on 20 September, the Turks approached Trembowla. The castle was defended by a small unit of 80 infantry soldiers, some members of the local nobility, supported by 200 poorly armed, untrained peasants and residents of the town, who fled to the castle. Before the siege, a unit of dragoons stationed here, but was ordered to leave Trembowla, due to food shortages. Polish forces were commanded by Captain Jan Samuel Chrzanowski, whose wife, Anna Dorota Chrzanowska (née Anna Dorota von Fresen), became immortalized after the siege.

Despite Ottoman efforts, the defenders of castle managed to hold their positions after several attacks. After several days, however, shortages of food and water became severe, and Captain Chrzanowski decided to surrender. His wife disagreed with this decision, and threatened to commit suicide if her husband proceeded with the planned surrender, thereby stiffening his spine and creating an atmosphere for defending the castle. Furthermore, Anna Dorota urged the defenders to carry out an attack on Ottoman positions, which resulted in heavy losses among the invaders. Chrzanowska's determination raised the morale among the Poles, but their losses were also heavy. In the night of 4/5 October, only 20 soldiers were able to fight. Facing danger from forces of Jan III Sobieski, which concentrated near Lwow, the Turks decided to end the siege on 11 October.

Even after the Battle of Trembowla, the Sejm still refused his pleas for more funds and a larger army.

== Aftermath ==
The first phase of the war in 1672 ended with a defeat of the Polish forces. However, the second phase of the war ranging from 1673–1676, proved to be inconclusive.

In 1676, after Sobieski's 20,000 withstood the two-week siege of Żurawno, by 50,000 men under Ibrahim Pasha, a new peace treaty was signed, the Treaty of Żurawno. The peace treaty partially reversing those from Buczacz: the Ottomans kept approximately two thirds of the territories they gained in 1672, and the Commonwealth no longer was obliged to pay any kind of tribute to the Empire; a large number of Polish prisoners were released by the Ottomans.

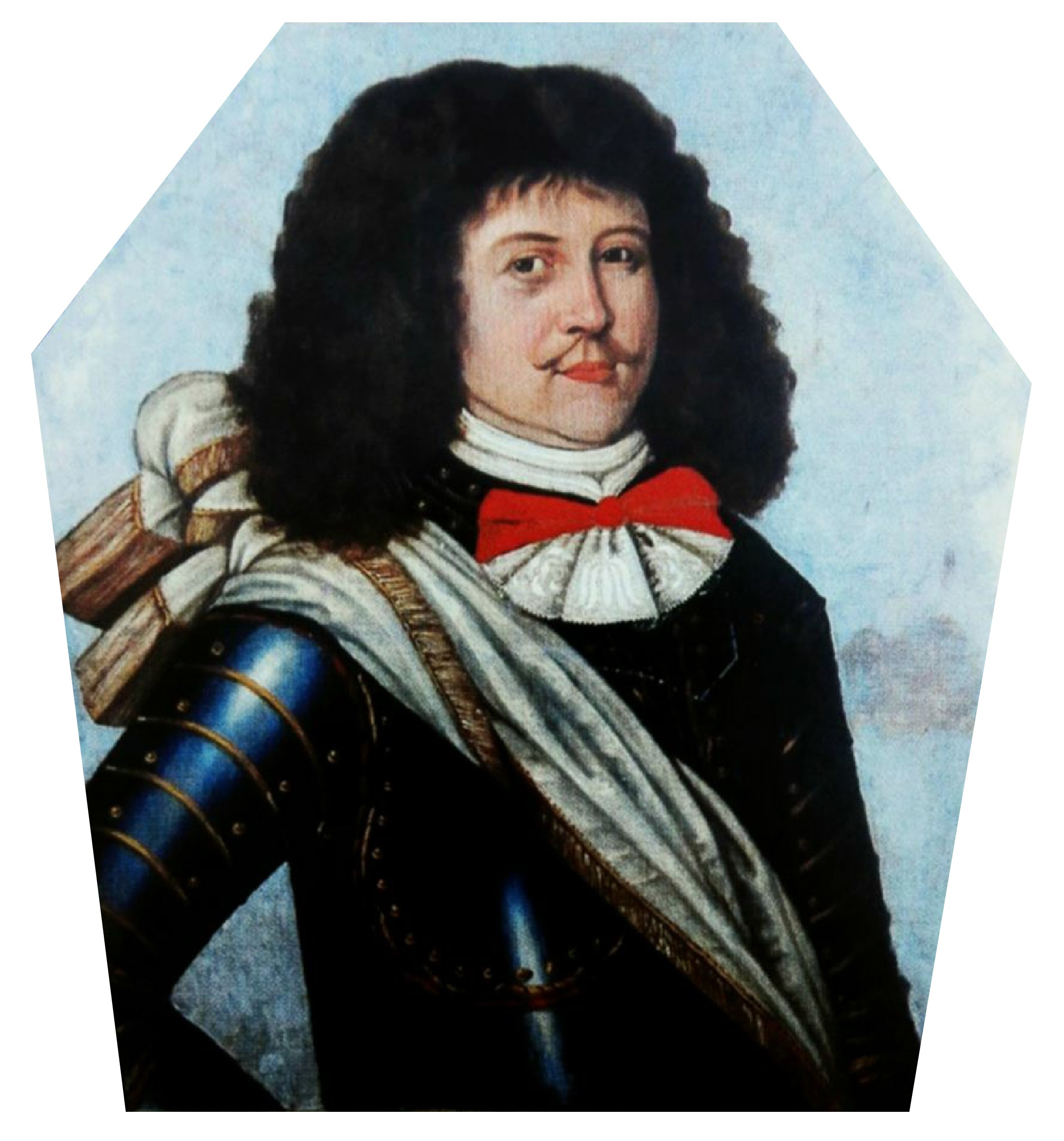
Coffin portrait of captain Zygmunt Dziembowski, who died during the war against Ottoman Empire on 16 December 1674

The Sejm rejected the treaty, through the actions of Austrian diplomats and Pope Innocent XI. Sobieski also was forced to reduce his army from 30,000 to 12,000 men.

The war showed the increasing weakness and disorder of the Commonwealth, who, by 1651, had started its gradual decline that would culminate a century later with the partitions of Poland. The unruly Sejm, paralyzed by liberum veto and foreign bribery, was dominated by politicians who thought in short term gains only and constantly refused the funds to raise an army, as it appeared that most of the Commonwealth would not be ravaged by the Ottoman armies. Even after the unfavourable Buczacz treaty, which convinced the Sejm to raise the taxes, once initial successes were achieved, the majority of the Sejm again couldn't be convinced to keep up the pressure on the enemy; soldiers were left unpaid and desertions on a mass scale negatively affected the Polish cause. This apparent inability to defend itself, also seen in the other recent and future conflicts the Commonwealth was involved in, increasingly invited foreign forces to prey on the Commonwealth.

On the Polish side the fighting was done mostly by a force privately financed by John Sobieski. He gained reputation as an able, courageous commander and a patriot, having invested part of his personal fortune in the defense of the Commonwealth. In 1674 he was elected King of Poland and ruled now as John III. Sobieski's reputation also preceded him in the Ottoman Empire, and his victory several years later at the Battle of Vienna would ensure his reputation as the top commander fighting the Ottomans — however even he would not be able to stop the Commonwealth from decline and introduce reforms that would save the country.

The Commonwealth did regain the territories lost in this war after the Polish–Ottoman War (1683–1699) in the 1699 Treaty of Karlowitz, but that was one of the last of its victories.

== In popular culture ==
The Polish-Ottoman War had a major effect on Poland. Fire in the Steppe is a historical fiction novel, set in the 17th century in the Polish–Lithuanian Commonwealth during the Polish–Tatar and Polish–Ottoman Wars.

Colonel Wolodyjowski is a Polish historical drama film directed by Jerzy Hoffman. The film is based on the novel Fire in the Steppe, the last part in The Trilogy of Henryk Sienkiewicz.

== Bibliography ==
- Bentkowska, Anna (2003). "John Sobieski [Jan III; Jana III; John III], King of Poland". Oxford Art Online. Oxford University Press. doi:10.1093/gao/9781884446054.article.t045004. ISBN 978-1-884446-05-4.
- Davies, Brian L (2007). Warfare, State and Society on the Black Sea Steppe, 1500-1700. London: Routledge. ISBN 9780415239851.
- Polish-Ottoman War, 1672–1676
- Polish Warfare: The Turkish and Tartar Wars 1667–1676 parts 7 and 8
- (in Polish) Wojny polsko-tureckie , Encyklopedia WIEM
- Viorel Panaite, "On Ottoman-Polish Diplomatic Relations", Asian Studies. International Journal for Asian Studies (II/2001),
- Shaw, Stanford J.; Shaw, Ezel K. (1977). History of the Ottoman Empire and Modern Turkey. London: Cambridge University Press.
- Kołodziejczyk, Dariusz (2000). Ottoman-Polish Diplomatic Relations (15th – 18th Century): An Annotated Edition of 'Ahdnames and Other Documents. Leiden – Boston –Köln: Brill.
- Freeman, Edward Augustus (1877). The Ottoman Power in Europe Its Nature, Its Growth, and Its Decline. London: Macmillan. p. 315.
