= Battle of Lwów (1675) =

Battle of the Polish-Ottoman War in 1675

- Part of the Ottoman–Polish War (1672–1676)
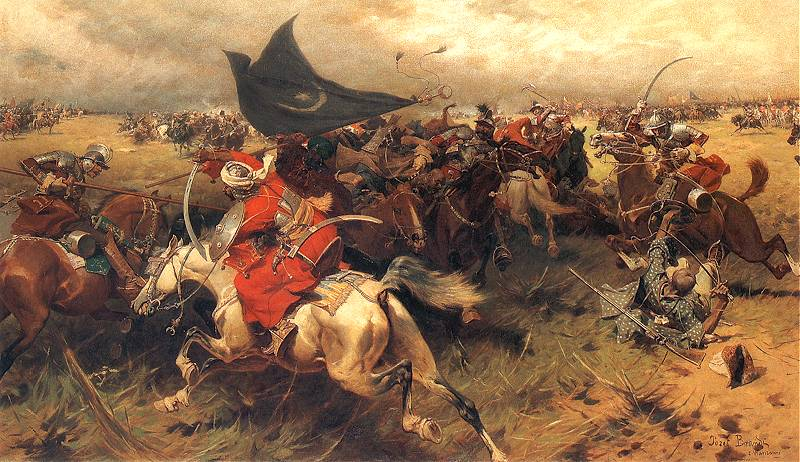
- Polish–Lithuanian cavalry attacking the Ottomans and the Tatars during the battle by Józef Brandt in 1905
Date	24 August 1675
Location	Lwów, Ruthenian Voivodeship, Polish–Lithuanian Commonwealth
Result	Polish–Lithuanian victory

Belligerents
Ottoman Empire; Crimean Khanate	Polish–Lithuanian Commonwealth

Commanders and leaders
Ibrahim Shishman	John III Sobieski

Strength
20,000	4,000 infantry 2,000 cavalry

Casualties and losses
Unknown	Unknown

The Battle of Lwów or Battle of Lesienice or Battle of Lviv refers to a battle between the armies of Polish–Lithuanian Commonwealth and Ottoman Empire that took place near the city of Lwów (Lviv, western Ukraine) on August 24, 1675.

== History ==
=== Before the battle ===
In the early summer of 1675 the Ottoman forces of Ibrahim Şişman (Abraham the Fat) crossed the Polish border into Podolia and started its rapid march towards Lwów along the banks of the Dniester. The army numbered some 20,000 men and was composed of Ottoman infantry and cavalry with significant Crimean Tatar detachments. The Polish king John III Sobieski decided to concentrate his troops in and around Lwów and face the assaulting Muslim army after more reinforcements arrived. The Ottoman commander was notified of the concentration and moved his army to Lwow.

Sobieski decided to split his forces. A unit of 180 infantrymen, 200 light cavalry and several cannons was placed in the easternmost of the ravines leading to the road to Lwów. Most of the heavy cavalry were placed on the road itself, directly behind the valleys and the plain. The left flank of his forces was guarded by 200 Hussars stationed in the village of Zboiska, while the rest of the light cavalry and infantry guarded all other approaches towards the city in case the Ottomans outflanked the defenders and attacked the city from other directions. The remaining taborites and civilians were ordered to group on the hills surrounding the plains. They were given spare lances of the Hussars in order to give the impression that the number of Polish troops was much higher.

=== Battle ===
The Ottomans advance along the route exactly as Sobieski predicted. Convinced that a large group of Hussars were hiding in the woods on the hills, Ibrahim Shyshman ordered a strong group of cavalry to reach the road through one of the ravines. They were stopped by the Polish infantry and then pushed back by a counter-attack of light cavalry. At the same time, Sobieski ordered all troops guarding other approaches towards the city to join the main forces located along the road.

The 1700-strong group of Polish hussars was joined by three banners (300 men) of Lithuanian light cavalry under hetman Michał Kazimierz Radziwiłł. Sobieski ordered the cavalry group to advance through the unguarded western gorge. The ravine was relatively narrow and the Ottomans could not outflank the Polish and Lithuanian cavalry while on the move.

The battle was soon over with Sobieski personally leading. The Pole's pursuit of the Ottoman cavalry lasted until the dusk.

=== Aftermath ===
Sobieski liberates the rest of Poland, and returns to Kraków for his coronation.

The Battle of Lwow is commemorated on the Tomb of the Unknown Soldier, Warsaw, with the inscription "LWOW 24 VIII 1675".

== See also ==
- Battle of Trembowla
- Polish–Lithuanian Commonwealth
- History of Poland
- List of Polish wars
