= Battle of Ładyżyn =

1672 battle during the Polish-Ottoman war

Battle of Ladyzhyn
- Part of Polish-Ottoman War (1672–1676)
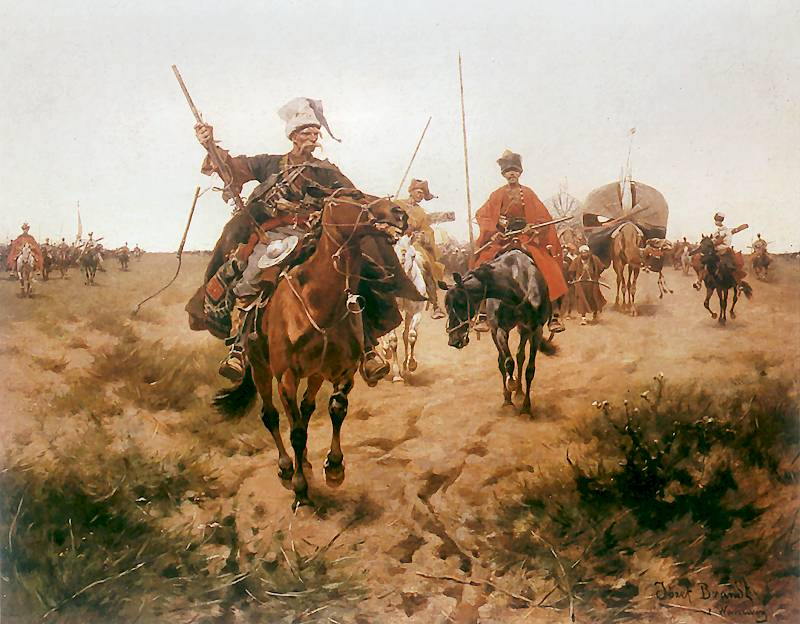
- Cossack Tabor
| Date | 18 July 1672 |
| Location | Ladyzhyn, Ukraine |
| Result | Decisive Ottoman-Crimean and Cossack victory |

Belligerents
| Polish-Lithuanian Commonwealth; Zaporozhian Cossacks | Zaporozhian Cossacks; Crimean Khanate; Ottoman Empire |

Commanders and leaders
| Mykhailo Khanenko; Karol Łużecki | Petro Doroshenko; Hryhoriy Doroshenko; Safa Giray |

Strength
| 4,000 Cossacks (under Khanenko) and Polish cavalry reinforcement | 17,000 (7,000 Cossacks under Doroshenko, 10,000 Tatars and Ottoman Turks) |

Casualties and losses
| 2,100 killed, up to 1,200 wounded | Approx. 1,000 killed |

The Battle of Ladyzhyn or Battle of Ładyżyn (Polish: Bitwa pod Ładyżynem) took place on July 18, 1672, during the Polish–Ottoman War (1672–1676). It involved an Ottoman-Crimean and Cossack coalition against the forces of the Polish–Lithuanian Commonwealth and a pro-Polish Cossack faction. The battle ended in a decisive Ottoman-Crimean and Cossack victory, resulting in the rout of the Polish-Cossack forces under Khanenko and Łużecki.

== The battle ==
In early July 1672, Hetman Petro Doroshenko advanced into Podolia with a force consisting of 7,000 Cossacks and 10,000 Tatars and Ottoman Turks. The Perebiynis Regiment, loyal to Mykhailo Khanenko, began retreating from Bershad but was soon surrounded by Hryhoriy Doroshenko. Khanenko, reinforced by Polish cavalry under Karol Łużecki, launched a rescue operation, managed to cross the Southern Bug River, and temporarily relieved the besieged regiment.

However, encouraged by this initial success, the Polish cavalry pursued the enemy across the river, where they faced a massive counter-offensive by Petro Doroshenko's main forces. The Polish-Cossack forces suffered a major defeat and were routed while trying to retreat back towards Ladyzhyn. The Polish and Khanenko's forces sustained heavy casualties, with 2,100 killed and up to 1,200 wounded, while the victorious Ottoman-Cossack coalition suffered around 1,000 casualties. Following this decisive victory, Doroshenko and Crimean Khan Selim I Giray advanced towards Kamianets-Podilskyi to join the main Ottoman army.
