= Terebovlia Castle =

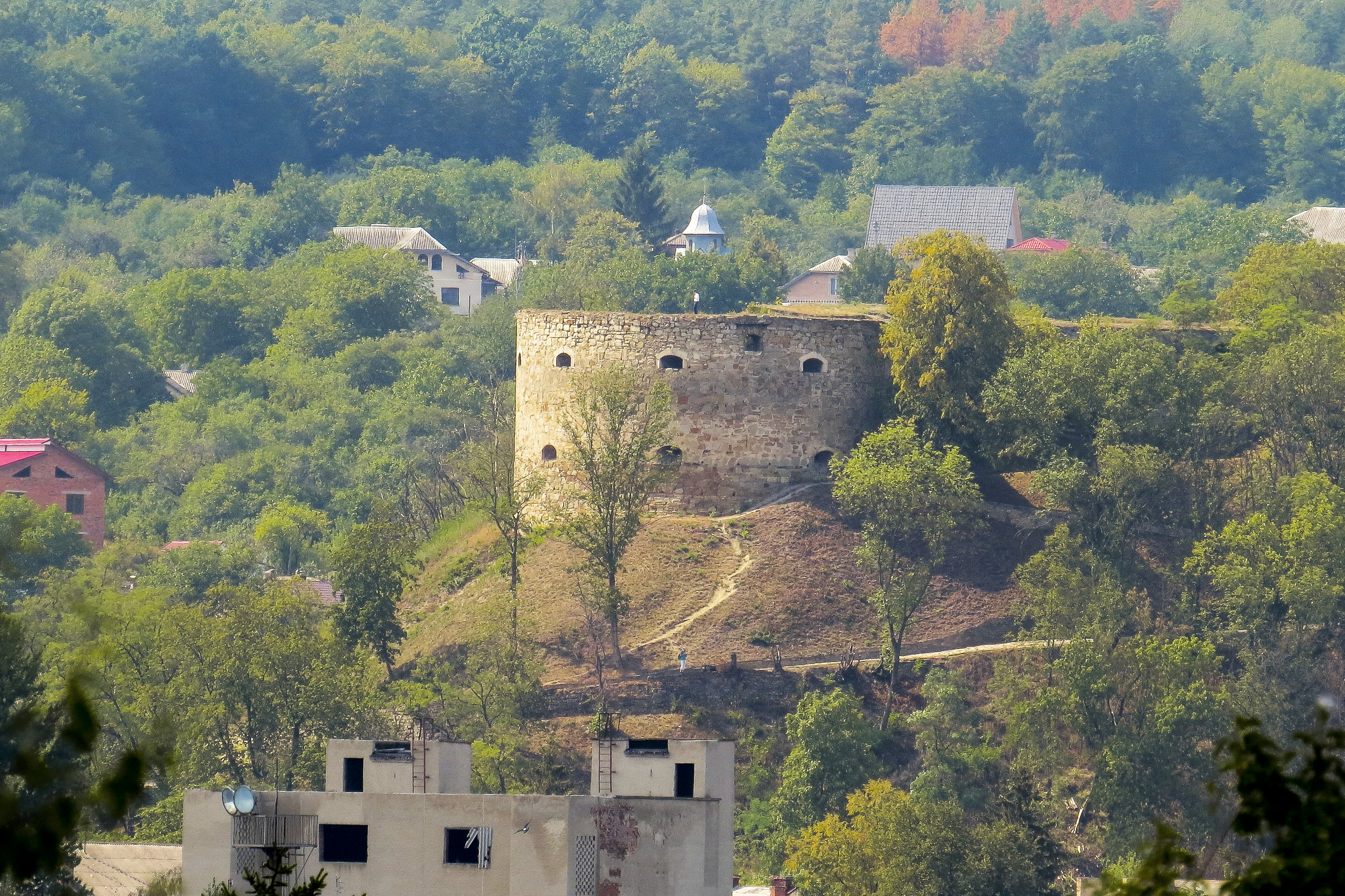

Site information
- Owner: Ukrainian State
- Condition: ruins

Location
- Coordinates: 49°17′57″N 25°41′00″E

Site history
- Built: 1631

Immovable Monument of National Significance of Ukraine
- Official name: Замок (Castle)
- Type: Architecture, History
- Reference no.: 190013

The Terebovlia Castle (Ukrainian: Теребовлянський замок) is a ruined 17th-century castle in the town of Terebovlia in western Ukraine.

The ruins are located on the edge of Gniezny canyon, near its mouth to Seret River. The fortification, the remains of which can still be seen, was built in the 1630s under the leadership of the Terebovlian starosta Aleksander Bałaban.

== History ==
There have been at least three fortresses on the castle hill in Terebovlia. The first historical castle in the town, mentioned in the Old Russian writing Primary Chronicle, was a castle erected in 9th/10th century. The city achieved its greatest power during the reign of Prince Vasylko Rostyslavych, the great-grandson of the Grand Duke of Kiev Yaroslav the Wise.

Prince Vasylko Rostyslavych's fortress was a wooden, enclosed palisade, and only the castle church within it was built of stone. The fortress had several defensive lines, but there was no water well. Archeologists suggest that the water was brought here underground or simply filled the reservoirs. This original castle was not like the one that has survived until now. Even the entrance to it was not from the east, as it is now, but from the north - from the modern park. There were cellars under the castle.

After the death of Vasylko Rostyslavych in 1124, the Principality of Terebovlia became part of the Principality of Halych, and later part of the Halych-Volhynia principality. With the reign of Vladimir Igorevich of the Izyaslavych family, Terebovlya regained its independence. However, in 1211, in the battle with the Magyars, the prince was captured and executed along with his brothers and father. In those days, the wooden walls of the castle were replaced by stone, but in 1241 Terebovlia was completely destroyed by the hordes of Batu Khan. In 1341 the city is already mentioned as being conquered by the Poles. In 1346 the Polish king Casimir III the Great rebuilt the fortress. Little is known about this newer castle, but it was stone and walled. In 1448 Kazimierz Jagiellończyk stayed here. In 1534, the castle was extended by Kraków castellan Andrzej Tęczyński.

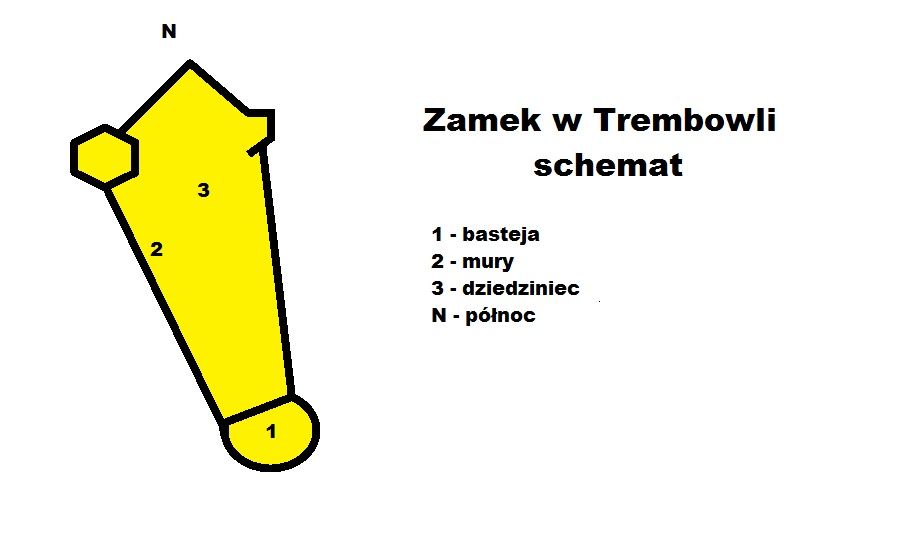
Plan of Terebovlia Castle

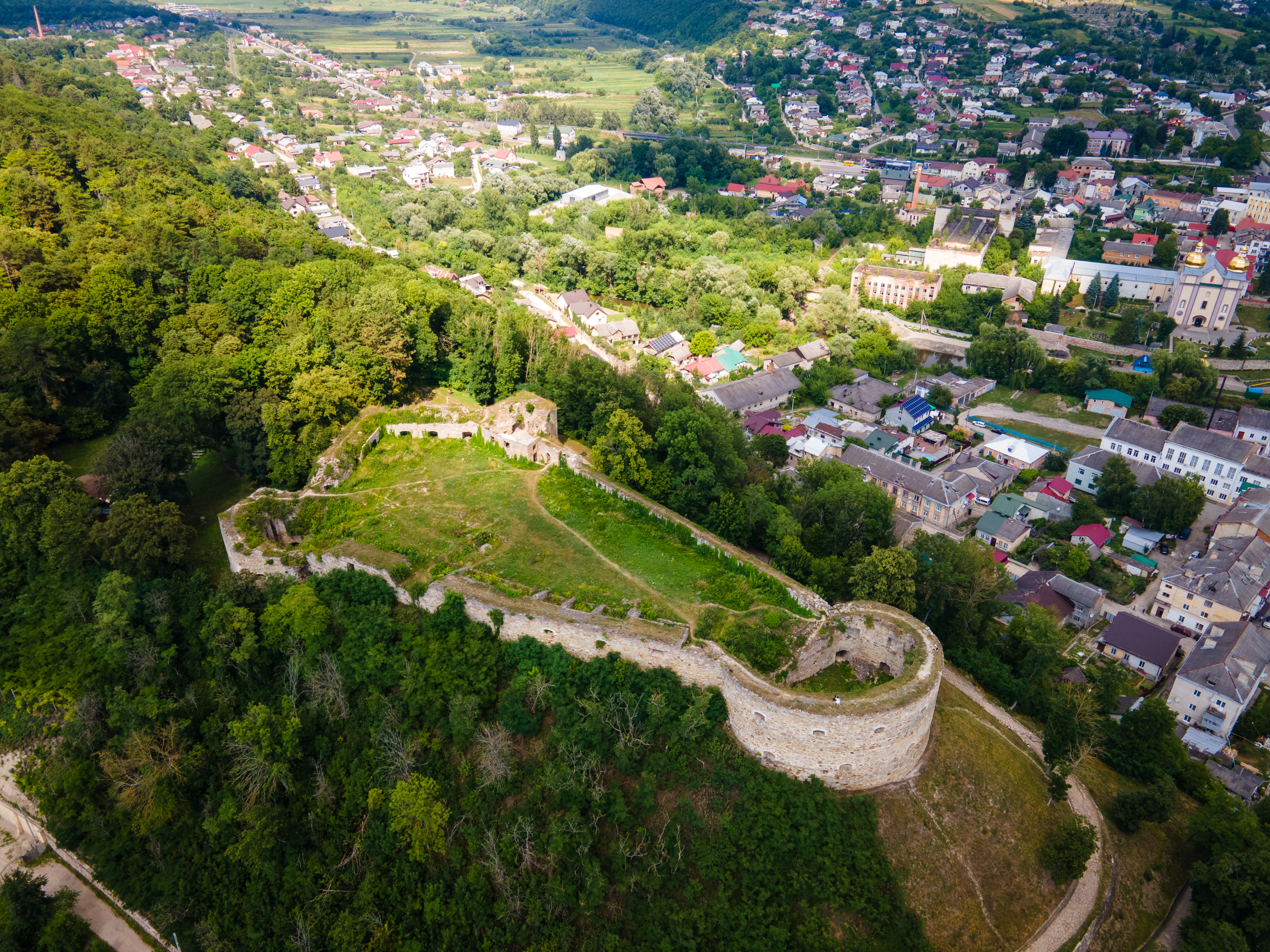
Aerial view of Terebovlia Castle

During the 15th and 16th centuries Terebovlya fortress declined in importance due to constant attacks by Tatars. Within a few months, the Terebovlian Andrzej Tęczyński - a castellan of the then Polish capital of Krakow - rebuilt it at his own expense. The necessity of repairing the castle was mentioned in the privilege of King Stephen Báthory from 30 November 1576 (a copy was preserved ).

In 1594 (July 1595), Terebovlya was acquired by Severyn Nalyvaiko, but the castle was not damaged at that time. At the end of the 16th century the castle was repaired by the Terebovlian headman Jakub Pretwitch.

From 1605-1625 the castle's importance declined after suffering 15 attacks by Crimean Tatars. Following these events, it was the turn of the fortress to build a stroll now. In 1631 the castle was rebuilt by the Trembowel starosta Andrzej Bałaban. The walls reach 3.5-5m in thickness and up to 18m in height. The entrance to the castle was made at height of 3m above the ground and could only be reached with the help of a special platform. It is suggested that during this castle renovation the church with grave of prince Vasylko Rostyslavych was destroyed.

Cossacks captured castle in 1648, but after the armistice it was occupied by the Poles and frequently resisted attacks by Cossacks, Turks and Tatars.

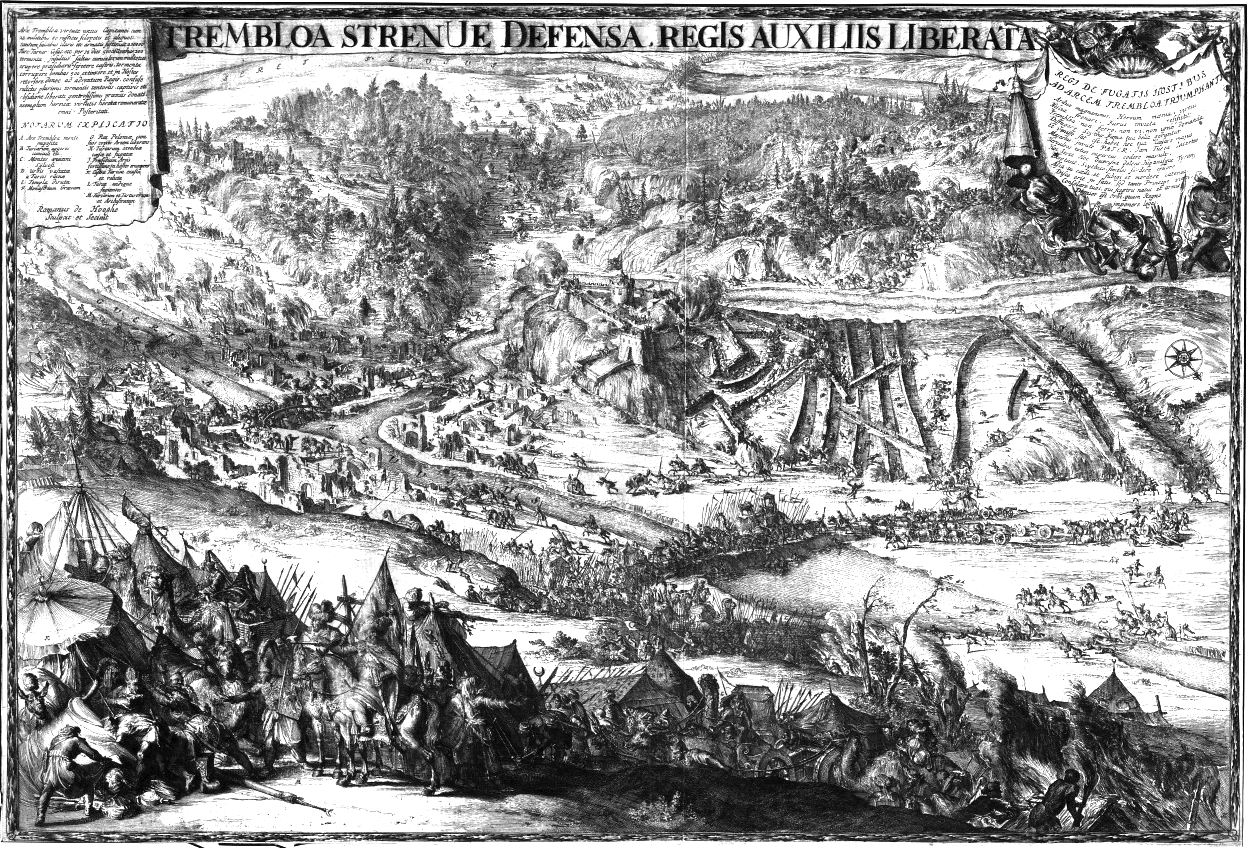
An engraving depicting the Siege of Trembowla (1675) during the Polish–Ottoman War, created by the Dutch artist Romeyn de Hooghe

In course of Polish–Ottoman War (1672–1676) Terebovlia castle became an important border fortress after the partition of Podolia by Turkey in 1671. Armistice in war followed by Treaty of Buchach which ultimately was rejected by Sejm of the Polish–Lithuanian Commonwealth and war resumed. In 1675 Mehmed IV sent a new 10,000-strong Turkish-Tatar army under command of Pasha Ibrahim Shyshman to enter Ukraine and on 20 September the siege of Terebovlya began. Despite considerable numerical advantage, Pasha Ibrahim Shyshman was unable to capture the castle and on 11 October retreated south in anticipation of the early start of winter season. This saved the rest of Podillya, Galicia from the attack. Terebovlia castle became famous for its heroic defense against Tatars and Turks.

During the 18th and 19th centuries the castle was left unattended and decayed. The lower parts of the walls have been preserved. Currently the castle belongs to the Castles of Ternopil Oblast National Reserve.

== See also ==
- Battle of Trembowla
