= Aleksander Lesser =

Polish artist (1814–1884)

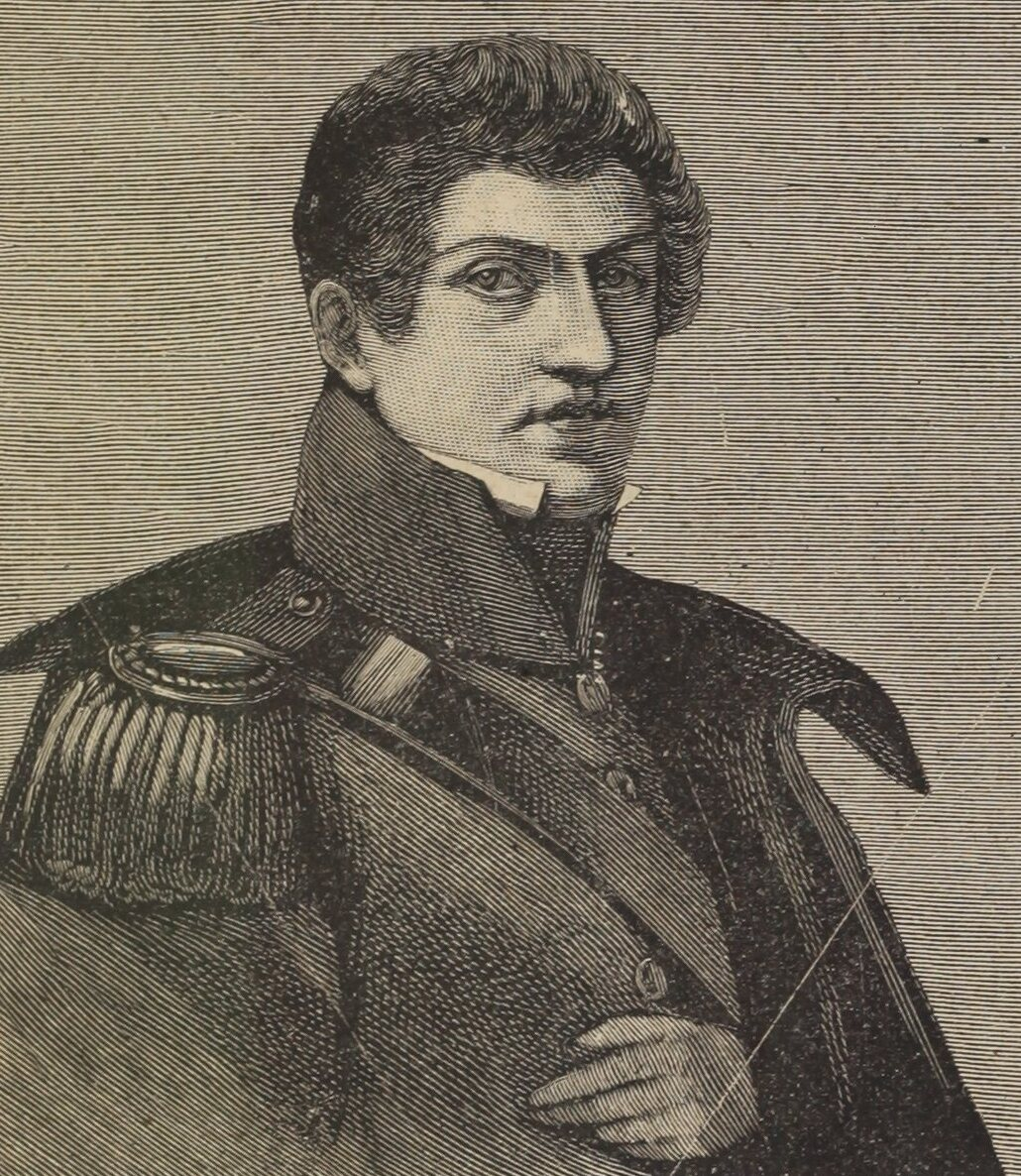
- Self-portrait, 1850
- Born: 13 May 1814; Warsaw, Duchy of Warsaw
- Died: 13 March 1884 (aged 69); Kraków, Austria-Hungary
- Education: University of Warsaw
- Known for: Painting
- Movement: History painting

Aleksander Lesser (13 May 1814 – 13 March 1884) was a Polish painter, illustrator, sketch artist, art critic, and amateur researcher of antiquities. Lesser was Jewish, and became one of the first artists to depict scenes from modern Jewish history in Poland. He specialized in Polish historical and contemporary themes, and he was known and respected in artistic and scholarly circles. He was a member of Kraków's Academy of Learning and co-founder of Warsaw's Zachęta, the Society for Encouragement of the Fine Arts.

== Early life ==
Aleksander Lesser was born in Warsaw in 1814 to Levy Lesser (1791–1870), a well-known trader and banker, and Róża Loewenstein (1790–1840). Lesser's formal study of painting began in the Warsaw Lyceum under Aleksander Kokular before continuing at the Faculty of Fine Arts at the Royal University of Warsaw in 1830–1831 under Antoni Brodowski, the Polish romantic painter. This university was closed by the imperial Russian authorities after the Polish uprising of 1831; thus, between 1832 and 1835, Lesser continued his studies at the Academy of Fine Arts in Dresden, where he studied with Moritz Retzsch and Karl Christian Vogel.

Between 1836 and 1846, Lesser studied in Munich under Peter Cornelius, Heinrich Hess, and Julius Schnorr von Carolsfeld; these individuals were prominent representatives of German romanticism who called themselves Nazarenes. In 1843, Lesser became friends with a prominent Polish poet named Cyprian Kamil Norwid (Norwid later emigrated).

== Career ==
Lesser returned to Warsaw in 1846, where he was widely praised for his treatment of historical and religious (primarily Christian) themes, as well as for his portraits and genre scenes. Many of his paintings, including Obrona Trembowli (The Defense of Trembowla; 1840), were interpreted by both critics and the public as allegories of the Polish struggle for independence.

He began giving a more important role to Jewish themes in his work in the 1860s, thus becoming one of the first artists to paint scenes from modern Polish Jewish history. In addition, Lesser began painting and sketching scenes from Polish Jewish history upon the encouragement of Joachim Lelewel, a historian and advocate of Polish independence who was living in exile.

In 1860, he was a co-founder of the Society for the Encouragement of the Fine Arts, an organization which aimed to promote art for the mutual benefit of both artists and society at large (and which still exists to this day). Lesser was a member of the executive committee of this organization from 1864 to 1883, and he served on the Commission on Art History in the Academy of Arts and Sciences in Kraków starting from 1878. Lesser died in 1884 at the age of 69. Nowadays, his works are mostly located in the National Museum in Warsaw (more than 436 drawings and sketches), in the National Museum in Kraków, and in collections in Poznań and Lviv.

== Works ==
His most famous paintings include:

- The Defense of Trembowla against the Turks (1841)
- The Funeral of the Five Fallen in 1861 (1861), depicting the funeral of Poles of Catholic and Hebrew descent who had been murdered by Russian Cossacks. The painting includes Roman Catholic, Eastern Orthodox and Jewish clergymen.
- Portraits of Polish Kings – 40 portraits of Polish monarchs. The paintings, together with commentaries, were published in Warsaw in 1860.

Also notable are:

- The Recovery of Wanda's Body from the Wisła River
- Kadłubek Writing His Chronicle at a Monastery
- Young Boleslaw Wrymouth Departs Moravia
- The Coronation of Leszek I the White
- The Prussian Tribute
- Copernicus' Last Moments
- Paintings with Christian themes, e.g., The Transfiguration of Jesus; Mary Magdalen.

== Gallery ==
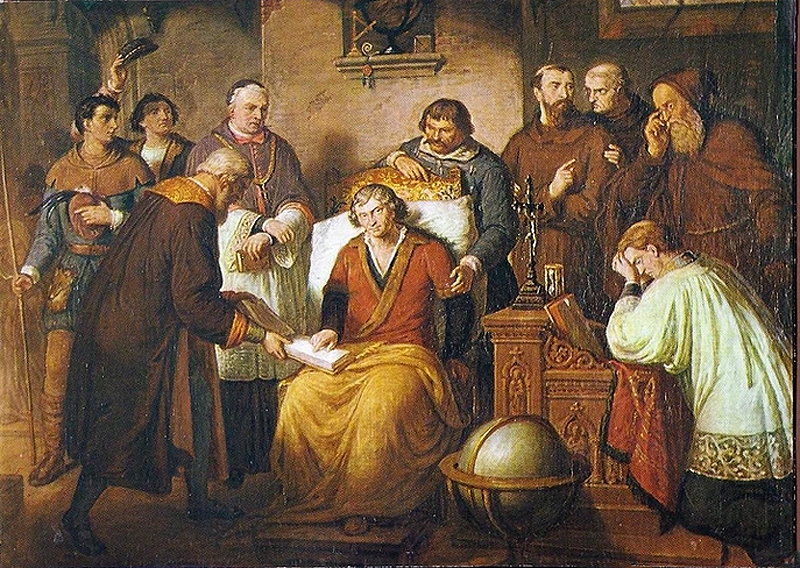
Copernicus On His Deathbed (c. 1884)

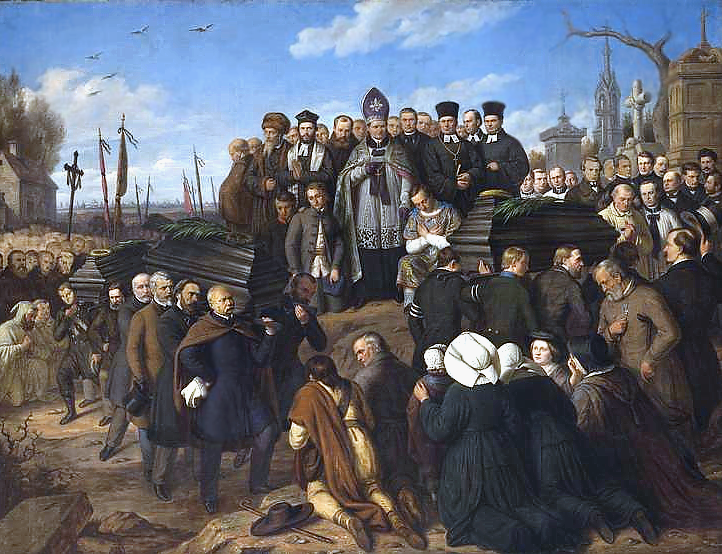
The Funeral of the Five Fallen in 1861 (1861), National Museum, Kraków

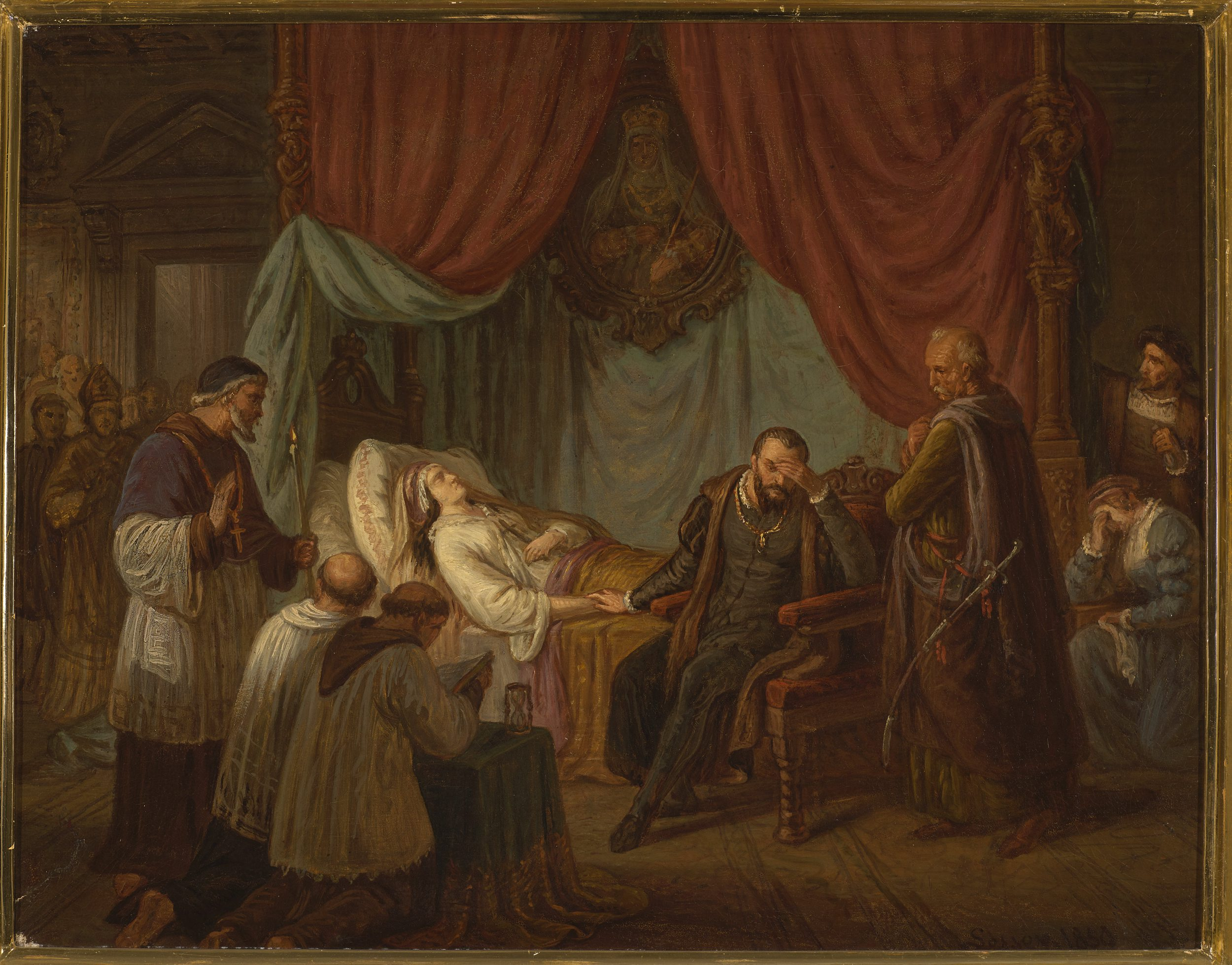
Death of Barbara Radziwiłł, (1859), National Museum in Warsaw

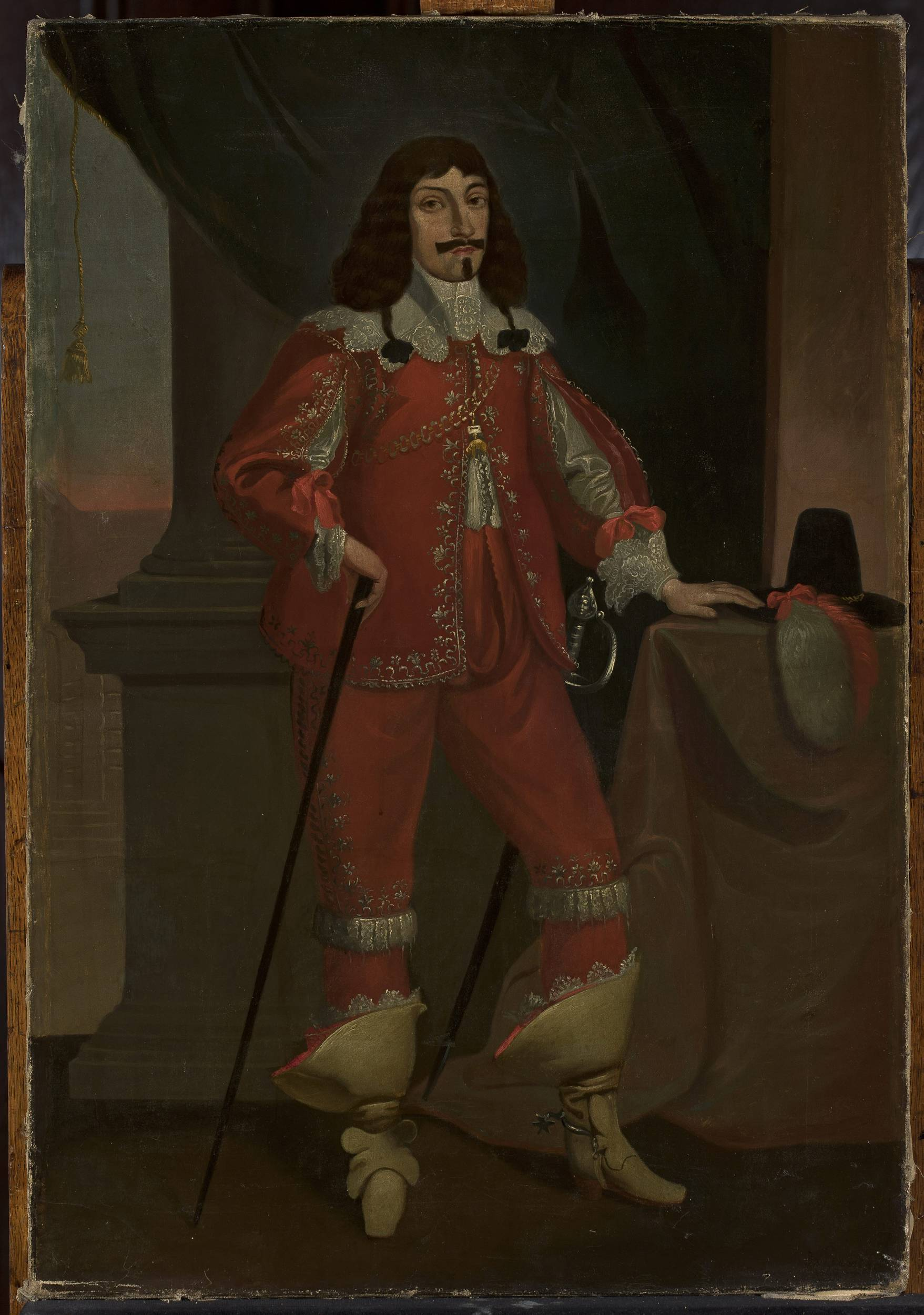
Portrait of John II Casimir Vasa, (1850), National Museum in Warsaw

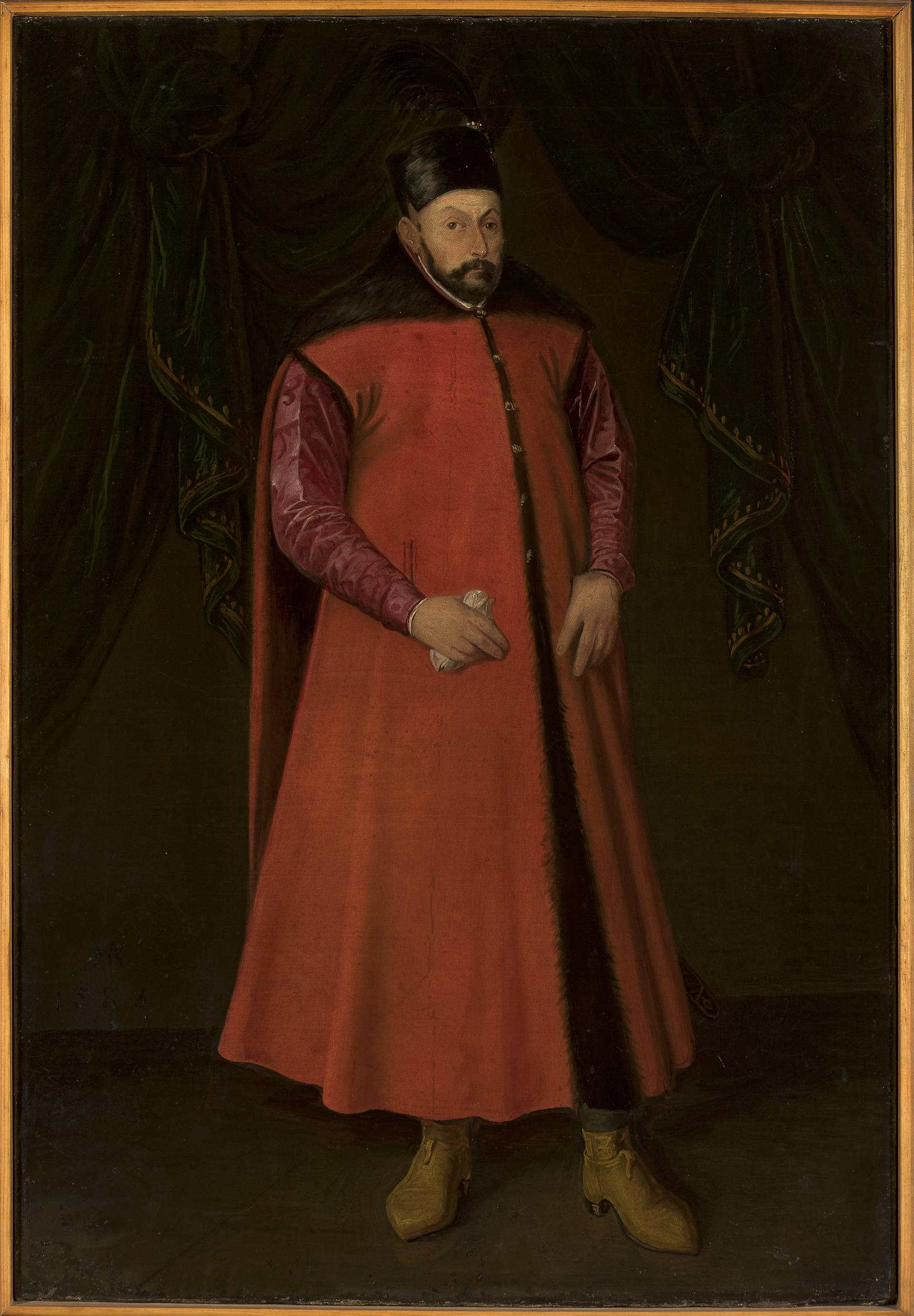
Portrait of Stephen Báthory, (1846), National Museum in Warsaw

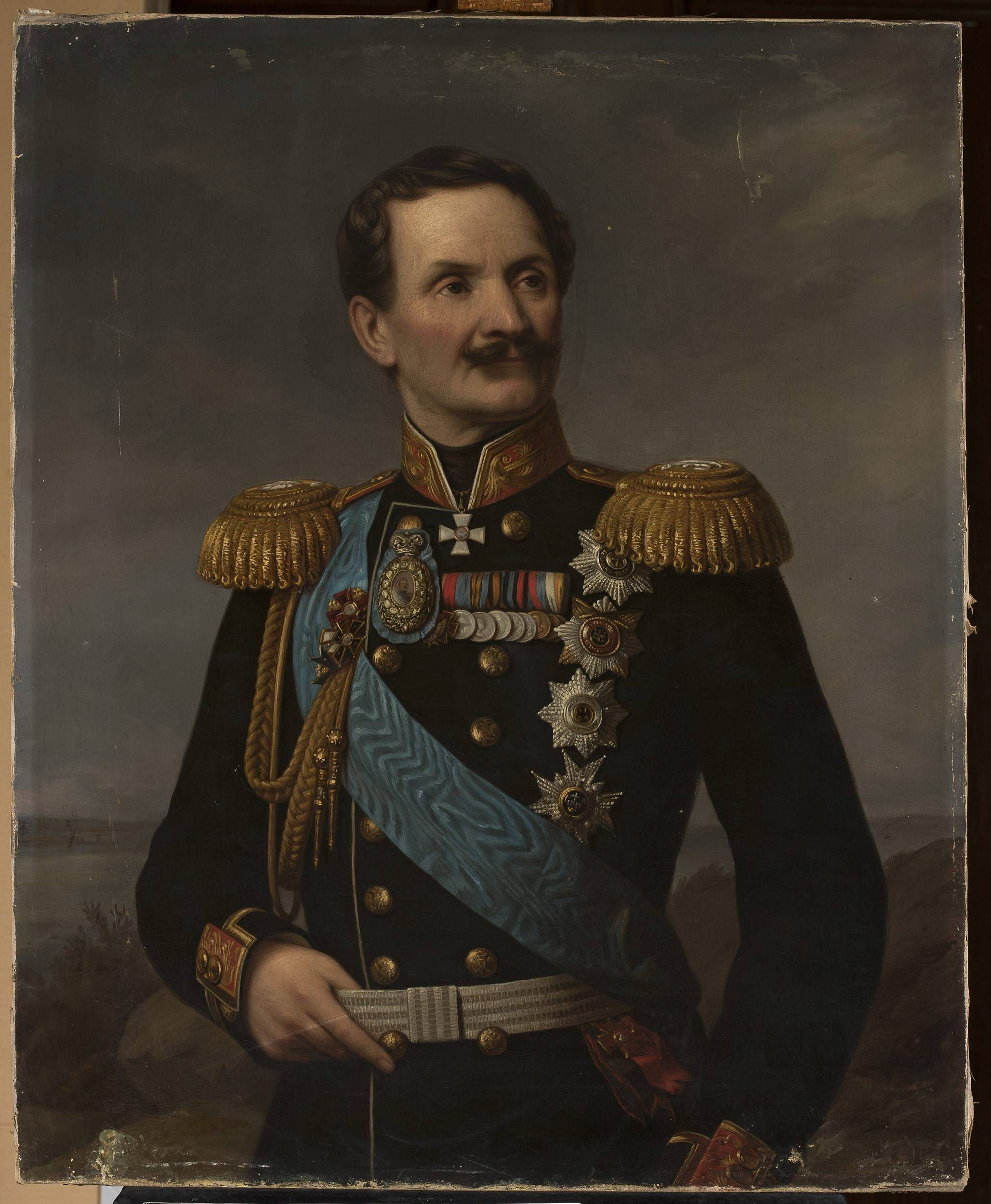
Portrait of Friedrich Berg, (1868), National Museum in Warsaw

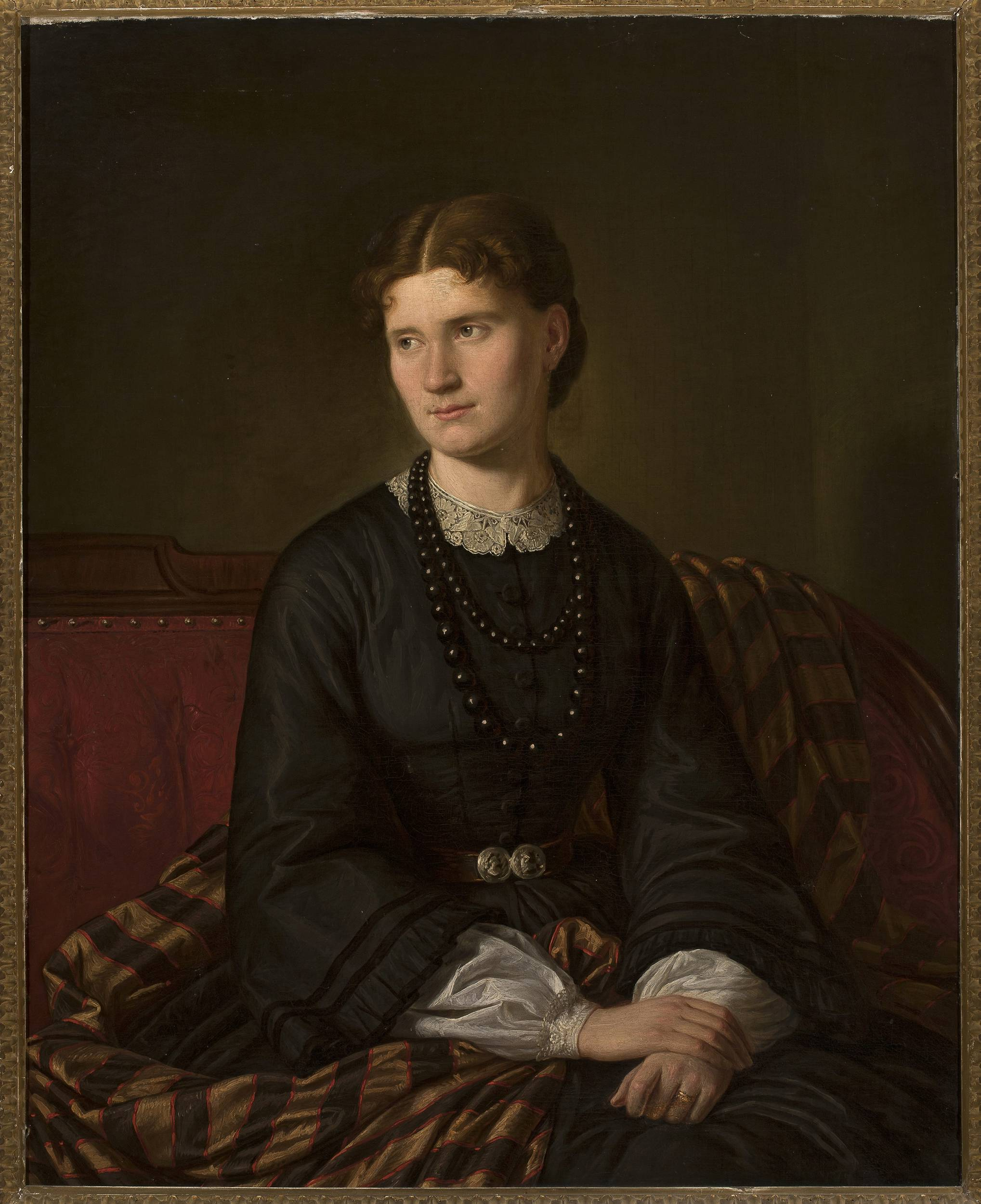
Portrait of Julia née Bergson, artist’s wife, National Museum in Warsaw

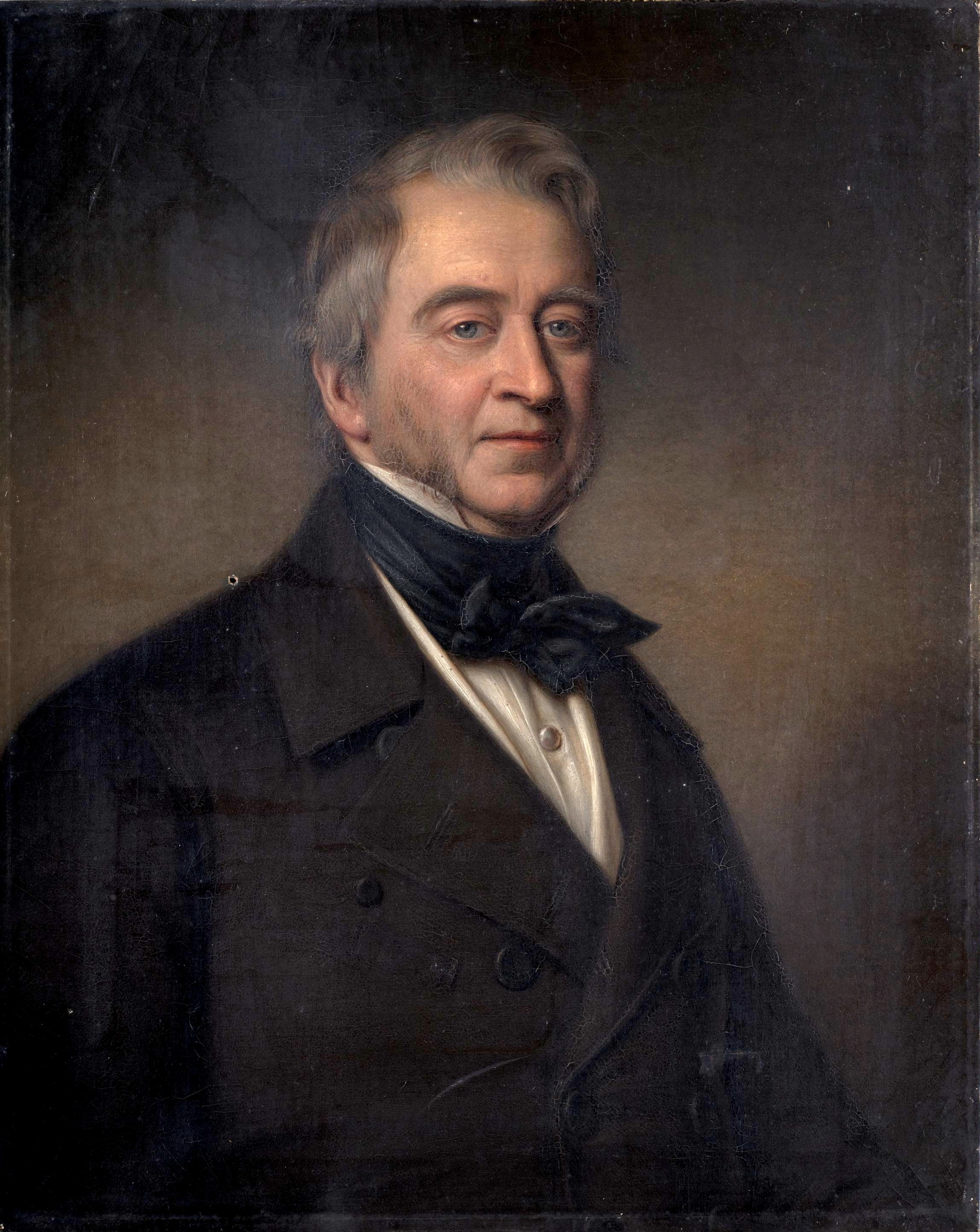
Stanisław Kostka Zamoyski, (c. 1845), Kórnik Castle

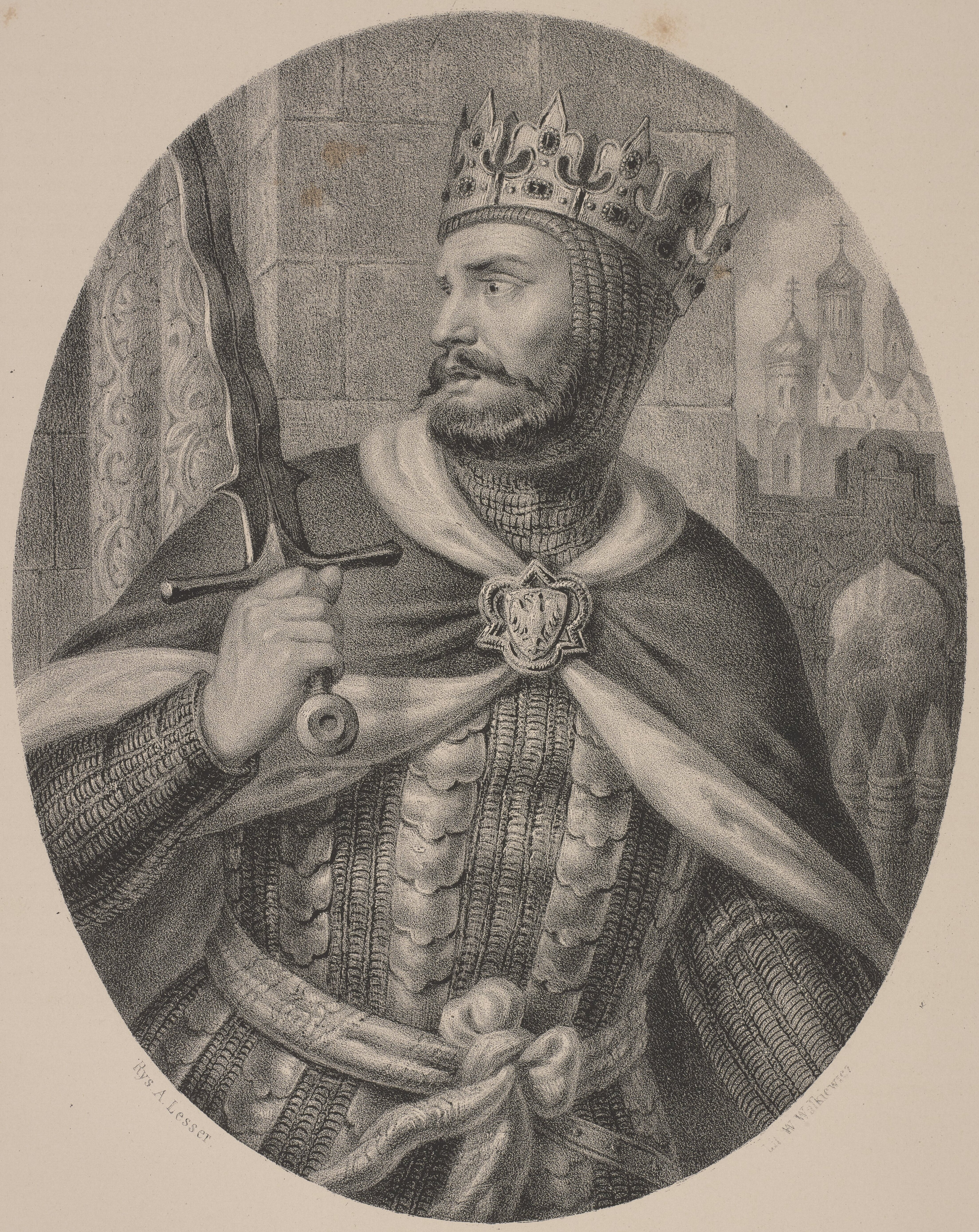
Bolesław I Chrobry from the series of portraits depicting Kings and Dukes of Poland

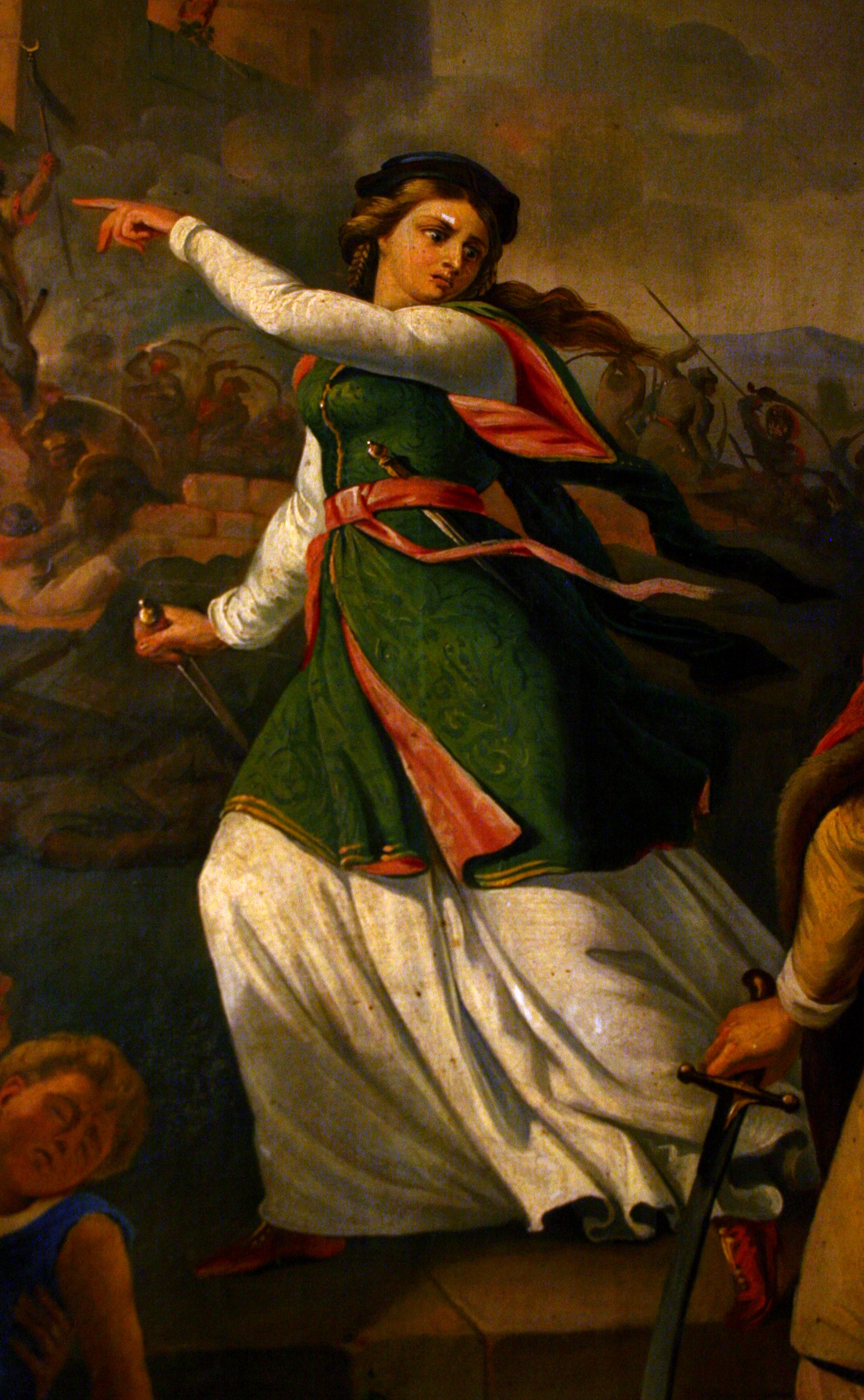
The Defence of Trembowla against the Turks, Diocesan Museum, Sandomierz

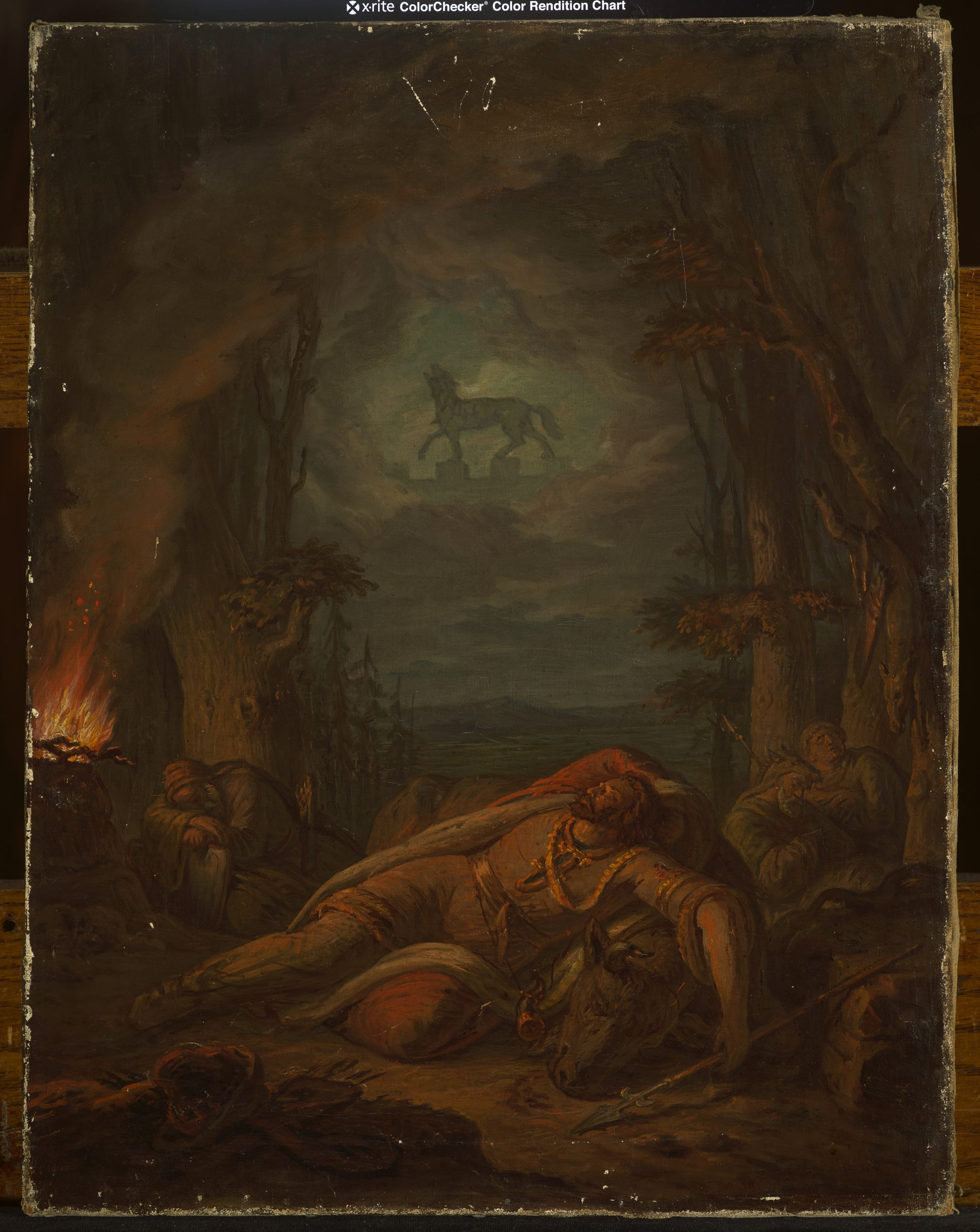
Dream of Gediminas about the Iron Wolf, National Museum in Warsaw

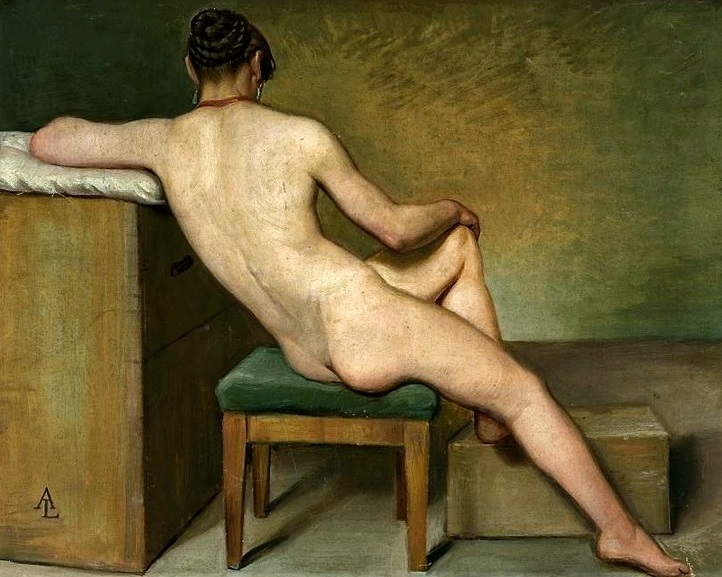
Female nude

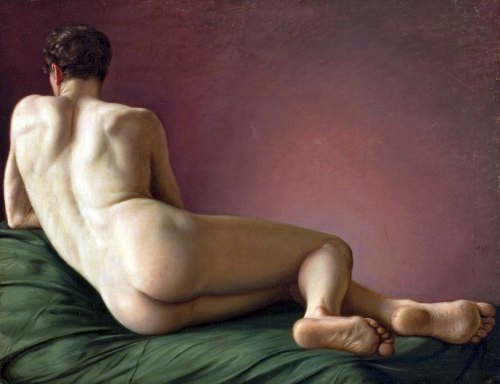
Reclining male nude

== See also ==
- List of Polish painters
