= Leopold Loeffler =

Polish realist painter

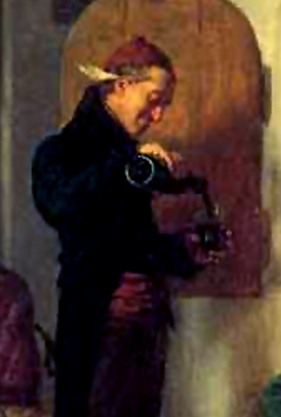
- Artist at his studio (feather-pen behind his ear) pouring himself "A glass of wine", Leopold Loeffler, oil on canvas (fragment)
- Born: October 27, 1827; Rzeszów, Poland
- Died: February 6, 1898 (aged 70); Kraków, Poland
- Education: Academies of Fine Arts in Vienna, Munich, Paris

Leopold Loeffler, also spelled Löffler, (October 27, 1827 – February 6, 1898), was a Polish realist painter of the late Romantic period popular in the second half of the 19th century under the foreign partitions of Poland. Lithographic reproductions of his paintings were widely distributed among the members of the Kraków and Warsaw art societies, and frequently reprinted in popular periodicals owing to their historical references to Polish national uprisings and battlefronts, as well as their great attention to period detail.

A member of the Vienna Academy of Fine Arts since 1866 and at the height of his artistic career, Loeffler was invited to Kraków by Polish national painter Jan Matejko in 1877. There he accepted a position as professor at the expanding School of Fine Arts, but nevertheless remained a prolific artist for the rest of his life. Loeffler died in Kraków in 1898. His work can be found in the National Museum of Poland, its regional branches and in the Lviv National Art Gallery

== Life and work ==
Leopold Loeffler was born on October 27, 1827, in Rzeszów under the Austrian Partition, the son of an administrative officer Jan Loeffler (surname also Germanized as Löffler), and his wife Domicella née Dąbrowska. His father was an office manager locally before moving his family to Lwów (now Lviv, Ukraine) in order to take up the position of a district secretary. Leopold went to school in Radymno, where his uncle Filip Loeffler was a post-master. Upon graduation, he enrolled at the Department of Philosophy of the Lwów University. At about that time, he also rediscovered his interest in painting and in 1845 left the partitioned Poland for Vienna, to continue his studies at the Academy of Fine Arts there.

For the next 30 years Loeffler lived abroad, mostly in Austria (known as Austria-Hungary since 1867), but also in Munich and in Paris, where he continued his studies at the local art academies. Galicia, where his family lived, became the easternmost province of the Habsburg Empire. Loeffler embarked on a successful career as an artist, painting victorious battle scenes for Archduke Rudolph among other prestigious commissions. His work was highly regarded by the court of Franz Joseph I of Austria and the Emperor himself, while his German-sounding name was also commercially advantageous. In 1866 he became a member of the Vienna Academy of Fine Arts. However, Loeffler left the imperial capital for Kraków in 1877, having been invited by Matejko to serve as Professor at the School of Fine Arts, expanded in 1873 as an independent institution of higher learning. Among his most prominent students were future luminaries of the Young Poland movement including Stanisław Wyspiański, Włodzimierz Tetmajer, Leon Kowalski and Wojciech Weiss. He died in Kraków on February 6, 1898, at the age of 70.

Selected historical paintings
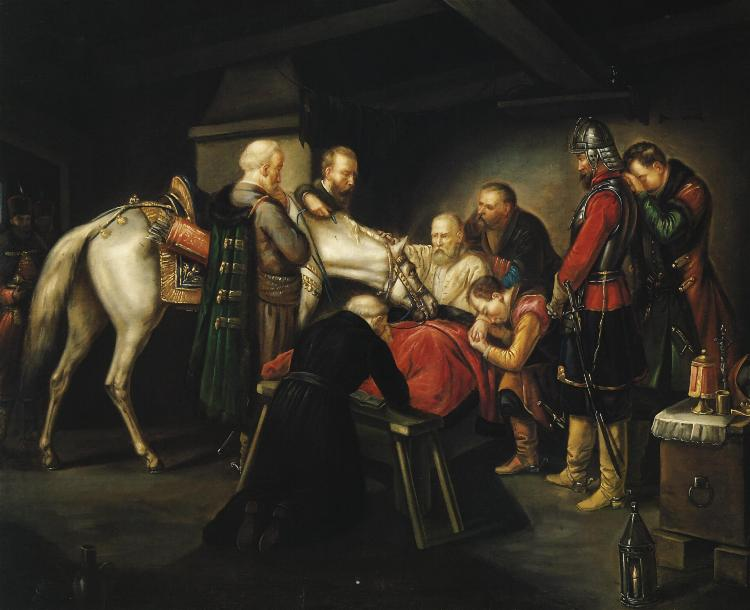
Death of Stefan Czarniecki, National Museum in Warsaw

The return from captivity

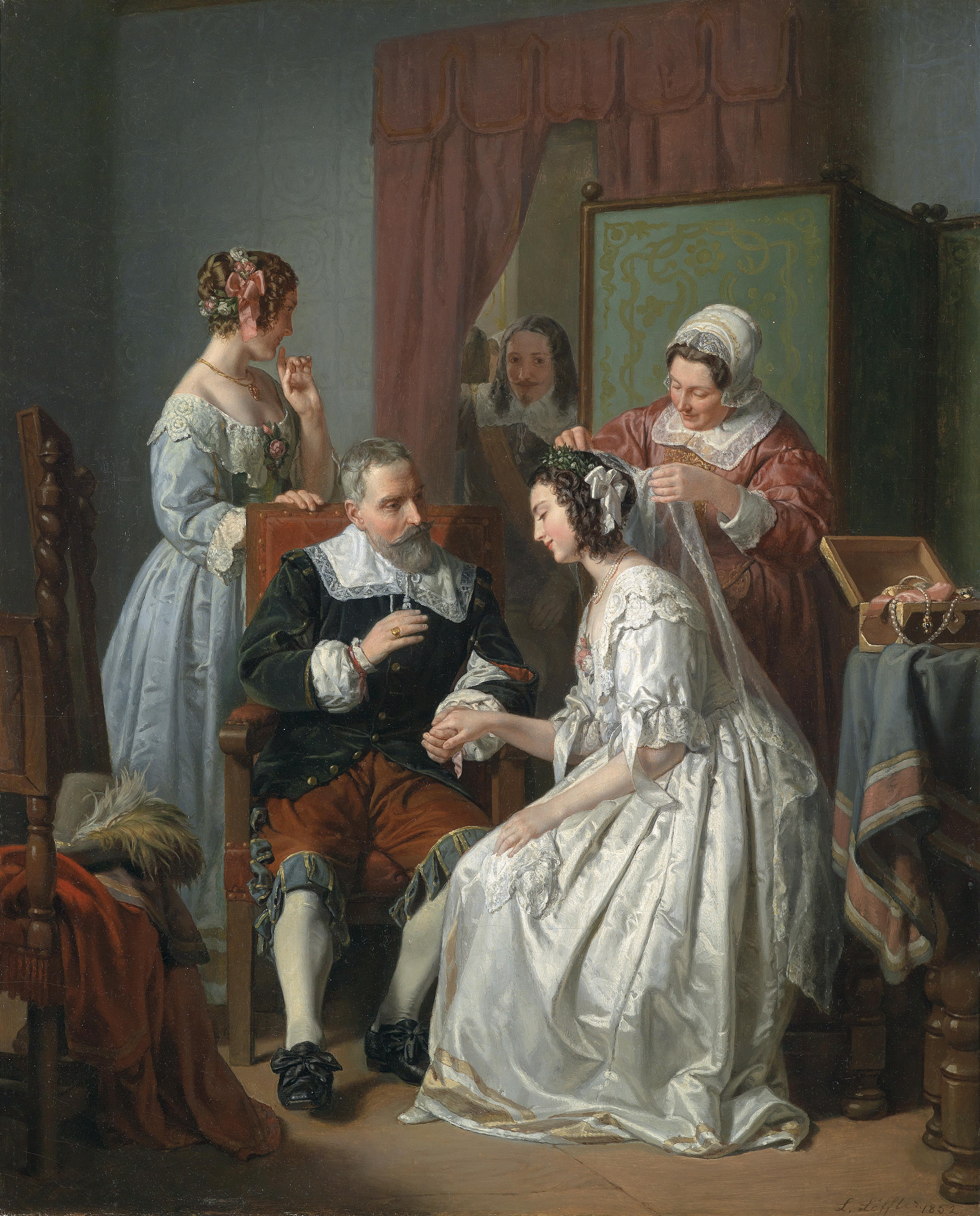
Family from Radymno

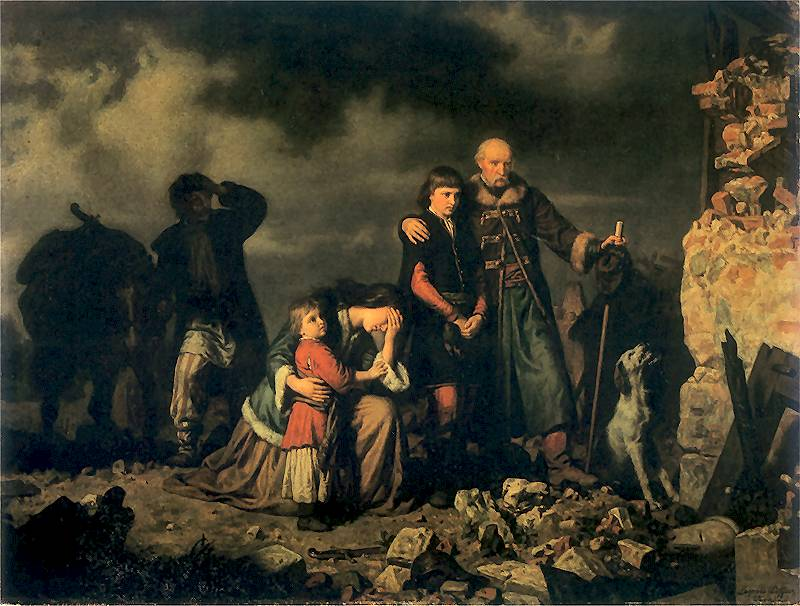
Grieving after the Tartar raid, Lviv National Art Gallery

== Controversy ==
Although, Leopold Loeffler saw himself as the great supporter of freedom and national sovereignty, at least some of his commissions painted for the Austrian court inadvertently also glorified the military victories of the Habsburgs over less fortunate nations. In 1860 Loeffler produced a battle scene for Archduke Rudolf, showing the victorious Emperor Rudolph I of Germany in 1278, destroying the Czech ruler Ottokar II of Bohemia in the Battle on the Marchfeld (Czech: Suché Kruty) at Dürnkrut. The battle was lost in an ambush attack, a dishonorable act by the rules of knighthood. Most importantly, it also took away the Czech hopes of freedom for centuries to come. Such ideologically motivated depictions of imperial history of Austria-Hungary did not contribute to Loeffler's popularity in his native land under the foreign domination.

== Notes and references ==
Media related to Leopold Löffler at Wikimedia Commons

== Bibliography ==
- Polski słownik biograficzny, vol. XVII, Wrocław, Warszawa, Kraków, Gdańsk 1972, pp. 513–514
- Słownik artystów polskich i obcych w Polsce działających (zmarłych przed 1966 r). Malarze, rzeźbiarze, graficy, vol. V, Warszawa 1993, pp. 128–132.
