= Battle of Falun =

Battle in the Swedish War of Liberation

- Part of Swedish War of Liberation
Date	February 5, 1521
Location	Falun, Sweden 60°36′26″N 15°37′52″E
Result	Swedish victory
Territorial changes	Falun sacked, local fogde captured

Belligerents
Sweden	Denmark

Commanders and leaders
Gustav Vasa; Lasse Olsson	Kristoffer Olsson (Stjärna)

Strength
A few hundred mustered Dalecarlian peasants	

The Battle of Falun (Swedish: Slaget om Falun) was the first battle of the Swedish War of Liberation that took place in Falun, Sweden, on February 5, 1521. Swedish rebels under Gustav Vasa, who had just days earlier been proclaimed leader of the Dalecarlians against the Danes, raided Falun. The rebels, consisting of a few hundred poorly armed peasants and some noble officers, took the Danish forces in the town completely by surprise. The local fogde (bailiff) Kristoffer Olsson and a few others labelled as "traitors" were captured. Local shops run by German merchants were plundered, and the population taxed.

The rebels continued onwards through the region, gaining many new recruits. Shortly after they returned to Falun, and the locals pledged allegiance to Gustav Vasa and his cause. The rebellion continued until the Treaty of Malmö in 1524. A year earlier, in 1523, Vasa was crowned King of Sweden.
