= Siege of Kalmar (1525) =

1525 siege

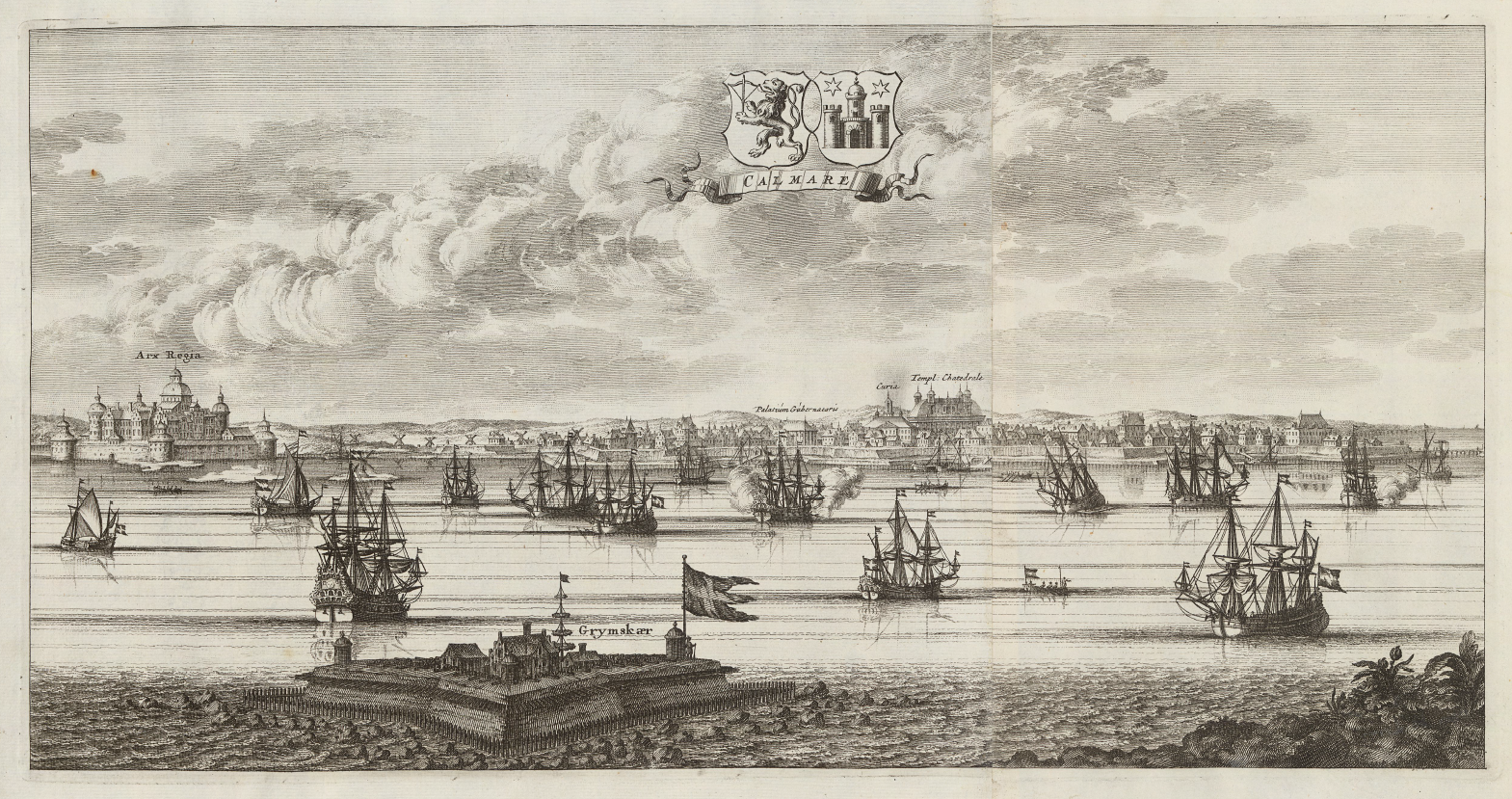
- Depiction of Kalmar from Suecia antiqua et hodierna (Willem Swidde, 1693)
Date	? – 20 July 1525
Location	Kalmar, Småland 56°39′41″N 16°21′46″E
Result	Swedish victory
Territorial changes	Kalmar is captured by Swedish forces

Belligerents
Sweden	Kalmar garrison

Commanders and leaders
Gustav Vasa; Nils Eriksson; Jon Olofsson; Peder Fredag †; Arvid Västgote (WIA)	Berend von Melen; Henrik von Melen; Nils Stensson Sture (POW)

Units involved
Peder Fredag's Fähnlein	Kalmar garrison

Strength
Thousands of men Multiple guns	50 men

Casualties and losses
~396 killed	25 killed in combat 60–76 executed

The siege of Kalmar (Swedish: Belägringen av Kalmar) occurred in 1525 when a Swedish army led by Gustav Vasa laid siege to and conquered the city from its garrison.

During an invasion of Gotland in 1524, the Swedish commander, Berend von Melen, had accepted a dinner invitation from Søren Norby, who commanded the city of Visby on the island. This action was interpreted as a betrayal by Gustav Vasa, who summoned Berend to Stockholm, where he was promptly arrested. Earlier, the city of Kalmar had been given to Berend in the aftermath of its abandonment. In order to recapture it, Gustav Vasa sent a large army and fleet to do so. However, when they arrived, the garrison, which was now commanded by Henrik von Melen, refused their entry to the castle. Thus, the castle was besieged. Despite two assaults being repelled with heavy casualties for the King's army, the garrison was eventually forced to capitulate since it had also suffered heavy casualties.

After capturing the city, the remaining garrison was executed en masse in what has been described as a bloodbath.

== Background ==
Throughout the Swedish War of Liberation, negotiations between Sweden and Lübeck for the latter’s support had been organized by the German nobleman Berend von Melen, who held close contact with the city. During the war, Berend also occupied Blekinge from Denmark during an unsuccessful invasion of Scania. After the abandonment of Kalmar by Søren Norby, which controlled Öland among the waters around Småland, control of it was given to Berend.

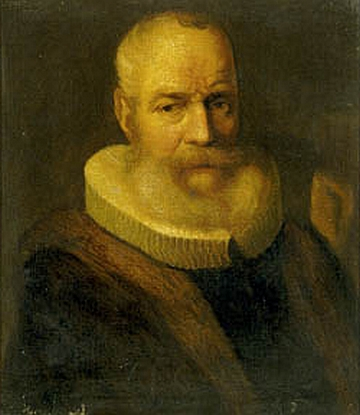
Anonymous painting of Søren Norby from 1525

Amid the Swedish invasion of Gotland in 1524, which was led by Berend, he had accepted a dinner invitation in Visby from Søren Norby who ruled the island. This came after Berend came to the conclusion that he could not take the city. When Gustav Vasa, now King, had heard of the incident, he labeled Berend a traitor. As a result, Berend was summoned to Stockholm. He requested safe passage, which was granted, but he was nonetheless arrested and imprisoned upon his arrival.

== Siege ==
Immediately after arresting Berend, Gustav Vasa sent a large number of troops and ships to capture Kalmar Castle totaling several thousand men. The Swedish troops were allowed into the town itself by the burghers. Earlier, Berend had transferred control of the castle to his brother, Henrik von Melen. When Henrik realized what had happened, he refused to let the king’s troops in, saying that only Berend and he had the right to open the gates to the castle. In a show of strength, Gustav Vasa ordered his cavalry to circle around the city to see how the garrison would react. During the maneuver, Arvid Västgöte along with four courtiers were shot from the castle in an attempt to harm the king.

As the garrison would only open the castle gates to Berend, Gustav Vasa sent him to Kalmar, escorted by Nils Eriksson and Jon Olofsson. However, he managed to escape from them into Kalmar Castle after they had become drunk. Other accounts claim he was allowed to enter the castle freely under an oath to surrender it the following morning.

That night, Berend sent a message to Öland, where he received four rote knights to swear an oath that they would not surrender the castle and would fight for him. After this, he began preparing an escape from the castle. However, during the attempt, the knights forcibly brought him back.

Immediately after they had brought Berend back, the garrison launched a sortie into the town on Whitsun Eve, where they caught the townspeople in their sleep. Nils Eriksson barely escaped an attack on the house he was staying at, and all of his valuables were brought back to the castle. Fourteen citizens were killed and several others were taken prisoner.

=== Storming ===
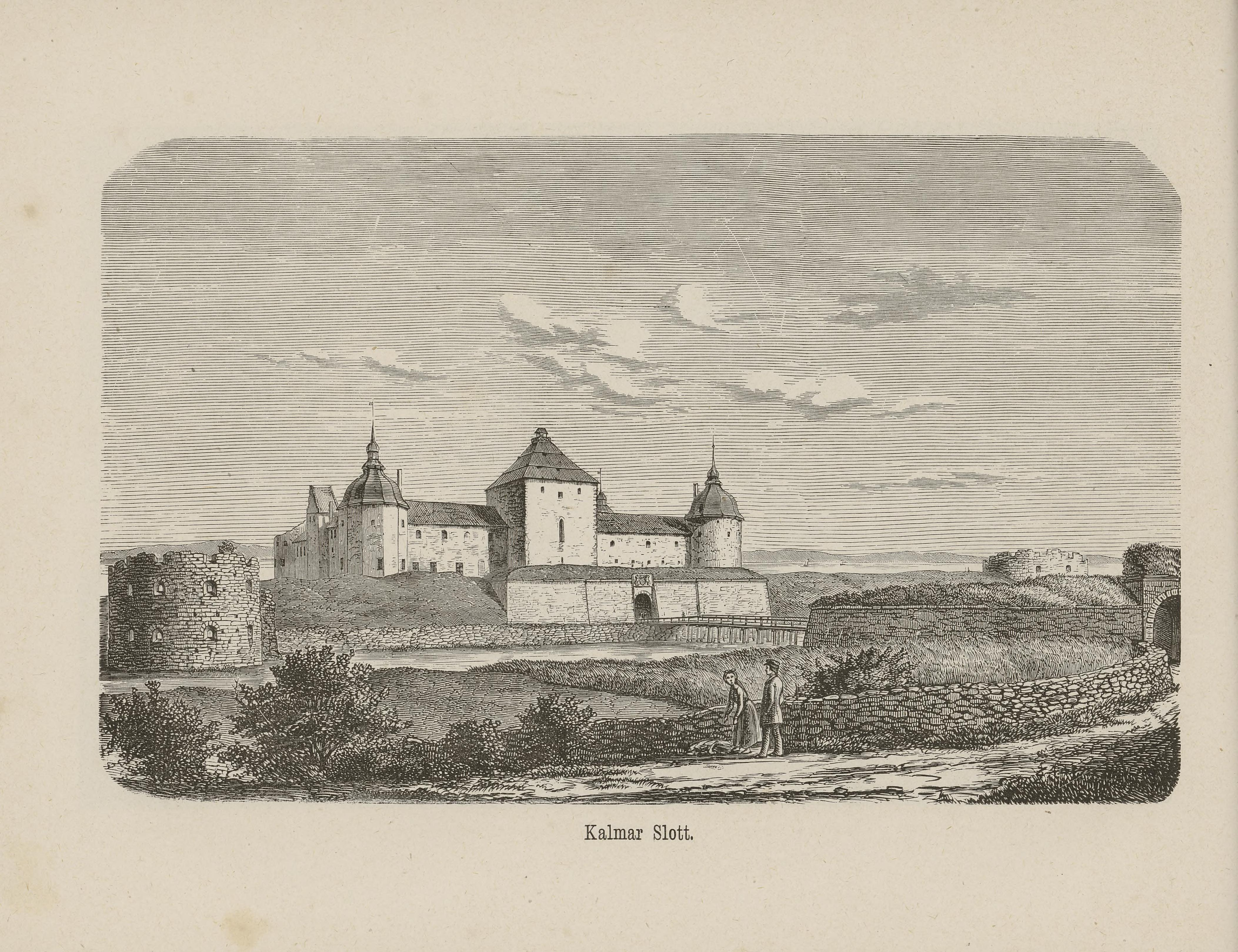
Anonymous depiction of Kalmar Castle from 1865

In early July, the garrison was yet again ordered to surrender the castle. They further declared they recognized no lord other than Berend and would defend it to the death. The castle itself had a strong ring wall, and a moat which separated it from the town. Between the moat and the town, there was an open field where Gustav Vasa built earthworks for his artillery. He planned first to bombard the castle walls to open a breach, through which the troops could storm the castle.

As soon as a large enough breach had been opened, the Swedish troops executed their assault against the castle. To divide the defenders, they also launched assaults along the entire wall. However, the garrison, around 50 men in total resisted, with both men and women participating. According to Gustav Vasa's own account, the defenders attacked the assaulting Swedes with boiling water, burning pitch wreaths, among other things. Due to heavy casualties, the Swedes were forced to retreat. Enraged, Gustav Vasa removed his royal cloak and donned a suit of armor, swearing to participate in the storming directly. However, he was persuaded not to by his troops. The troops swore to assault the castle once more, but before doing so, they began bombarding the castle again. After a large part of the wall had been destroyed, they stormed again. Peder Fredag advanced with his fähnlein, or according to other sources, four companies. Jon Pederson Ulfsax followed with 400 men, who threw themselves at the wall. After a long struggle, the Swedes scaled the wall, advancing towards the outer courtyard. However, in the courtyard, the defenders had dug a deep trench where they managed to stop the assault. Even with multiple attempts to cross it, the Swedes were repelled, suffering heavy losses. Peder Fredag's men fought fiercely, leading to him and them falling in battle. However, other sources claim a single man survived. Jon Pederson remained on the battlefield with only four men left, being called back by the king.

Owing to the heavy casualties, Gustav Vasa reportedly wept. Even then, the besieged garrison had also suffered heavy casualties, with around half dying with others being seriously wounded, and was unable to persist for long. In the morning after the second assault, the remaining garrison offered to capitulate, probably including terms of safe passage. This was refused by the king, who declared that he would "drag them out by the hair" due to the heavy casualties they had inflicted. Due to their oath to Berend expiring, with no hope of relief, the garrison was forced to capitulate on 20 July 1525 after the Swedish artillery continued its bombardments.

== Aftermath ==
After the Swedish troops entered the castle, they discovered that Henrik, Berend, and his wife Margareta had escaped to Søren Norby on 9 June. However, two people of interest were captured in the aftermath, one of Søren Norby's daughters, and Nils Stensson Sture. They were taken away while the castle's garrison was likely executed en-masse, with estimates from 60 to 76 people in what has been called a massacre or a bloodbath.

== See also ==
- Siege of Stegeborg (1543) – Peasant siege of Stegeborg during the Dacke War
- Siege of Kalmar – 1611 siege

== Works cited ==
- Larsson, Lars-Olof [in Swedish] (2002). Gustav Vasa: Landsfader eller tyrann? [Gustav Vasa: Father of the Nation or Tyrant?] (in Swedish). Norstedts. ISBN 9789151839042.
- Adolfsson, Mats (2007). Fogdemakt och bondevrede 1500 - 1718 [Bailiff power and peasant anger 1500 - 1718] (in Swedish). Natur & Kultur. ISBN 9789127356900.
- Alin, Oscar (1878). Sveriges nydaningstid, från år 1521 till år 1611 [Sweden's Renaissance, from 1521 to 1611]. Sveriges historia från äldsta tid till våra dagar (in Swedish). Vol. 3. Stockholm: Hjalmar Linnströms förlag.
- Starbäck, Carl Georg [in Swedish]; Bäckström, Per Olof [in Swedish] (1885). Gustaf Wasa och hans söner [Gustav Vasa and his sons]. Berättelser ur svenska historien (in Swedish). Vol. 3. Stockholm: F. & G. Beijers Förlag.
- Sylvander, Gustaf Volmer [in Swedish] (1870). Konung Gustafs Riksstyrelse [King Gustaf's Royal Government]. Kalmar slotts och stads historia (in Swedish). Vol. 2. Kalmar: Westinska tryckeriet.
