= Conquest of Uppsala =

1521 battle of the Swedish War of Liberation

- Part of Swedish War of Liberation
Date	19 May 1521
Location	Uppsala, Sweden 59°51′29″N 17°38′41″E
Result	Swedish victory
Territorial changes	Uppsala captured by Swedish rebels

Belligerents
Sweden	Denmark

Commanders and leaders
Jöns Olofsson †; Lars Eriksson	Bengt Bjugg

The Conquest of Uppsala (Swedish: Erövringen av Uppsala) was a part of the Swedish War of Liberation that took place on 19 May 1521. After defeating a Danish counter-attack outside Västerås, Vasa sent two of his military commanders, Jöns Olofsson and Lars Eriksson, to take control of the eastern province of Uppland. After passing through the hundreds of Simtuna and Torstuna, Jöns Olofsson was met by local Danish commander Bengt Bjugg and his forces, who defeated the rebels and killed Olofsson.

Lars Eriksson had by then reached Enköping, where he met Bjugg, and forced his troops on a retreat to Uppsala. The Danes had yet no clear view of the rebellion's full scope, and did not believe that Uppsala would be attacked any time soon. The Swedish peasant army attacked on the night between the 18th and 19 May, after the mass of Eric the Saint had been celebrated in the city, catching the Danish forces by surprise. The archbishop's residence was attacked and soon taken. Bengt Bjugg managed to escape to Stockholm, but within soon died of an infected arrow wound.

The peasant army's victory was only temporary. Shortly after Gustav Vasa left his camp outside Västerås and headed to Uppsala, three weeks after the city's conquest, the local archbishop attacked, forcing Gustav to flee. He was almost captured by the pursuing enemy by Läby ford. However, he managed to rally more troops and by the time of Midsummer the same year he had pushed back the Danish governmental forces.
