= Didrik Slagheck =

Roman Catholic archbishop

The Most Reverend Didrik Slagheck
- Archbishop of Lund
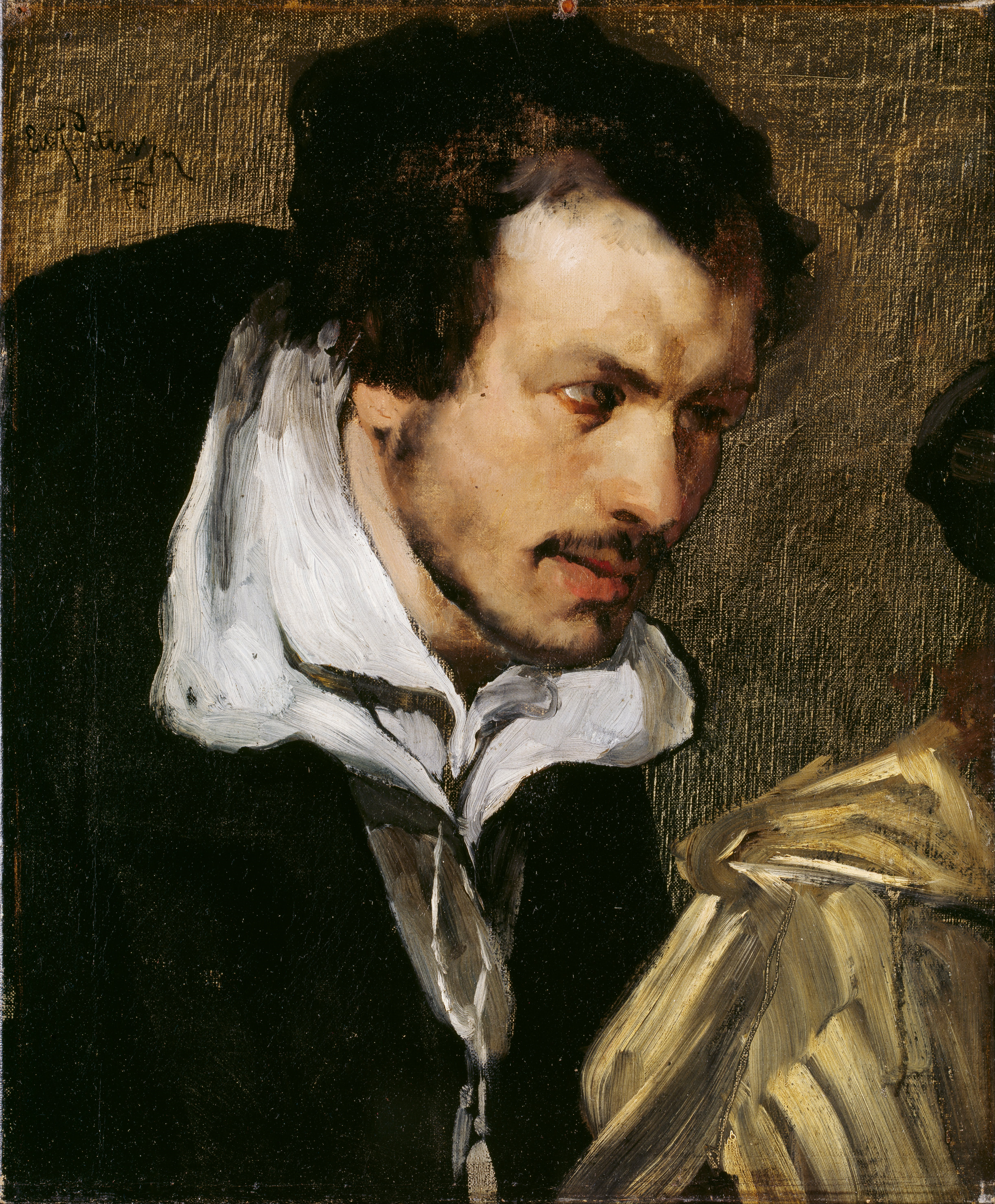
- Church: Roman Catholic
- Diocese: Diocese of Skara (1520–1521); Archdiocese of Lund (1521–1522)
- Predecessor: Vincent Henningsson (Skara); Jørgen Skodborg (Lund)
- Successor: Francesco de Potenza (Skara); Johan Weze (Lund)

Personal details
- Died: 24 January 1522; Copenhagen

Didrik Slagheck (died 24 January 1522) was a Danish archbishop, military commander during the Swedish War of Liberation, and often pointed out as an active participant in the Stockholm Bloodbath.

Slagheck was the illegitimate son of a Westphalian priest and appears to have been working in the papal office during his early life. He arrived in Norway in 1510 and soon received appreciation for his service from both Christian II of Denmark and his advisor, Sigbrit Willoms. After some time abroad he returned to Scandinavia in 1517, as assistant to the papal representative Arcimboldi. Arcimboldus is said to have received bribes from Sten Sture the Younger, regent of Sweden, something which Slagheck reported to the king. He was soon sent to Rome to report about Arcimboldus' activities.

In 1520 Slagheck followed Christian II to Stockholm and is said to have helped inspire the Stockholm Bloodbath. He was soon appointed to the position as bishop of Skara, as the previous bishop Vincent Henningsson had been executed. He became one of the three Danish leaders left behind to govern Sweden when Christian II returned to Denmark, soon making himself unpopular among the population. Slagheck participated as a military commander during the early stages of the rebellion led by Gustav Vasa, leading the Danish forces during the Battle of Västerås.

He was recalled to Denmark later in 1521, where he was given the position of archbishop of Lund. He would not keep this position for long, as Pope Leo X had been greatly discontented when he received word of the execution of two bishops in the Stockholm Bloodbath, prompting Christian II to put the entire blame on Slagheck. He was sentenced to death by hanging, which was changed in the last minute to death by burning, which took place in Copenhagen on 24 January 1522.

== Sources ==
- Svensk Uppslagsbok
- Nationalencyklopedin
