= Battle of Västerås =

1521 battle of the Swedish War of Liberation

- Part of Swedish War of Liberation
Date	April 29, 1521
Location	Badelundaåsen and Västerås, Sweden 59°38′N 16°37′E
Result	Swedish victory
Territorial changes	Västerås captured by Gustav Vasa

Belligerents
Sweden	Kalmar Union: Denmark

Commanders and leaders
Gustav Vasa	Didrik Slagheck

Strength
~15,000	

The Battle of Västerås (Swedish: Slaget om Västerås) was a battle in the Swedish War of Liberation that took place on Badelundaåsen, northeast of Västerås, Sweden on April 29, 1521. The Swedish troops, led by Gustav Vasa, defeated the Danish force, led by Didrik Slagheck, and conquered Västerås.

Gustav Vasa, who after going to Gästrikland and attempting to rally support for his rebellion, returned to Dalarna in early April and was informed of the victory in the Battle of Brunnbäck Ferry. He decided to continue onwards to Västerås. His troops had on April 23 made camp by Romfartuna Church, where the army was mustered. On April 28 they broke up and marched to Västerås, not knowing that a peasant army attempting to take the city Köping two days earlier had been defeated by the forces of Dridrik Slagheck, who had now arrived in Västerås. Gustav Vasa arrived on April 29 and began preparing a siege. They were spotted by Slagheck's troops and attacked, but managed to force the attackers into retreat.

No major victory was won and the Danish forces remained in the city for a month, making more, if failed, sorties against the besieging Swedish troops. On May 20 the Danish left the city, leaving only a small force in Västerås Castle and shipping away the other troops. The castle held out until January 30, 1522, when attempts to aid the garrison by sea from Stockholm failed.
