= Badelundaåsen =

Esker in Sweden

Coordinates: 59°38′N 16°37′E

Badelundaåsen (English: Badelunda ridge) is a long and large esker in central Sweden. It runs from the region of Nyköping in Södermanland to lake Siljan in Dalarna, and is known for many ancient monuments, especially near Badelunda outside of Västerås.

The ancient road from the Mälaren Valley to Norrland and Norway followed Badelundaåsen in long stretches. At Brunnbäck, south of Avesta, and at Grådö, south of Hedemora, the Badelund esker and the Dalälven river intersect. The esker and the river have been, historically, the most important travel routes to northern Dalarna. Due to the strategic importance of the intersection, a medieval fortification Grådö skans was built, itself a precursor to Borganäs in Borlänge.

On March 29, 1520, during the Dano-Swedish War of 1512–1520, a Danish army defeated rebelling Swedes at the battle of Badelundaåsen. More than a year later, on April 29, 1521, the battle of Västerås took place at Badelundaåsen east of Västerås, after which Gustav Vasa took control of Västerås from Danish control.
