= Conquest of Kalmar =

1523 battle of the Swedish War of Liberation

- Part of Swedish War of Liberation
Date	27 May 1523
Location	Kalmar, Sweden 56°39′41″N 16°21′46″E
Result	Swedish victory
Territorial changes	Kalmar captured by Swedish forces

Belligerents
Sweden	Kalmar Union: Denmark

Commanders and leaders
Arvid Västgöte; Peder Hansson	Unknown

Strength
At least two Fähnlein of German mercenaries	Unknown

The Conquest of Kalmar (Swedish: Erövringen av Kalmar) took place on 27 May 1523, during the Swedish War of Liberation (1521-1523). In the beginning of 1523, Kalmar and Stockholm remained as the only real Danish strongholds in Sweden. The situation in Kalmar was tense, with many German Landsknechte mercenaries in Danish hire stationed in the city. They were under orders that, if the city were to be attacked, they should kill all burghers of Swedish origin, burn the city and castle, retreat, and regroup in Visby, Gotland.

When this order became known in the city, the inhabitants quickly made contact with the commanders of the besieging Swedish forces, Arvid Västgöte and Peder Hansson. An agreement was made that the burghers would leave the northern city gate open on the night before 27 May. This was done, and the attack began. Before dawn, the city was in Swedish hands. Eight days later Kalmar Castle surrendered as well, and Arvid Västgöte continued on to cleanse Öland of Danish troops.

== See also ==
- Siege of Kalmar 1525
