= War in Gotland (1524) =

Swedish expedition to Gotland in 1524

- Part of the Swedish War of Liberation
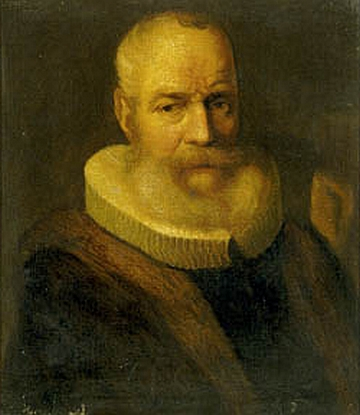
- Søren Norby
Date	20 May – Early October 1524
Location	Gotland
Result	See result
Territorial changes	Status quo ante bellum

Belligerents
Sweden; Lübeck; Supported by Hanseatic League	Søren Norby's forces

Commanders and leaders
(Sweden) Berend von Melen (Sweden) Ivar Fleming (POW)	Søren Norby

Units involved
Two squadrons	Visborg garrison Sassen; Kravelen

Strength
2,000–8,000 men 2 squadrons 3 Fire ships 6 guns First squadron Unknown amount of ships Second squadron 11 ships (Note: Only five of the 11 ships arrived, since six had been captured by Søren Norby's fleet)	Unknown amount of men ~10 ships (Note: See Søren's forces); Several guns

Casualties and losses
6 ships captured Several ships damaged by fire	Negligible

The War in Gotland (1524) also called the Gotland expedition (Swedish: Gotlandsexpeditionen) was a Swedish invasion of Gotland led by Berend von Melen against Gotland which was controlled by Søren Norby during the Swedish War of Liberation. The Swedes left the island in early October after peace was signed with Denmark at the Malmö Recess

== Background ==
Christian II and Frederick I

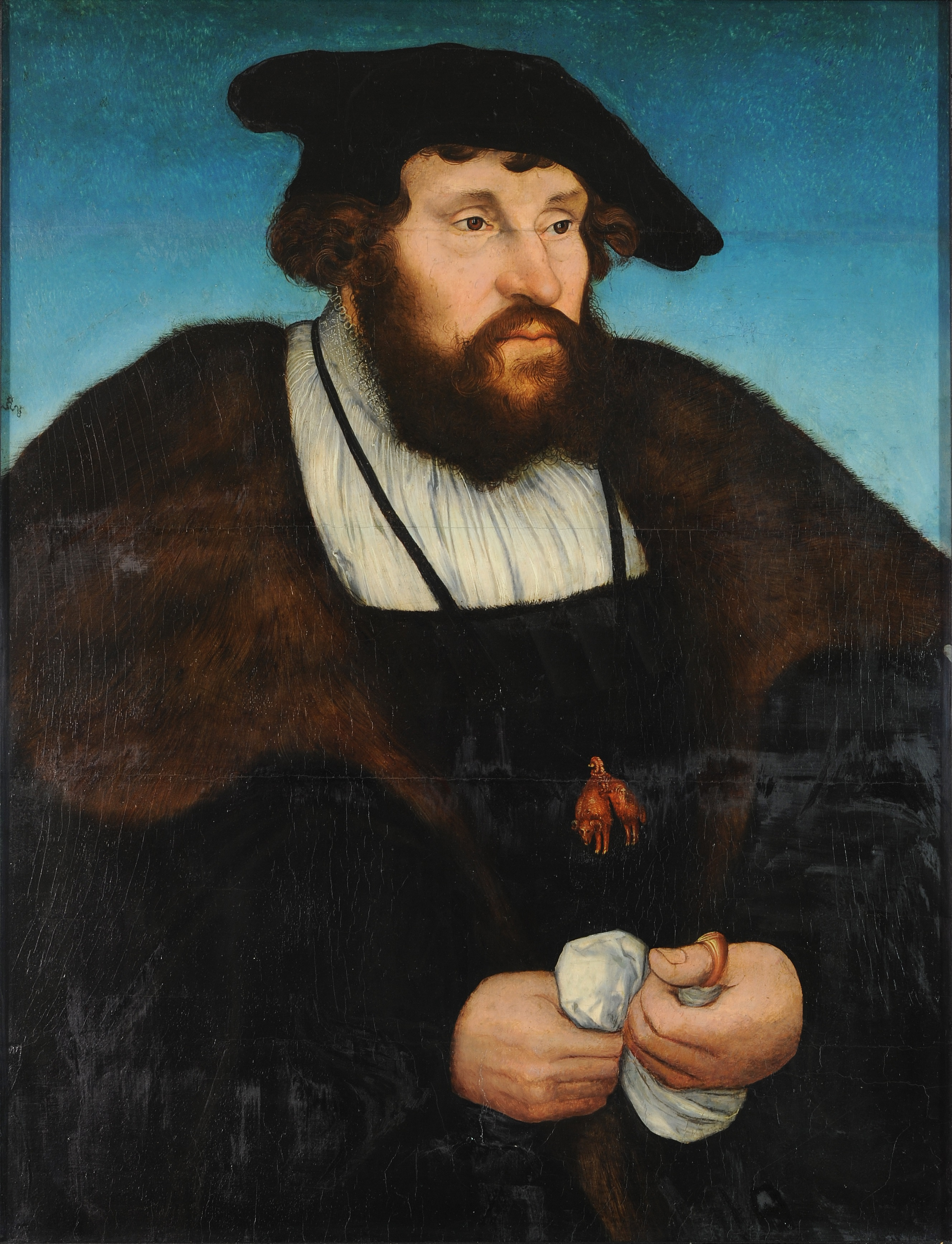
King Christian II of Denmark (1513 – 23)

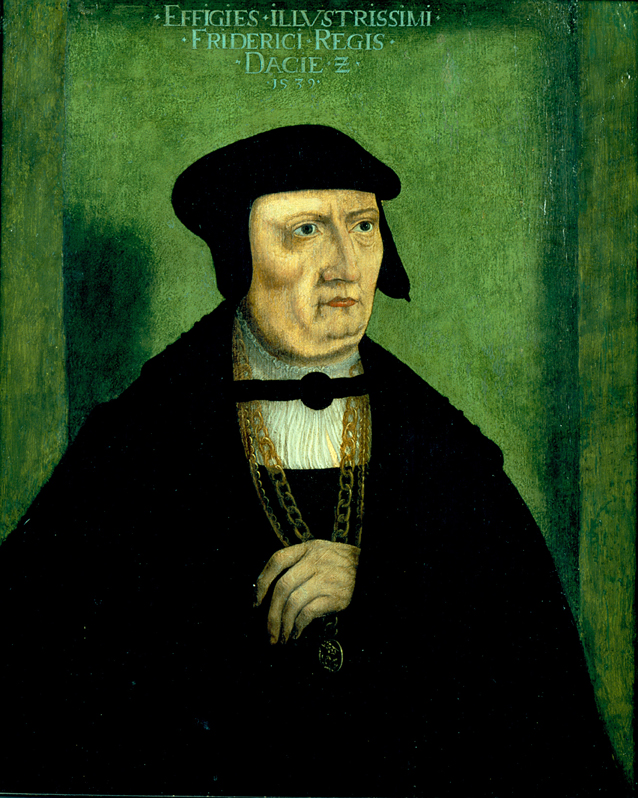
King Frederick I of Denmark (1523 – 33)

In 1524, the fighting between Denmark and Sweden during the Swedish War of Liberation had mostly died down, although the Swedes had one enemy left, this being Søren Norby who controlled Gotland. He had previously been named lord of Gotland by Christian II, however, after he was deposed, Søren refused to pledge allegiance to the new Danish king, Frederick I.

Norby had been engaging in piracy around the Baltic ever since he received the island in 1517, his ships fought against every ship that passed Gotland, which disrupted the activities of the Hansa. Despite his deposition, Søren kept in communication with Christian II.

Vadstena

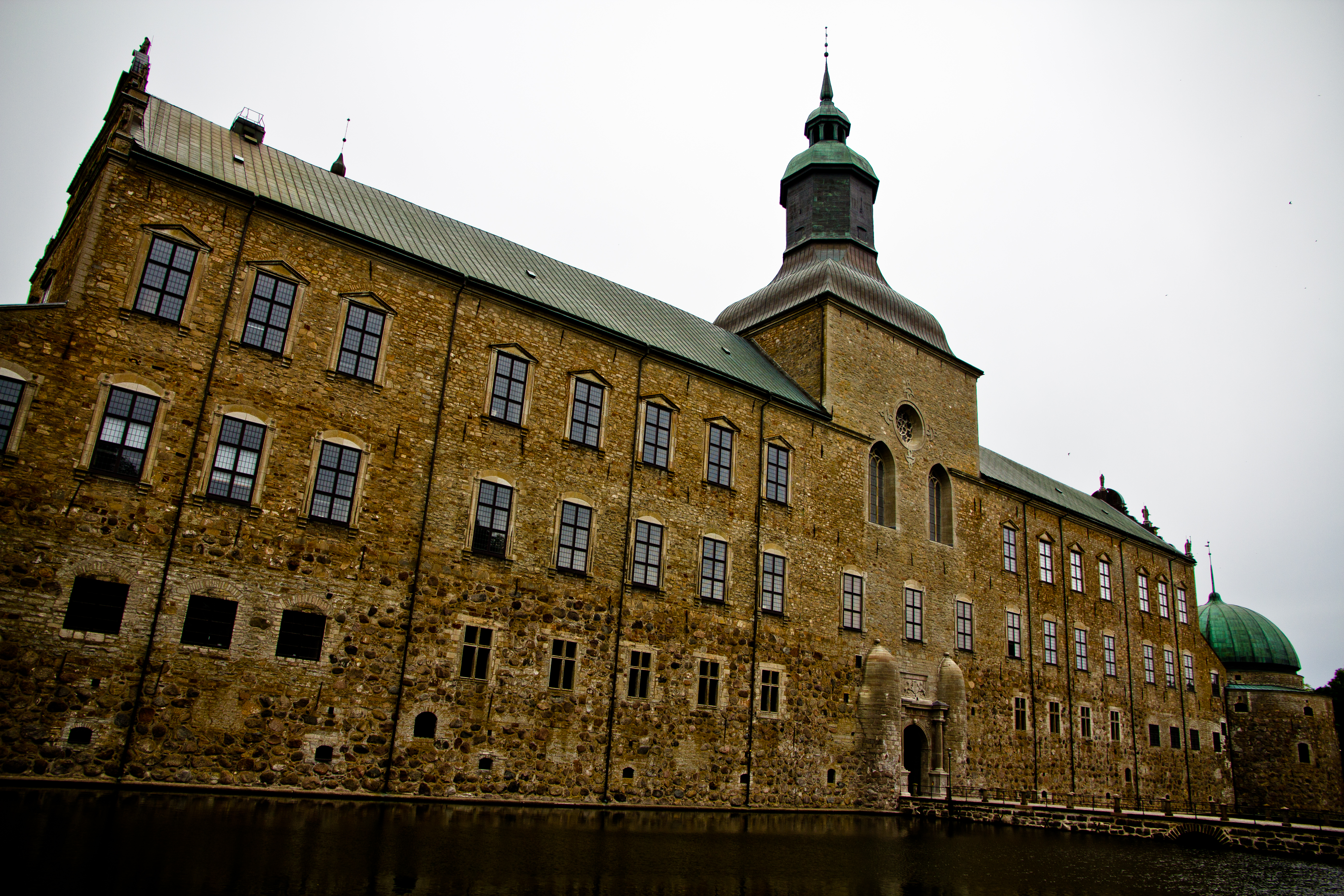
Frontside of the Vadstena castle, where the meeting took place

=== Meeting at Vadstena ===
The Meeting at Vadstena decided to send Swedish troops to conquer Gotland from Søren, with Berend being designated as the leader of this campaign. This campaign was also heavily encouraged by Lübeck, since they were being heavily affected by Søren's piracy. The Swedes and Lübeckians were also supported by the Hanseatic League.

=== Søren's forces ===
The maritime forces commanded by Søren were quite significant, he had at his disposal the following:

- One ship Carvel built with 18 guns
- Nine smaller ships with a combined 24 guns

His fleet consisted of both warships and more or less armed merchantmen, most of which were likely captured in raids. One such ship was the Sassen, which was captured in 1521 from the Swedish-Lübeckian captain Staffan Sasse and thus named after him.

The heaviest ship in Søren's fleet was the Kravelen, which possibly has its origins from Finland in 1523.

== War ==
=== Beginning ===
On 14 May, a Swedish squadron sailed from Kalmar, it had Bered von Melen, who was a German mercenary in Gustav Vasa's service and the commander of the Swedish forces. On board the Swedish ships, there were 2,000-8,000 Swedish, Finnish, and German men. Despite the expedition being quickly reported to Søren by scouts, he was not able to stop the Swedes and they landed at Västergarn on 20 May, around 2.6 miles away from Visby. The Swedes also landed at Kronvalls, Östergarn, and Hall

Søren's forces retreated behind the walls of Visborg and left the rest of the island to the Swedes, at the same time, another Swedish squadron of around 11 ships commanded by Ivar Fleming was dispatched from Stockholm with siege artillery and ammunition. After Søren's forces had retreated, the Swedes were able to easily capture the entire countryside. Berend had previously forgotten to block the harbor in Visby, which allowed Søren to send out some of his ships to attack the Swedish squadron. The result being that not more than six Swedish ships were captured along with its commander, Ivar Fleming before they managed to reach Gotland, after which they were brought into Visby.

Visborg

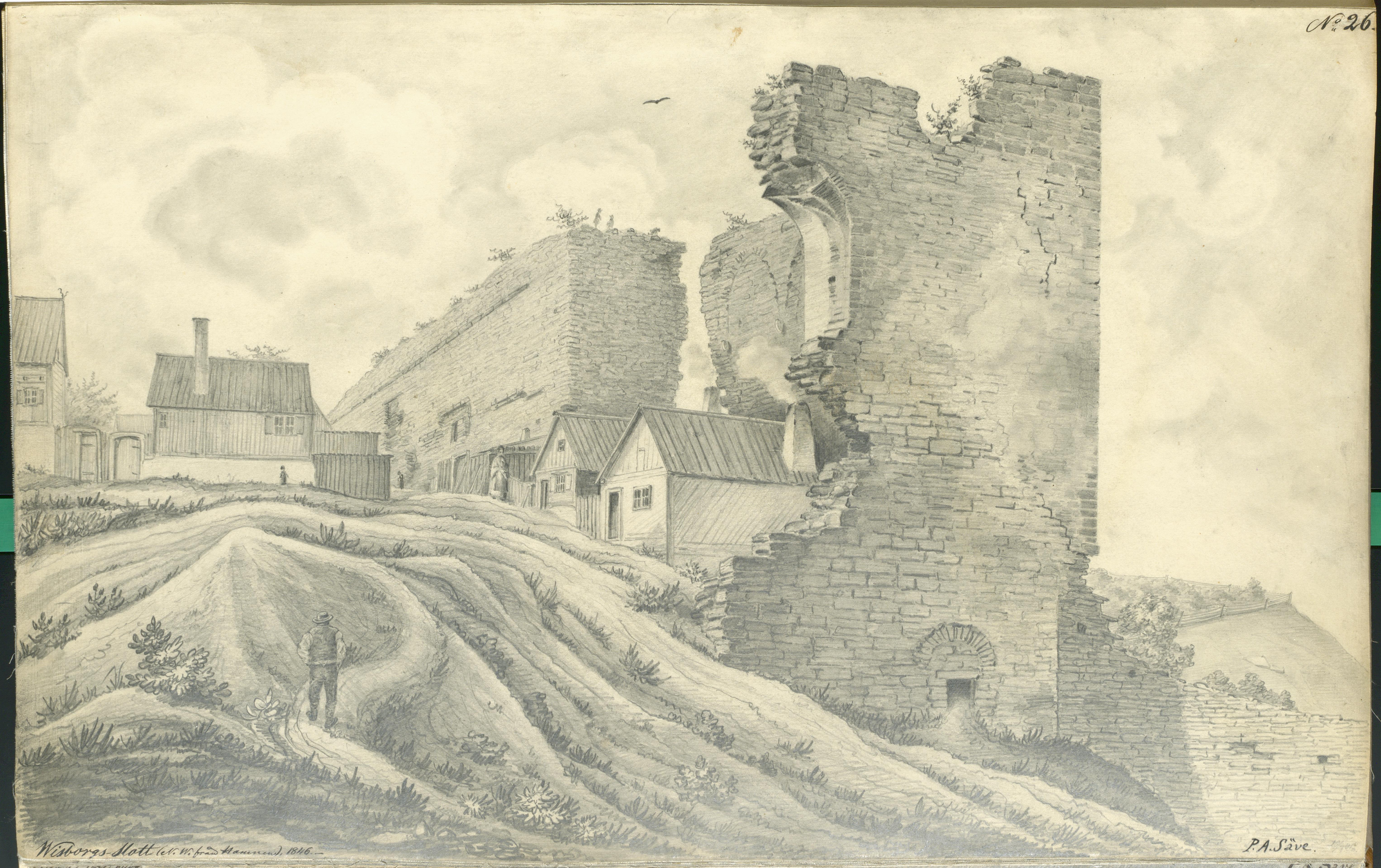
Drawing of Visborg castle by Per Arvid Säve from 1846

=== Siege of Visborg ===
The Swedes later attempted to assault Visborg from the sea, but these attempts ended in failure. Three Swedish Fire ships were sent into Visby harbor, but they were instead led by the wind into the rest of the Swedish fleet, igniting several of them. The artillery inside the fortress also sank more Swedish ships, and during a sortie from the defenders they managed to burn part of the Swedish camp. The Swedish siege artillery lacked ammunition, which led to the Swedes being stopped at Visby. After a long siege, the German mercenaries besieging Visborg began to mutiny out of anger from their wages not being paid on time. Gustav Vasa was also informed that Berend had gone over to Søren's side since they had been old friends.

=== Søren's report ===
During the Swedish expedition to Gotland, Søren wrote the following report:

"Så hände äfven att till Gotland skickade bondekonungen i Sverige hela Sveriges magt, de lübske och de sjuttio hansestäderna och deras anhang till hjelp, och voro der medförde från Stockholm sex karthauer (stora kanoner) och några slangor (mindre kanoner) och mycket annat skytte, hvarmed äfven följde en hel flotta, lastad med krut, lod och proviant att därmed förse lägret och beskjuta slottet. Utsände jag då nattetid några mina örlogsskepp med mitt folk, som borttogo det förnämsta skeppet samt ett svenskt riksråd och öfverste amiral Ivar Fleming samt en av karthauerne med mycket annat skytte och deribland femtonhundra kulor till karthauer och slangor äfvensom fem skepp lastade med proviant och annat gods.

När de nu andra dagen skulle föra deras skytte i land till lägret, karthauer och slangor, befanns det, att det var jag, som hade kulorna därtill."

"då lät jag nattetid göra larm i det svenska lägret, och blef större delen av folket nedergjort, lägret uppbrändt och befälet och översten för dem tillfångatagne och med mig förde upp till slottet."

— Søren Norby

Rough translation:

"So it also happened that to Gotland the peasant king in Sweden sent all the power of Sweden, the Lübsk and the seventy Hanseatic cities and their followers for help, and there were brought from Stockholm six Carthaginians (large cannons) and some hoses (smaller cannons) and much other shooting, with which also followed a whole fleet, loaded with gunpowder, lead and provisions to supply the camp and shell the castle. I then sent out at night some of my warships with my people, who took away the noblest ship and a Swedish councilor and Colonel Admiral Ivar Fleming and one of the Carthaginians with much other shooting and including fifteen hundred bullets for the Carthaginians and hoses also five ships loaded with provisions and other goods."

Now on the second day, when they were going to bring their shooting ashore to the camp, carthaus and slings, it was found that it was I who had the balls for it."

"then I caused an alarm to be made in the Swedish camp at night, and the greater part of the people were destroyed, the camp burned and the commander and colonel of them captured and brought up to the castle with me."

— Søren Norby

After being disappointed with the Lübeckians, and the poor distribution, Gustav Vasa decided to end his participation in the war on Gotland, and pulled back the Swedish troops.

== Aftermath ==
At the same time the expedition was ongoing, an intensive diplomatic game was going on between Denmark and Sweden. During these, Denmark managed to secure control over Gotland once again, and the Swedish expedition troops were to leave the island.

== Result ==
Despite the invasion being a failure for the Swedes, the conflict can not be considered a victory for either side.
