= Lasse Olsson =

Warman

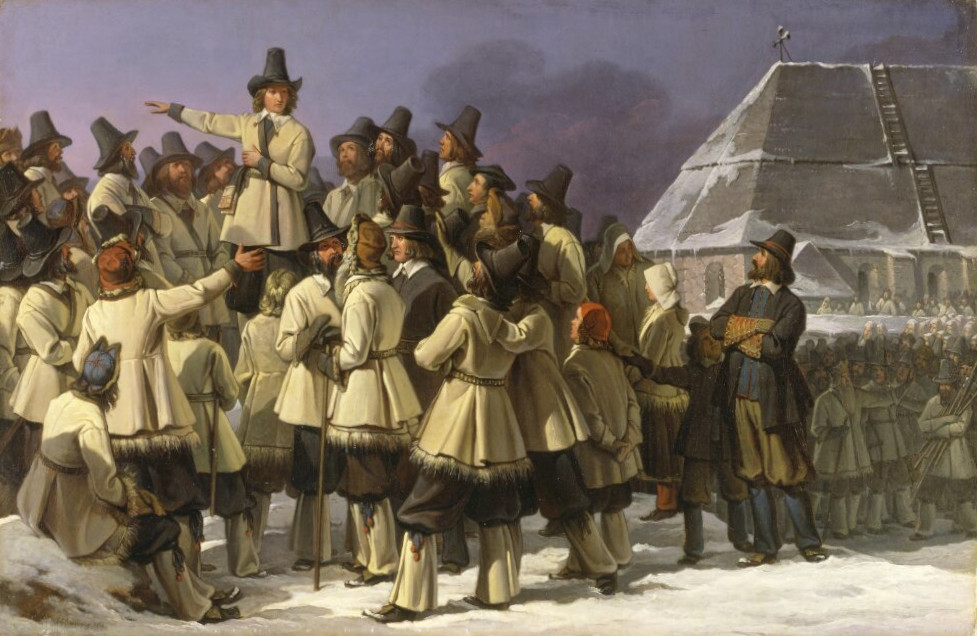
On a Johan Gustaf Sandberg painting from 1836

Lasse Olsson (died probably 1572) was Gustav Eriksson's (House of Vasa) lead warman and key figure in the war of liberation from the Union King Christian II in 1520–1521. He then had several roles within the royal circle in Västerbotten, Hälsingland, Norrland and Östergötland. Between 1561 and 1568 he was a member of the royal High board. Olsson was born in Östergötland but was not born into the aristocracy. Two of his sons were later noblemen.
