= Treaty of Malmö =

1524 treaty between Denmark and Sweden

The Treaty of Malmö (Swedish: Malmö recess) was an agreement between Frederick I of Denmark–Norway and Gustav Vasa of Sweden, signed on 1 September 1524, after the Swedish War of Liberation. The negotiations were mediated by Lübeck.

At the beginning of the negotiations, Frederick I raised the issue of re-establishing the Kalmar Union, but this was sharply rejected by Gustav Vasa and the question was not revisited later.

The terms of the treaty were such that Denmark was to keep Blekinge and the Swedish troops were to hold Ranrike (Viken) until the issue was resolved. By 1532, no agreement had been reached, and Ranrike was returned to Denmark–Norway in exchange for 1,200 guilders.

The question of Gotland was set aside and was to be decided by a committee of representatives from various Hanseatic cities in Lübeck at Pentecost the following year. Until then, both Gustav Vasa's and Søren Norby's troops were to leave Gotland, and the island would remain with the party that held control over the fortress of Visborg on 1 September. As Norby remained in control of Visborg, and thus the island was to be controlled by Denmark.

Gustav Vasa, who was heavily indebted to Lübeck, was deeply disappointed with outcome of the negotiations. The Treaty of Malmö is regarded as a turning point in Lübeck's relationship with Sweden, as Gustav thereafter sought to reduce the Hanseatic influence in Sweden. Shared hostility towards Lübeck, combined with concerns over a possible return of Christian II, also contributed to a rapprochement between Sweden and Denmark.

== See also ==
- List of treaties

== Other sources ==
- Gary Dean Peterson (2014) Warrior Kings of Sweden: The Rise of an Empire in the Sixteenth and Seventeenth Centuries (McFarland) ISBN 9781476604114
