= Swedish War of Liberation =

1521–1523 Swedish rebellion against King Christian II

- Part of the Kalmar Union wars of the 16th century
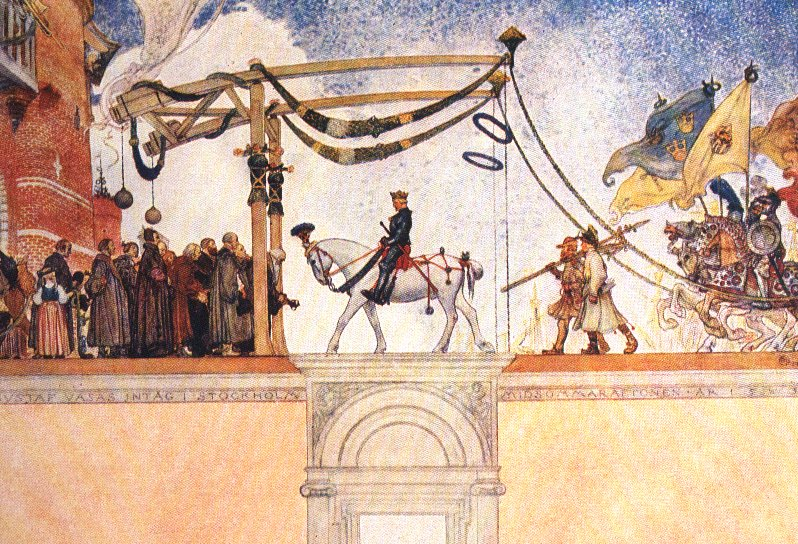
- The Entry of Gustav Vasa into Stockholm; Carl Larsson, oil on canvas, 1908
Date	1521–23
Location	Scandinavia
Result	Swedish victory; Treaty of Malmö
Territorial changes	Kingdom of Sweden regains independence; Dissolution of the Kalmar Union

Belligerents
Sweden; Free City of Lübeck (from 1522)	Kalmar Union: Denmark; Norway

Commanders and leaders
(Sweden) Gustav Vasa; (Sweden) Christina Gyllenstierna; (Sweden) Anna Eriksdotter; (Free City of Lübeck) Fredrich Bruun	(Kalmar Union) King Christian II (Note: Deposed in 1523); (Kalmar Union) King Frederick I; (Kalmar Union) Admiral Henrich Krummedige; (Kalmar Union) Archbishop Olav Engelbrektsson; (Kalmar Union) Lord General Nils Henriksson

Strength
12,000	27,000

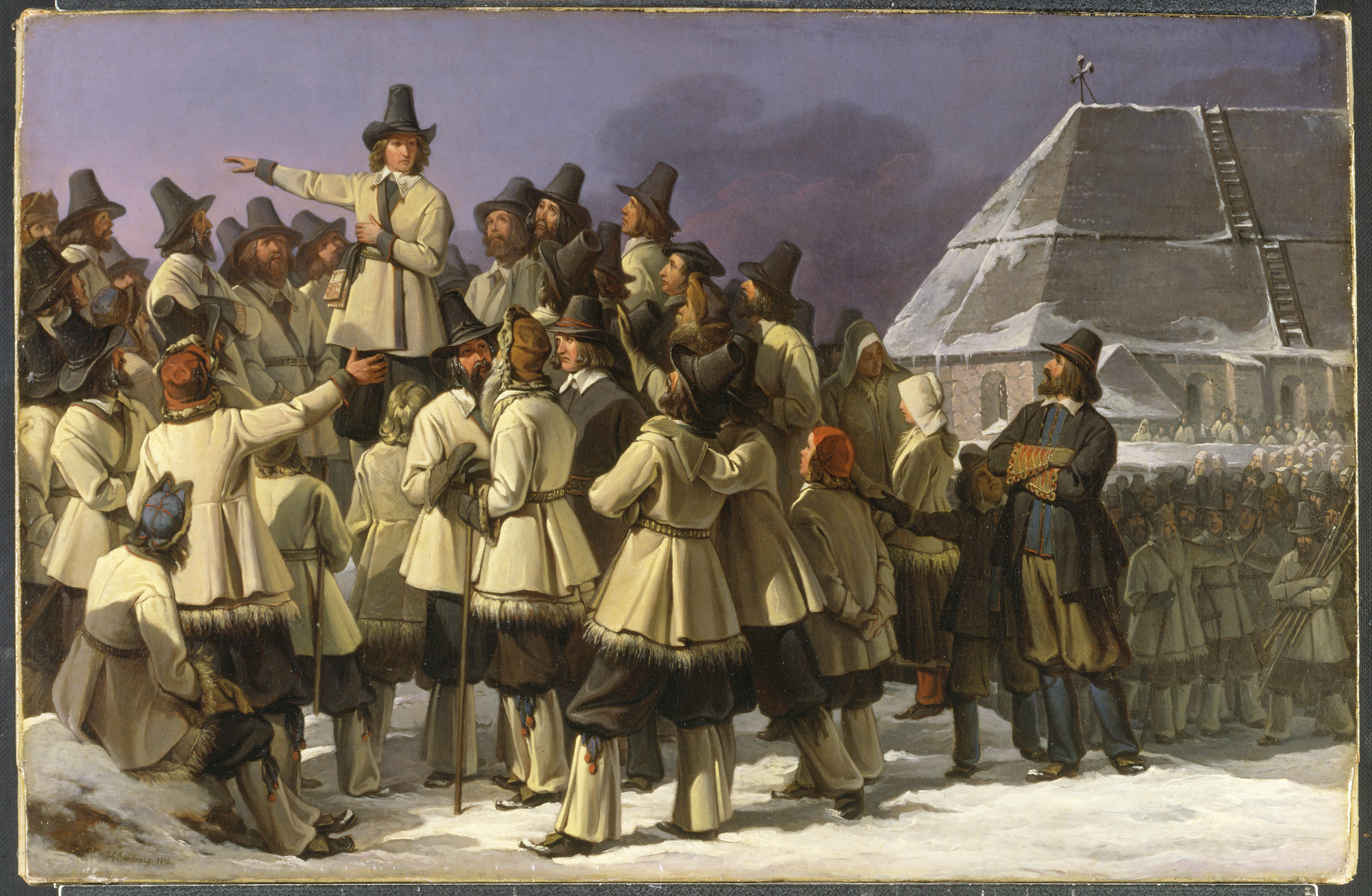
Gustav Vasa addressing the Dalecarlians in Mora,Johan Gustaf Sandberg, oil on canvas, 1836.

The Swedish War of Liberation (1521–1523; Swedish: Befrielsekriget, lit. 'The Liberation War'), also known as Gustav Vasa's Rebellion and the Swedish War of Secession, was a significant historical event in Sweden. Gustav Vasa, a nobleman, led a rebellion and civil war against King Christian II. The war resulted in the deposition of King Christian II from the throne of Sweden, effectively ending the Kalmar Union that had united Sweden, Norway, and Denmark.

== Background ==
King Christian II, along with his ally, Swedish Archbishop Gustav Trolle, attempted to suppress the separatist Sture party within the Swedish nobility by executing numerous members during the Stockholm Bloodbath. The King faced discontent due to his imposition of high taxes on the peasantry. Furthermore, the presence of German and Danish nobles and commoners in most Swedish castles further fueled the anger of native Swedish nobility.

=== Economics ===
In the background was an economic power struggle over the mining and metal industry in Bergslagen, Sweden's main mining region in the 16th century. This struggle exacerbated existing conflicts over the Kalmar Union.

A key player in this economic competition was Jakob Fugger, a wealthy industrialist in the mining and metal industries on the continent, who sought to gain control over the industry in Bergslagen. He formed alliances with Pope Leo X and the Swedish Archbishop Gustav Trolle, both of whom depended on him economically, as well as with the Holy Roman Emperor Maximilian I and Christian II of Denmark/Norway, who asserted his claim to the throne of the Union, including Sweden. Christian's marriage to Isabella of Austria in 1515 strengthened this alliance.

Another key player was the Hanseatic League, represented by the Free City of Lübeck, which had a virtual monopoly on trade with Sweden and Bergslagen. The League was allied with the Swedish regents Sten Sture the Younger and later Gustav Vasa, who at times were strongly dependent of the League.

== Rebellion 1521 ==
The war began in January 1521, when Gustav Vasa was appointed hövitsman (commander) over Dalarna by representatives of the people in the northern part of the province. After Gustav Vasa captured the copper mine at Stora Kopparberget and the town of Västerås, more men joined his army. In 1522, the Hanseatic city of Lübeck formed an alliance with the Swedish rebels. After the capture of Stockholm in June 1523, the rebels effectively ruled Sweden, and on 6 June, Gustav Vasa was elected King of Sweden in the town of Strängnäs. By September, Gustav Vasa's supporters also controlled Swedish Finland. The Treaty of Malmö, signed on 1 September 1524, formalized Sweden's secession from the Kalmar Union.

Initially, Gustav's role in the war against Christian II was as one of several rebel leaders, each active in different parts of the country. The war that eventually led to his coronation was only partially instigated and led by him. The term "Gustav Vasa's War of Liberation", often used in historiography, derives primarily from the war's outcome—Gustav Vasa's ascension to the throne of an independent Sweden—rather than its initial impetus and course. Contemporary research also indicates that Gustav himself did not directly oversee any military operations, delegating such responsibilities to associates with greater military experience.

=== Dalarna ===
The details of Gustav Vasa's initial activities in Dalarna in 1520 remain largely unknown due to the scarcity of sources. The most comprehensive account available was written during Gustav's reign by his close associate, Bishop Peder Andreæ Swart of Västerås, which some historians speculate was heavily influenced by Gustav himself.

In 1520, Gustav Vasa traveled to the Swedish province of Dalarna, disguised as a peasant to avoid detection by King Christian's scouts. Arriving in the city of Mora in December, he sought the peasants' help in his uprising against Christian II. When he was rebuffed, Gustav Vasa decided to travel north in search of supporters for his cause. A couple of refugees arrived in Mora and told of the atrocities committed by Christian II and his troops. Moved by these accounts, the people of Mora decided to locate Gustav Vasa and join his rebellion, sending two skilled skiers for the task. They eventually intercepted him in Sälen. (The Vasaloppet, a 90 km (56 mi) ski race, commemorates this remarkable escape from Christian II's soldiers in the winter of 1520–1521, but follows the reverse route from Sälen back to Mora. Legend has it that he fled on skis).

Upon his return to Mora, on New Year's Eve 1521, Gustav Vasa was appointed hövitsman by emissaries from all the parishes of northern Dalarna.

In March, Gustav Vasa left Mora with about 100 men and plundered Kopparberg. Soon after, the peasants of Bergslagen rallied to the cause, swelling Gustav Vasa's forces to over 1,000 men.

=== Battle of Brunnbäck Ferry ===
When news of the Swedish uprising reached Christian II, he sent a contingent of Landknechten to put down the rebellion. In April 1521, the Union forces clashed with Gustav Vasa's followers at Brunnbäck Ferry, resulting in the decisive defeat of the King's army. This triumph greatly boosted the morale of the Swedish rebels.

An emergency mint was set up in Dalarna to produce the copper coins needed to finance the war effort.

=== Battle of Västerås ===
The rebel army advanced south to Västerås, which they captured and plundered in the Battle of Västerås (29 April 1521). Upon hearing of Gustav Vasa's triumph, supporters of the Sture family decided to join the rebellion. Västerås marked a pivotal moment in Gustav Vasa's fortunes, as the rebels gained control of the shipping routes from Bergslagen and Fugger stopped funding Christian II.

In April, Gustav Trolle had been sent to Hälsingland, but when his two hundred cavalry encountered the thousand strong peasant army, they fled south. By the end of April 1521, Gustav Vasa had secured supremacy in Dalarna, with support from Gästrikland, Västmanland, and Närke, but without the fortresses.

On 15 July 1521, the Riksdag met in Stockholm and offered Gustav Vasa a free lease on Stockholm with forgiveness for all transgressions. As a gesture of goodwill, Gustav Trolle had Didrik Slagheck imprisoned, and was promised substantial supplies of malt and hops. Gustav Vasa hesitated and waited for developments. The rebellion soon reached Brunkeberg, although the peasants found it impossible to besiege the town.

The summer of 1521 brought relative peace. Many returned to their farms to help with the harvest.

== After Västerås – professional armies ==
The importance of peasant armies diminished in the conflict, and the war was fought primarily by German mercenaries and recruited Swedish soldiers, supplemented by cavalry from the Swedish nobility.

=== 1521 – Gustav Vasa becomes head of state ===
Lars Siggesson Sparre, who had previously been a hostage of Christian II but had defected to the King's side, now sided with Gustav Vasa. Hans Brask and Ture Jönsson Tre Rosor also switched allegiance to Gustav Vasa, and in the second half of August he was recognized as the leader of Sweden by the provinces of Gotland at a meeting in Vadstena. At the same time, the government appointed by Christian II withdrew from Swedish territory.

The assembly in Vadstena in 1521, which declared Gustav as head of state, consisted of a relatively small group of prominent individuals, mainly from the southern provinces. The peasants and other supporters who had propelled him forward in the earlier stages of the uprising were not represented. In addition, most of the nobility in Östergötland, Sörmland, and Uppland remained loyal to King Christian of the Union. However, the continued expansion of the rebellion and the election of the nobleman Gustav as head of state caused many to switch sides or flee to Denmark to avoid reprisals.

=== 1522 – The Hansa joins ===
Just before Christmas in 1521, Berend von Melen, the commander of Stegeborg in Östergötland, transferred control to Gustav Eriksson, resulting in the castle's capture by the rebel army. With Berend's help, Gustav gained a valuable ally with considerable military experience and strong connections to the Hanseatic League in Lübeck.

The castles of Örebro and Västerås were besieged and taken in early 1522. However, the most important fortresses remained strong. Gustav and his allies realized that these fortresses could not be taken without warships and heavy artillery.

Negotiations began with Lübeck, which had its own interest in unimpeded trade, free from the restrictions imposed by the Danish king. In exchange for aid in the form of ships, soldiers, cannons, and other essential supplies, Lübeck was promised exemption from customs duties in Sweden. From May, Lübeck took an active part in the conflict, and in the fall it intensified the siege of the Danish strongholds of Stockholm and Kalmar. At the same time, Gustav, Berend von Melen, and Lübeck strategized an operation to conquer Skåne and other regions in eastern Denmark. A naval battle near Stockholm cut off vital supplies to the Danish garrison stationed there.

=== 1523 – Gustav Vasa becomes king ===
The campaign against Skåne was planned for January 1523, but was not carried out. Instead, Blekinge and parts of Norwegian Bohuslän were taken. In March, Christian II was deposed by a Danish uprising and Frederick I was elected King of Denmark. As a result, Lübeck's interest in cooperating with Gustav in the conquest of Scania waned, and the campaign was halted.

Kalmar fell on 27 May 1523. Gustav Eriksson (Vasa) was proclaimed King of Sweden at the Riksdag in Strängnäs on 6 June 1523.

Stockholm was taken on 17 June, and on Midsummer's Eve, 23 June 1523, the newly crowned King Gustav entered the capital. Throughout the summer and fall, the remaining fortresses in the Finnish part of the country surrendered, and in late fall Gustav launched an unsuccessful attempt to capture Gotland from Denmark.

=== 1523 – Change of power in Denmark ===
The events in Sweden raised questions about the regime of Christian II in Denmark. After the executions during the Stockholm bloodbath, his relationship with the Church, both in Rome and in Denmark, became strained. In a failed attempt to create a scapegoat, he executed his advisor Didrik Slagheck, whom he had recently appointed Archbishop of Lund, in January 1522. Christian also enforced a new national land law that limited the power of the nobility and established hereditary royal power. In response, the bishops and councilors of Jutland called for an uprising against Christian. After unsuccessful negotiations, Christian left Denmark in April 1523 and sailed for the Netherlands with his family and his unpopular advisor, Sigbrit Willoms. The rebels' candidate for the royal crown was Christian's uncle, Frederik av Gottorp, who was crowned King Frederick I of Denmark on 7 August 1524.

Christian had attempted to limit the power of Lübeck and the Hanseatic League and to make Copenhagen a free staple city and trading center. However, with Frederik's accession to power, which effectively took place in April 1523, this policy changed. Lübeck, which had supported the Danish rebellion, was promised freedom from tariffs not only in Denmark and Norway, but also in Sweden. Initially, Frederick had plans to assert his authority as king in Sweden as well, but he abandoned these plans when Lübeck did not provide the support he expected. Lübeck had no interest in a revived Nordic Union, preferring to maintain good political relations and trade terms with all the Nordic countries.

== 1524 – Peace ==
Gustav Vasa and Frederik I met in Malmö in August 1524, mediated by Lübeck. Shortly thereafter, a peace treaty was negotiated that gave Lübeck and the Hanseatic League responsibility for determining the long-term status of the eastern Danish provinces. This agreement, known as the Malmö Recess, was finalized on 1 September 1524. The result was that Blekinge, Skåne, and Gotland would remain under Danish control, while Sweden ceded its conquest of northern Bohuslän to Norway.

== Aftermath ==
The resolution of old issues was finally achieved through the understanding between Gustav Vasa and Christian III, which led to a 25-year period of peace during their reigns.

After the deaths of Christian III and Gustav Vasa in 1559 and 1560, respectively, Sweden and Denmark–Norway were ruled by young and assertive monarchs: Eric XIV of Sweden and Frederick II of Denmark–Norway. Frederick II sought to revive the Kalmar Union under Danish leadership, while Eric sought to diminish Denmark–Norway's dominant position.

By 1563, during the Northern Seven Years' War, Sweden and Denmark–Norway emerged as competitors for political and economic control of the Baltic region. In 1561, when a significant portion of the Order's northern Baltic states were secularized by Grand Master Gotthard Kettler, both Denmark–Norway and Sweden were drawn into the Livonian War, marking the beginning of a competition that would continue between the two countries.

== Battles ==
- Battle of Falun (February 1521)
- Battle of Brunnbäck Ferry (April 1521)
- Battle of Västerås (29 April 1521)
- Conquest of Uppsala (18 May 1521)
- Conquest of Kalmar (27 May 1523)
- Conquest of Stockholm (16–17 June 1523)

== See also ==
- Wars of national liberation
