= List of twin towns and sister cities in Sweden =

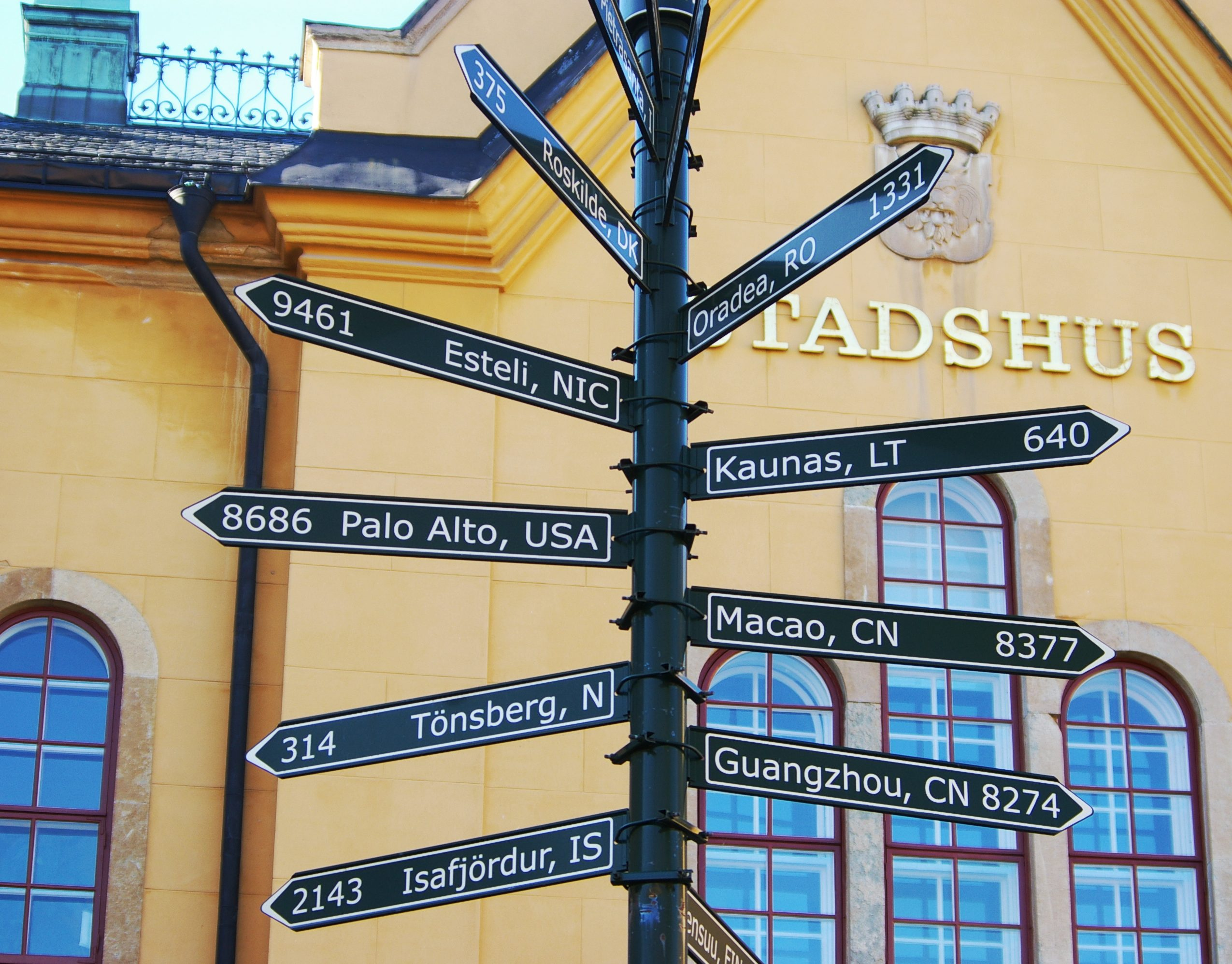
Twin towns of Linköping in 2010

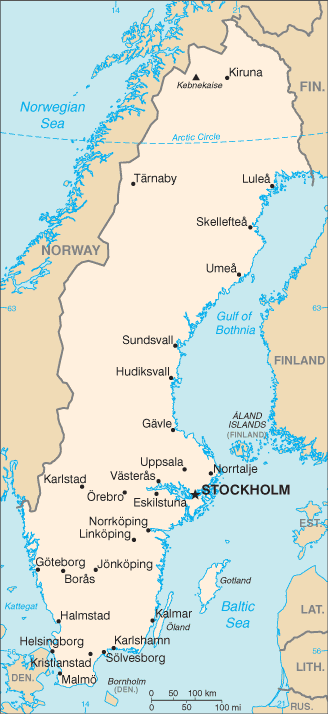
Map of Sweden

This is a list of municipalities of Sweden which have standing links to local communities in other countries known as "town twinning" (Swedish: vänort) (usually in Europe) or "sister cities" (usually in the rest of the world).

As a sign of deteriorating relations with China, Gothenburg, Linköping, Luleå and Västerås, which have had long-standing twinning or partnership agreements with Chinese cities – Shanghai, Guangzhou, Xian and Jinan respectively – have allowed the agreements to lapse in 2020. Linköping mayor Lars Vikinge told that they were terminating all political contact with China because of the unacceptable Chinese hostility towards the Swedish government.

== A ==
Alingsås

- (The Gambia) Kartung, Gambia
- Mont-de-Marsan, France
- Ocotal, Nicaragua
- Lillestrøm, Norway
- Tårnby, Denmark

Älmhult

- Kuršėnai, Lithuania
- Time, Norway

Alvesta

- Krasnystaw, Poland
- Lengede, Germany
- Turnov, Czech Republic

Älvsbyn

- Fauske, Norway
- Haapavesi, Finland

Åmål

- De Pere, United States
- Frogn, Norway
- Gadebusch, Germany
- Kubrat, Bulgaria
- Türi, Estonia

Ängelholm

- Dobele, Latvia
- Høje-Taastrup, Denmark
- Kamen, Germany

Årjäng

- Fanø, Denmark
- Vastseliina (Võru Parish), Estonia

Arjeplog

- Salla, Finland
- Umba, Russia

Arvika

- Kongsvinger, Norway
- Skive, Denmark
- Ylöjärvi, Finland

Askersund

- Eura, Finland
- Jordanów, Poland

== B ==
Bengtsfors

- Wuzhou, China

Berg

- Berg, Germany

Bjurholm

- Bardu, Norway
- Fara Novarese, Italy
- Ii, Finland

Boden

- Alta, Norway
- Apatity, Russia
- Oulu, Finland

Bollnäs

- Flekkefjord, Norway
- Misburg-Anderten (Hanover), Germany
- Ogre, Latvia
- Shepton Mallet, England, United Kingdom

Borås

- Espelkamp, Germany
- Mikkeli, Finland
- Molde, Norway
- Vejle, Denmark

Borgholm

- Korsnäs, Finland
- Łeba, Poland
- Rockford, United States

Borlänge

- Chișinău, Moldova
- Frederikshavn, Denmark
- Larvik, Norway
- Pitești, Romania
- Vestmannaeyjar, Iceland

Botkyrka

- Alytus, Lithuania
- Brøndby, Denmark
- Stange, Norway

Burlöv

- Anklam, Germany

== D ==
Dals-Ed

- Cepoy, France

Danderyd

- Kauniainen, Finland

== E ==
Ekerö

- Otepää, Estonia

Emmaboda

- Bartoszyce, Poland
- Jeppo (Nykarleby), Finland
- Jyderup (Holbæk), Denmark
- Kvam, Norway
- Lefkada, Greece

Enköping

- Kaarina, Finland
- Nedre Eiker, Norway
- Ølstykke (Egedal), Denmark

Eskilstuna

- Bridgeton, United States
- Erlangen, Germany
- Esbjerg, Denmark
- Fjarðabyggð, Iceland
- Haapsalu, Estonia
- Jūrmala, Latvia
- Jyväskylä, Finland
- Luton, England, United Kingdom
- Stavanger, Norway
- Usangi, Tanzania

Eslöv

- Asker, Norway
- Garðabær, Iceland
- Jakobstad, Finland
- Rudersdal, Denmark
- Viljandi, Estonia

== F ==
Falköping

- Fontanellato, Italy
- Kokemäki, Finland
- Lier, Norway
- Mariagerfjord, Denmark

Falun

- Grudziądz, Poland
- Gütersloh, Germany
- Hamina, Finland
- Røros, Norway
- Vordingborg, Denmark

Finspång

- Finsterwalde, Germany
- Joutsa, Finland
- Givet, France
- Salaspils, Latvia
- Stromberg, Germany
- Yvoir, Belgium

Forshaga

- Klützer Winkel, Germany
- Råde, Norway

== G ==
Gällivare

- Barga, Italy
- Kirovsk, Russia
- Kittilä, Finland

Gävle

- Galva, United States
- Gjøvik, Norway
- Jūrmala, Latvia
- Næstved, Denmark
- Rauma, Finland

Gnosjö

- Białogard, Poland

Götene

- Pasvalys, Lithuania

Gothenburg

- Aarhus, Denmark
- Bergen, Norway
- Chicago, United States
- Kraków, Poland
- Lyon, France
- Nelson Mandela Bay, South Africa
- Rostock, Germany
- Turku, Finland

Gotland

- Gammalsvenskby (Zmiivka), Ukraine
- Kragerø, Norway
- Lübeck, Germany
- Mariehamn, Åland Islands, Finland
- Rhodes, Greece
- Saaremaa, Estonia
- Samsø, Denmark
- Soest, Germany
- Valkeakoski, Finland

== H ==
Håbo

- Fredensborg, Denmark
- Ingå, Finland
- Nittedal, Norway
- Paide, Estonia

Hällefors

- Jelgava, Latvia
- Lüchow, Germany
- Orkland, Norway

Hallsberg

- Gifhorn, Germany
- Jajce, Bosnia and Herzegovina

Halmstad

- Gentofte, Denmark
- Hanko, Finland
- Nikopol, Ukraine
- Stord, Norway

Haninge

- Formia, Italy
- Ishøj, Denmark
- Haapsalu, Estonia
- Krokom, Sweden
- Pargas, Finland

Haparanda

- Hammerfest, Norway
- Kovdor, Russia
- Širvintos, Lithuania

Härryda

- Laitila, Finland
- Võru, Estonia

Hässleholm

- Darłowo, Poland
- Eckernförde, Germany
- Nykøbing Sjælland (Odsherred), Denmark

Hedemora

- Bauska, Latvia
- Follonica, Italy
- Gera, Tanzania
- Ishozi, Tanzania
- Ishunju, Tanzania
- (Georgia (country)) Khashuri, Georgia

Helsingborg

- Alexandria, United States
- Dubrovnik, Croatia
- Pärnu, Estonia

Herrljunga

- Kamianets-Podilskyi, Ukraine
- Ukmergė, Lithuania

Höganäs

- Dombóvár, Hungary
- Herlev, Denmark
- Lieto, Finland
- Nesodden, Norway
- Seltjarnarnes, Iceland
- Wittstock, Germany

Hörby

- Peja, Kosovo
- Terjärv (Kronoby), Finland

Huddinge

- Askim, Norway
- Vantaa, Finland

Hultsfred

- Rumia, Poland

Hylte

- Lihula (Lääneranna), Estonia
- Piecki, Poland

== J ==
Jönköping

- Bodø, Norway
- Kuopio, Finland
- Lääne-Viru County, Estonia
- Svendborg, Denmark
- Tianjin, China

== K ==
Kalmar

- Árborg, Iceland
- Arendal, Norway
- Entebbe, Uganda
- Gdańsk, Poland
- Panevėžys, Lithuania
- Savonlinna, Finland
- Wilmington, United States
- Wismar, Germany

Karlshamn

- Heinola, Finland
- Sopot, Poland
- Stade, Germany

Karlskoga

- Aalborg, Denmark
- Fredrikstad, Norway
- Narva, Estonia
- Norðurþing, Iceland
- Olaine, Latvia
- Riihimäki, Finland
- Sanremo, Italy
- Wheaton, United States

Karlskrona

- Aizpute, Latvia
- Chortkiv, Ukraine
- Gdynia, Poland
- Klaipėda, Lithuania
- Loviisa, Finland
- Ólafsfjörður, Iceland

Karlstad

- Blönduós, Iceland
- Gaziantep, Turkey
- Horsens, Denmark
- Jõgeva, Estonia
- Moss, Norway
- Nokia, Finland

Kävlinge

- Nowogard, Poland

Kil

- Laihia, Finland
- Trysil, Norway

Kiruna

- Narvik, Norway
- Rovaniemi, Finland
- (Georgia (country)) Rustavi, Georgia

Klippan

- Akaa, Finland
- Limbaži, Latvia
- Sande, Norway

Knivsta

- Jomala, Åland Islands, Finland

Kristianstad

- Budafok-Tétény (Budapest), Hungary
- Espoo, Finland
- Køge, Denmark
- Kongsberg, Norway
- Rendsburg, Germany
- Skagafjörður, Iceland

Kumla

- Aurskog-Høland, Norway
- Frederikssund, Denmark
- Sipoo, Finland

Kungälv

- Hiddenhausen, Germany
- Perano, Italy

Kungsbacka

- Saarijärvi, Finland
- Šternberk, Czech Republic

== L ==
Laholm

- Amber Valley, England, United Kingdom
- Głogów, Poland
- Møn (Vordingborg), Denmark
- Nurmes, Finland
- Volda, Norway

Landskrona

- Glostrup, Denmark
- Kotka, Finland
- Plochingen, Germany
- Võru, Estonia

Leksand

- Aurora, Canada
- Brainerd, United States
- Hørsholm, Denmark
- Karksi-Nuia (Mulgi), Estonia
- Lillehammer, Norway
- Oulainen, Finland
- Tōbetsu, Japan

Lerum

- Aalborg, Denmark
- Ķekava, Latvia
- Vihanti (Raahe), Finland

Lidingö

- Lohja, Finland
- Saldus, Latvia
- Slavuta, Ukraine

Lidköping

- Kecskemét, Hungary
- Utena, Lithuania

Lilla Edet

- Nome, Norway
- Nurmijärvi, Finland

Lindesberg

- Haßberge (district), Germany
- Jammerbugt, Denmark
- Oppdal, Norway

Linköping

- Ísafjarðarbær, Iceland
- Joensuu, Finland
- Kaunas, Lithuania
- Linz, Austria
- Palo Alto, United States
- Tønsberg, Norway

Ljungby

- Ås, Norway
- Paimio, Finland
- Šilutė, Lithuania

Ljusdal

- Assens, Denmark
- Ikaalinen, Finland
- Schlieben, Germany
- Vinni, Estonia

Ludvika

- Bad Honnef, Germany
- Imatra, Finland

Luleå

- Kemi, Finland
- Puerto Cabezas, Nicaragua
- Santa Lucía de Tirajana, Spain
- Tromsø, Norway
- Zenica, Bosnia and Herzegovina

Lund

- Dalvíkurbyggð, Iceland
- Greifswald, Germany
- Hamar, Norway
- León, Nicaragua
- Nevers, France
- Porvoo, Finland
- Rivne, Ukraine
- Viborg, Denmark
- Zabrze, Poland

Lycksele

- Ähtäri, Finland
- Paltamo, Finland
- Vefsn, Norway

== M ==
Malmö

- Port Adelaide Enfield, Australia
- Stralsund, Germany
- Szczecin, Poland
- Tallinn, Estonia
- Tangshan, China
- Vaasa, Finland
- Varna, Bulgaria

Mariestad

- Kamianets-Podilskyi, Ukraine
- Ukmergė, Lithuania

Mark

- Apolda, Germany
- Ontinyent, Spain
- Szamotuły, Poland

Markaryd

- Bytów, Poland
- Pälkäne, Finland
- Vestre Toten, Norway

Mellerud

- Sant'Agata Feltria, Italy
- Scandia, United States

Mjölby

- Häädemeeste, Estonia
- Hankasalmi, Finland
- Karmøy, Norway

Mölndal terminated all its twinnings.

Mora terminated all its twinnings.

Motala

- Daugavpils, Latvia
- Hyvinkää, Finland

Munkedal

- Neuenkirchen, Germany

== N ==
Nässjö

- Brønderslev, Denmark
- Eidsberg, Norway

Nora

- Fladungen, Germany
- Hône, Italy
- Põhja-Sakala, Estonia

Nordmaling

- Sint-Genesius-Rode, Belgium
- Suomussalmi, Finland

Norrköping

- Esslingen am Neckar, Germany
- Klaksvík, Faroe Islands
- Kópavogur, Iceland
- Linz, Austria
- Odense, Denmark
- Riga, Latvia
- Tampere, Finland
- Trondheim, Norway

Norrtälje

- Hiiumaa, Estonia
- Paldiski (Lääne-Harju), Estonia
- Rūjiena (Valmiera), Latvia
- Sel, Norway
- Sicaya, Bolivia
- Vihti, Finland

Nynäshamn

- Kimitoön, Finland
- Kalundborg, Denmark
- Liepāja, Latvia
- Lillesand, Norway

== O ==
Ockelbo is a member of the Charter of European Rural Communities, a town twinning association across the European Union. Ockelbo also has one other twin town.

Charter of European Rural Communities

- Bienvenida, Spain
- Bièvre, Belgium
- Bucine, Italy
- (Republic of Ireland) Cashel, Ireland
- Cissé, France
- Desborough, England, United Kingdom
- Esch (Haaren), Netherlands
- Hepstedt, Germany
- Ibănești, Romania
- Kandava (Tukums), Latvia
- Kannus, Finland
- Kolindros, Greece
- Lassee, Austria
- Medzev, Slovakia
- Næstved, Denmark
- Nagycenk, Hungary
- Nadur, Malta
- Pano Lefkara, Cyprus
- Põlva, Estonia
- Samuel (Soure), Portugal
- Starý Poddvorov, Czech Republic
- Strzyżów, Poland
- Svoge, Bulgaria
- Tisno, Croatia
- Troisvierges, Luxembourg
- Žagarė (Joniškis), Lithuania

Other

- Stromsburg, United States

Olofström

- Kwidzyn, Poland

Örebro

- Drammen, Norway
- Kolding, Denmark
- Lappeenranta, Finland
- Stykkishólmur, Iceland

Örnsköldsvik

- Äänekoski, Finland
- Hveragerði, Iceland
- Ikast-Brande, Denmark
- Sigdal, Norway
- Tarp, Germany

Orust

- Aalborg, Denmark
- Teuva, Finland

Osby

- Gribskov, Denmark
- Kretinga, Lithuania

Oskarshamn

- Korsholm, Finland
- Mandal, Norway
- Middelfart, Denmark
- Pärnu, Estonia
- Ray Nkonyeni, South Africa

Östersund

- Kajaani, Finland
- Odense, Denmark
- Sanok, Poland

Östhammar

- Durbuy, Belgium
- Kościelisko, Poland
- Orimattila, Finland
- (Georgia (country)) Poti, Georgia
- Tvrdošín, Slovakia
- Valga, Estonia
- Valka, Latvia

Östra Göinge

- Kelmė, Lithuania
- Laukaa, Finland
- Modum, Norway
- Stevns, Denmark

Oxelösund is a member of the Douzelage, a town twinning association of towns across the European Union. Oxelösund also has one other twin town.

Douzelage

- Agros, Cyprus
- Altea, Spain
- Asikkala, Finland
- Bad Kötzting, Germany
- Bellagio, Italy
- (Republic of Ireland) Bundoran, Ireland
- Chojna, Poland
- Granville, France
- Holstebro, Denmark
- Houffalize, Belgium
- Judenburg, Austria
- Kőszeg, Hungary
- Marsaskala, Malta
- Meerssen, Netherlands
- Niederanven, Luxembourg
- Preveza, Greece
- Rokiškis, Lithuania
- Rovinj, Croatia
- Sesimbra, Portugal
- Sherborne, England, United Kingdom
- Sigulda, Latvia
- Siret, Romania
- Škofja Loka, Slovenia
- Sušice, Czech Republic
- Tryavna, Bulgaria
- Türi, Estonia
- Zvolen, Slovakia

Other

- Kronstadt, Russia

== P ==
Piteå

- Grindavík, Iceland
- Kandalaksha, Russia
- Saint Barthélemy, France

== R ==
Robertsfors

- Kuhmo, Finland
- Sørfold, Norway

Ronneby

- Bornholm, Denmark
- Elbląg, Poland
- Enfield, United States
- Gherla, Romania
- Høyanger, Norway
- Johnson City, United States
- Mänttä-Vilppula, Finland
- Schopfheim, Germany
- Steglitz-Zehlendorf (Berlin), Germany

== S ==
Sala

- Åndalsnes, Rauma, Norway
- Kristinestad, Finland
- Pao, Chad
- Pont-Sainte-Marie, France
- Rosenholm (Syddjurs), Denmark
- Vändra (Põhja-Pärnumaa), Estonia

Sandviken

- Nakskov (Lolland), Denmark
- Rjukan, Tinn, Norway
- Varkaus, Finland

Sigtuna

- Łomża, Poland
- Porsgrunn, Norway
- Raisio, Finland
- Rakvere, Estonia

Simrishamn

- Barth, Germany
- Bornholm, Denmark
- Kołobrzeg, Poland
- Palanga, Lithuania

Sjöbo

- Teterow, Germany
- Trzebiatów, Poland

Skara

- Eidsvoll, Norway
- Fljótsdalshérað, Iceland
- Radviliškis, Lithuania
- Sorø, Denmark
- Zeven, Germany

Skellefteå

- Pardubice, Czech Republic
- Raahe, Finland
- Rana, Norway
- Tongling, China
- Vesthimmerland, Denmark

Skövde

- Halden, Norway
- Kuressaare (Saaremaa), Estonia
- Ringsted, Denmark
- Sastamala, Finland
- Zhangjiakou, China

Skurup

- Niepars, Germany

Smedjebacken

- Petroșani, Romania
- Virolahti, Finland

Söderhamn

- Kunda (Viru-Nigula), Estonia
- Szczecinek, Poland
- Szigethalom, Hungary

Söderköping

- Talsi, Latvia

Södertälje

- Angers, France
- Forssa, Finland
- Pärnu, Estonia
- Sarpsborg, Norway
- Struer, Denmark
- Wuxi, China

Sollefteå

- Esashi, Japan
- Madison, United States
- Nykarleby, Finland
- Põltsamaa, Estonia
- Slovenske Konjice, Slovenia
- Steinkjer, Norway

Sollentuna

- Hvidovre, Denmark
- Oppegård, Norway
- Saue, Estonia
- Tuusula, Finland

Solna

- Burbank, United States
- Gladsaxe, Denmark
- Pirkkala, Finland
- Ski, Norway
- Valmiera, Latvia

Sölvesborg

- Malbork, Poland
- Wolgast, Germany

Staffanstorp

- Grimmen, Germany
- (Republic of Ireland) Killarney, Ireland
- Kohtla-Järve, Estonia
- Ozzano dell'Emilia, Italy
- Vallensbæk, Denmark
- Viitasaari, Finland
- Wolin, Poland

Stockholm – the policy of Stockholm is to have informal town twinning with all capitals of the world, its main focus being those in northern Europe. Stockholm does not sign any formal town twinning treaties, and has only cooperation agreements on specific issues limited in time.

Storuman

- Viitasaari, Finland
- Żywiec, Poland

Strängnäs

- Kisko (Salo), Finland
- Loiborsoit (Lolkisale), Tanzania
- Muurla (Salo), Finland
- Olsztynek, Poland
- Ratzeburg, Germany
- Rheinsberg, Germany
- Ribe (Esbjerg), Denmark
- Saku, Estonia
- Sauvo, Finland
- Sogndal, Norway
- Tukums, Latvia

Strömstad

- Ledbury, England, United Kingdom

Sundbyberg

- Alūksne, Latvia
- Kirkkonummi, Finland

Surahammar

- Juupajoki, Finland
- Nore og Uvdal, Norway
- Tarvastu (Viljandi Parish), Estonia
- Wahlstedt, Germany

Svalöv

- Kalundborg, Denmark
- Kėdainiai, Lithuania
- Kyritz, Germany
- Łobez, Poland

Svedala

- Bergen auf Rügen, Germany
- Goleniów, Poland
- Ishøj, Denmark

Svenljunga

- Chizhou, China
- Rehna, Germany
- Tamsalu (Tapa), Estonia

== T ==
Täby

- Järvenpää, Finland
- Lørenskog, Norway
- Rødovre, Denmark
- Viimsi, Estonia

Tanum

- Capo di Ponte, Italy
- Faaborg-Midtfyn, Denmark
- Hole, Norway
- Kustavi, Finland
- Strandabyggð, Iceland

Tierp

- Forssa, Finland
- Hauho (Hämeenlinna), Finland
- Janakkala, Finland
- Vågå, Norway

Tingsryd

- Keuruu, Finland
- Langeland, Denmark
- Lindström, United States
- Skaun, Norway

Töreboda

- Iecava, Latvia

Torsby

- Bømlo, Norway
- Easter Island, Chile
- Großkrotzenburg, Germany
- Pernå (Loviisa), Finland
- Rautalampi, Finland
- Ringkøbing-Skjern, Denmark

Trelleborg

- Bitola, North Macedonia
- Sassnitz, Germany
- Stralsund, Germany

Trollhättan

- Kerava, Finland
- Kristiansand, Norway
- Reykjanesbær, Iceland
- Tempe, United States

Tyresö

- Cēsis, Latvia
- Savigny-le-Temple, France

== U ==
Uddevalla

- Jõhvi, Estonia
- Loimaa, Finland
- Mosfellsbær, Iceland
- North Ayrshire, Scotland, United Kingdom
- Okazaki, Japan
- Skien, Norway
- Thisted, Denmark

Umeå

- Harstad, Norway
- Helsingør, Denmark
- Saskatoon, Canada
- Vaasa, Finland
- Würzburg, Germany

Uppsala

- Bærum, Norway
- Daejeon, South Korea
- Frederiksberg, Denmark
- Hafnarfjörður, Iceland
- Hämeenlinna, Finland
- Minneapolis, United States
- Tartu, Estonia

== V ==
Vadstena

- Naantali, Finland
- Nordfyn, Denmark
- Svelvik, Norway

Vänersborg

- Arsuk, Greenland
- Countryside, Åland Islands, Finland
- Eiði, Faroe Islands
- Herning, Denmark
- Holmestrand, Norway
- Husby, Germany
- Kangasala, Finland
- Lich, Germany
- Siglufjörður, Iceland

Vännäs

- Cameri, Italy
- Hemnes, Norway
- Isokyrö, Finland

Vansbro

- Kalajoki, Finland
- Velké Meziříčí, Czech Republic

Vara

- Catarroja, Spain
- Kadaň, Czech Republic
- Mäntsälä, Finland
- Märjamaa, Estonia
- Vestby, Norway

Varberg

- Haderslev, Denmark
- Karlovy Vary, Czech Republic
- Uusikaupunki, Finland

Västerås

- Akureyri, Iceland
- Ålesund, Norway
- Kassel, Germany
- Lahti, Finland
- Randers, Denmark

Västervik

- Akranes, Iceland
- Bamble, Norway
- Närpes, Finland
- Tønder, Denmark
- Ventspils, Latvia

Växjö

- Aabenraa, Denmark
- Almere, Netherlands
- Duluth, United States
- Kalush, Ukraine
- Kaunas, Lithuania
- Lancaster, England, United Kingdom
- Lohja, Finland
- Pobiedziska, Poland
- Ringerike, Norway
- Schwerin, Germany

Vimmerby

- Joniškis, Lithuania
- Kauhava, Finland
- Mukono Town, Uganda
- Rygge, Norway
- Skærbæk (Tønder), Denmark
- Þorlákshöfn, Iceland

Vingåker

- Kiikala (Salo), Finland
- Måsøy, Norway
- Mühltal, Germany
- Pühalepa (Hiiumaa), Estonia
