= Rällingsberg mining area =

Coordinates: 60°28′3″N 16°2′35″E

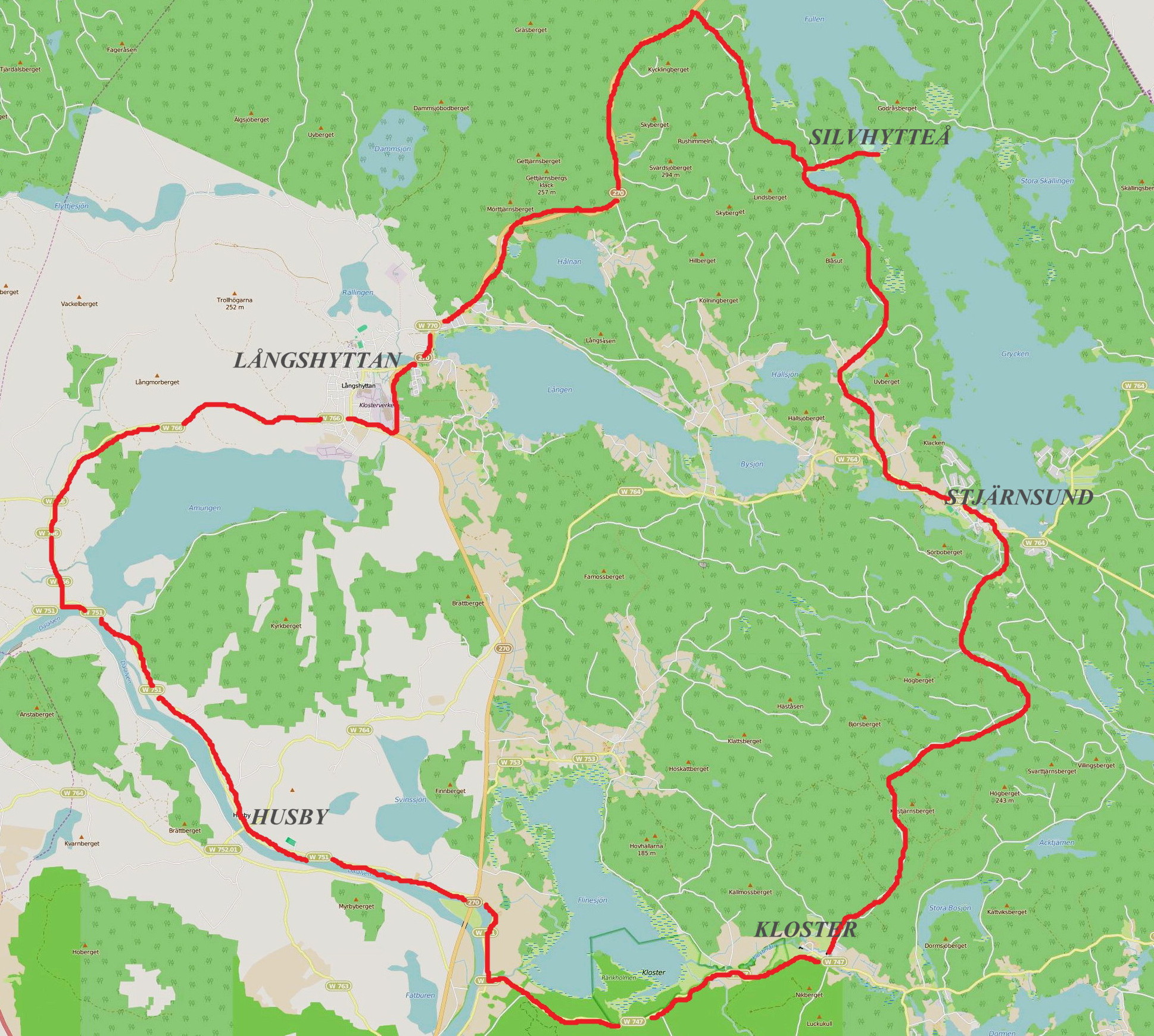
Husbyringen nature and culture trail

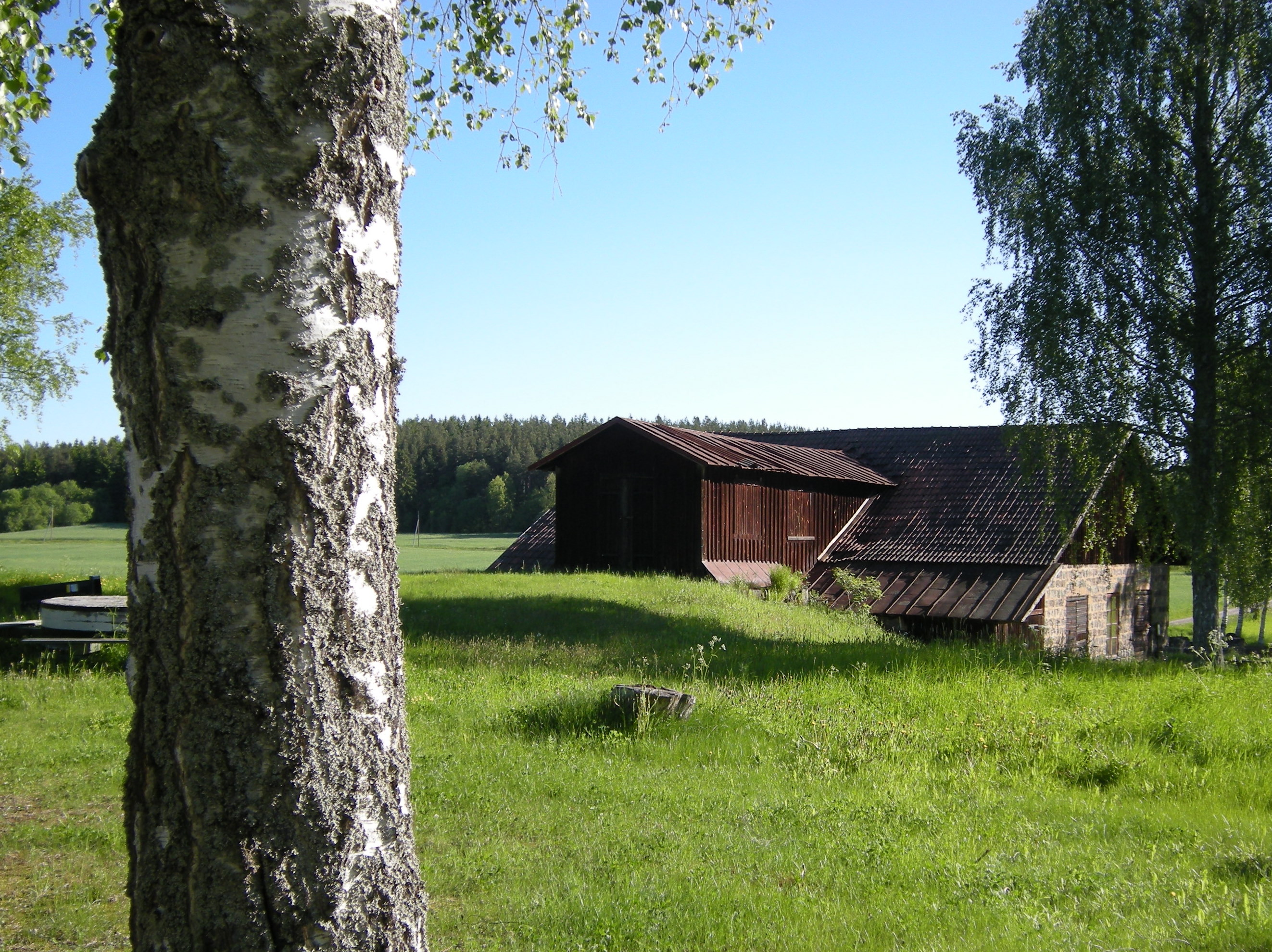
Dynamo house in Rällingsberg 2010.

Rällingsberg mining area (Swedish: Rällingsbergs gruvor) is an area with four defunct iron mines outside the community of Långshyttan in the parish of Husby in Hedemora Municipality, Dalarna County, Sweden. The former mining area now forms part of the Husbyringen nature and culture trail.

== History ==
The mining field was discovered in 1841 by farmworker, Clas Westerholm. With a borrowed mining compass he found a widespread magnetic field east of Lake Rällingen near a piece of farmland called Gruvvreten (swedish for mining field). He got his claim registered January 30, 1841 and became half-owner of the prospect together with the owner of Kloster's Mill (Klosters bruk).

In June the same year a contract was made on mining in what was to become Rällingsbergsgruvan. After six years Westerholm was bought out of the mine for 8 000 kronor, but about 35 years later a second payment was made of the sum 5 000 kronor, since he had spent all his money and was rendered poor. In 1871 the owners of the ironworks started the stock company Klosters AB and in 1892 Rällingsbergs gruvaktiebolag was formed as a daughter company. Klosters AB established a narrow-track railway in 1891 for its cargo between the use at Långshyttan and Stjernsund.

The ore in the mine had a high quantity of manganese and was suitable for bessemer iron that was produced in the new blast furnace at Klosterverken in Långshyttan (Klosterverken Långshyttan) from 1861 (with an interruption 1864–1868). To have access to its own ore reduced the cost of the company at Kloster considerably, partly compensating for the lack of own charcoal.

Rällingsberg mine received electric power from 1918. The mines were run until 1932.

== Husbyringen ==
Husbyringen was opened in 1970 by the Husbyrgen Foundation (Stiftelsen Husbyringen and claims to be Sweden's first ecomuseum. Around the 6 km long nature and cultural trail are 30 attractions related to the Rällingsberg mining area, Kloster ironworks and Långshyttan ironworks. Today, the former dynamite house, mining house, machine shop, sorting house, and electric transformer substation remain at the site.

== Gallery ==
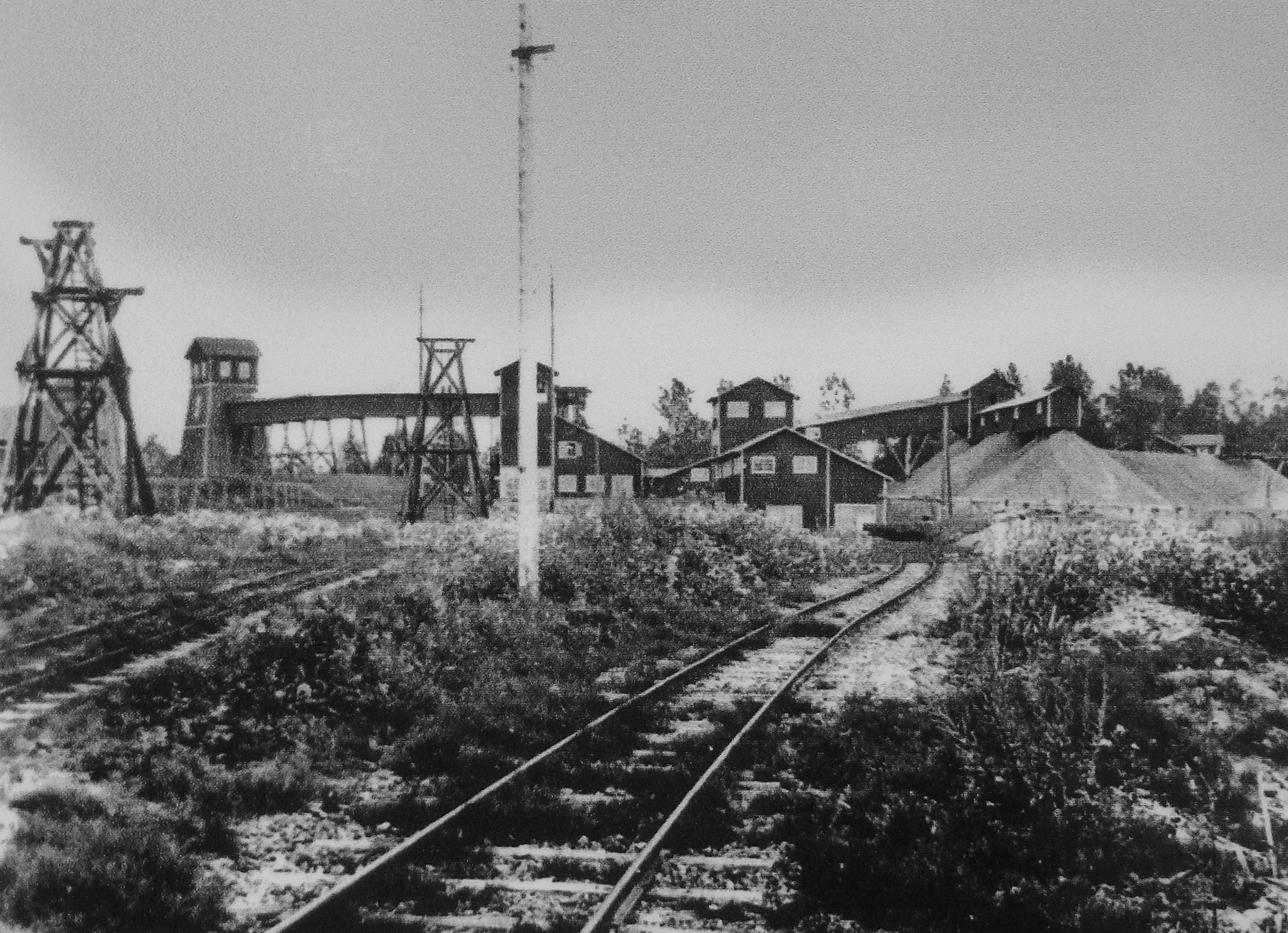
Rällingsberg mine in operation

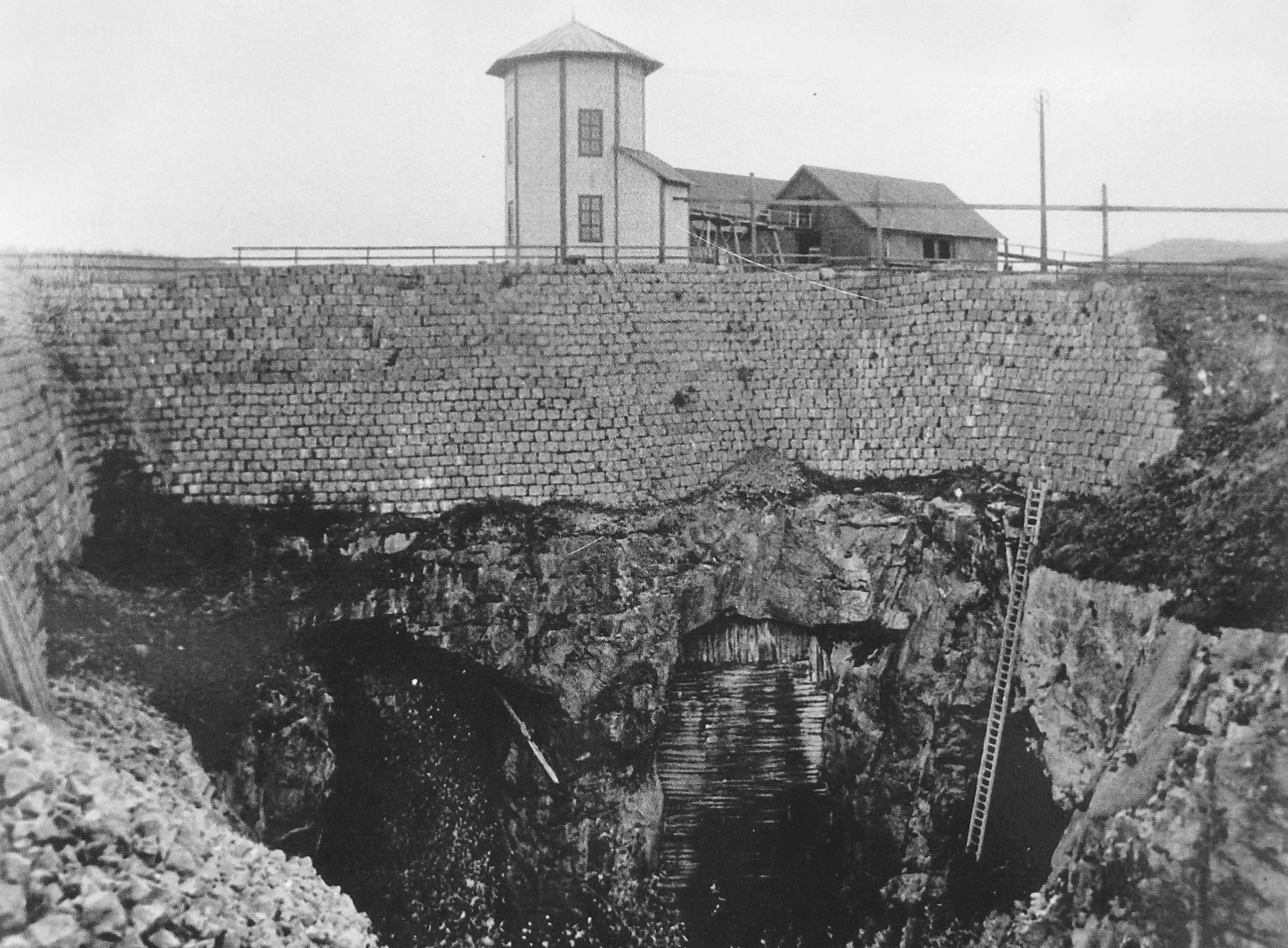
The open-pit "Stora stöten"

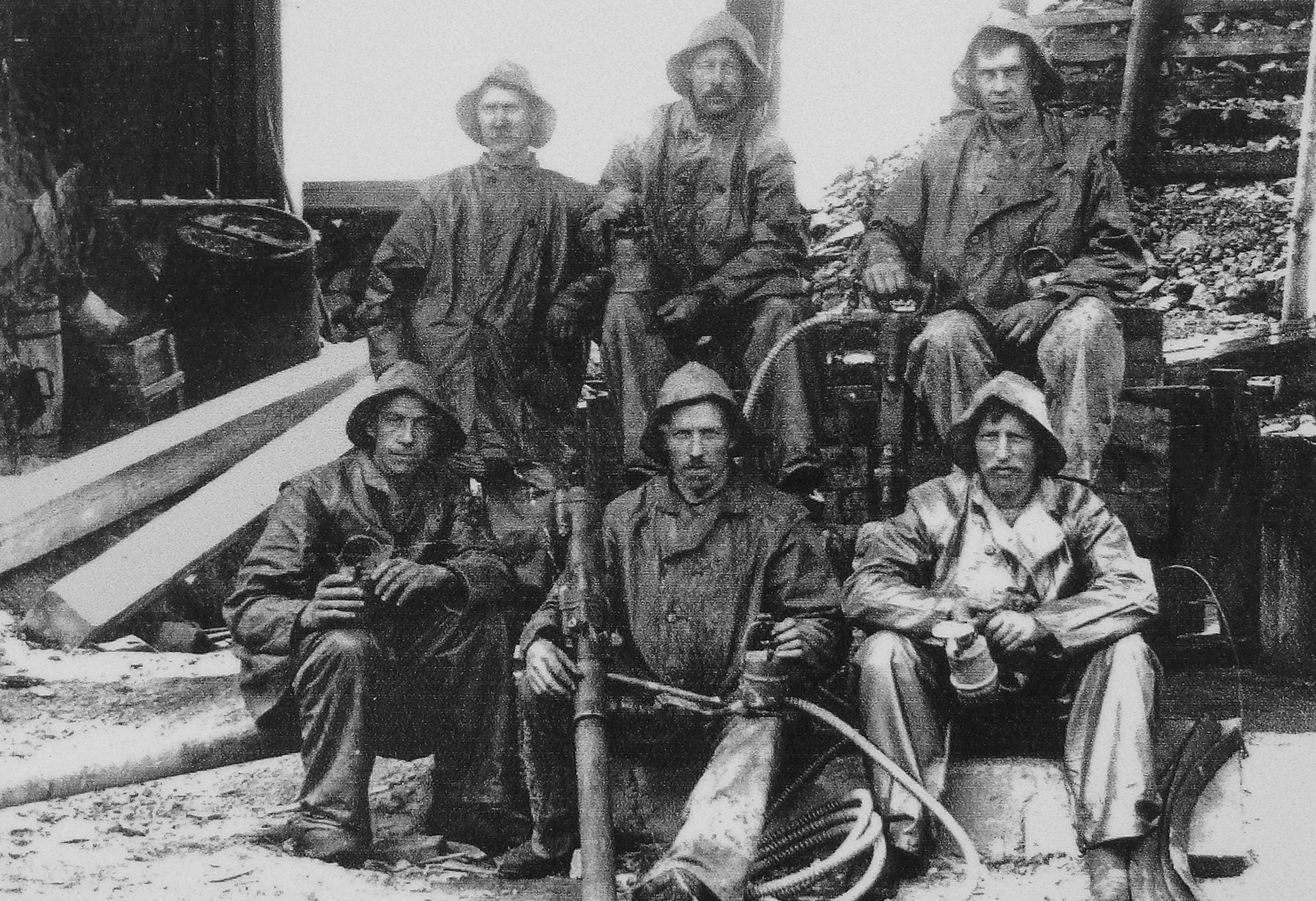
Rällingsberg mine work team

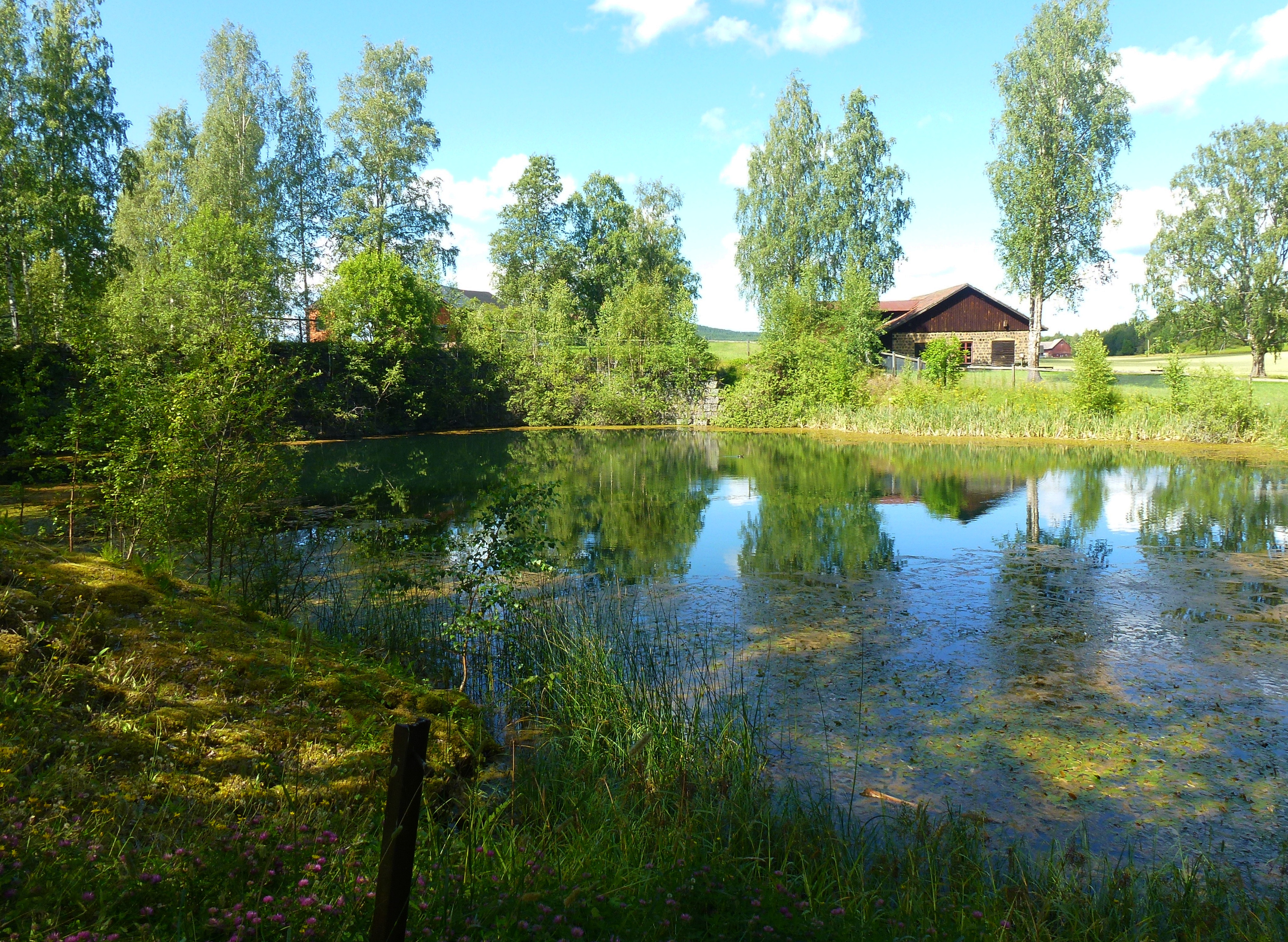
"Stora stöten" filled with water (2015)

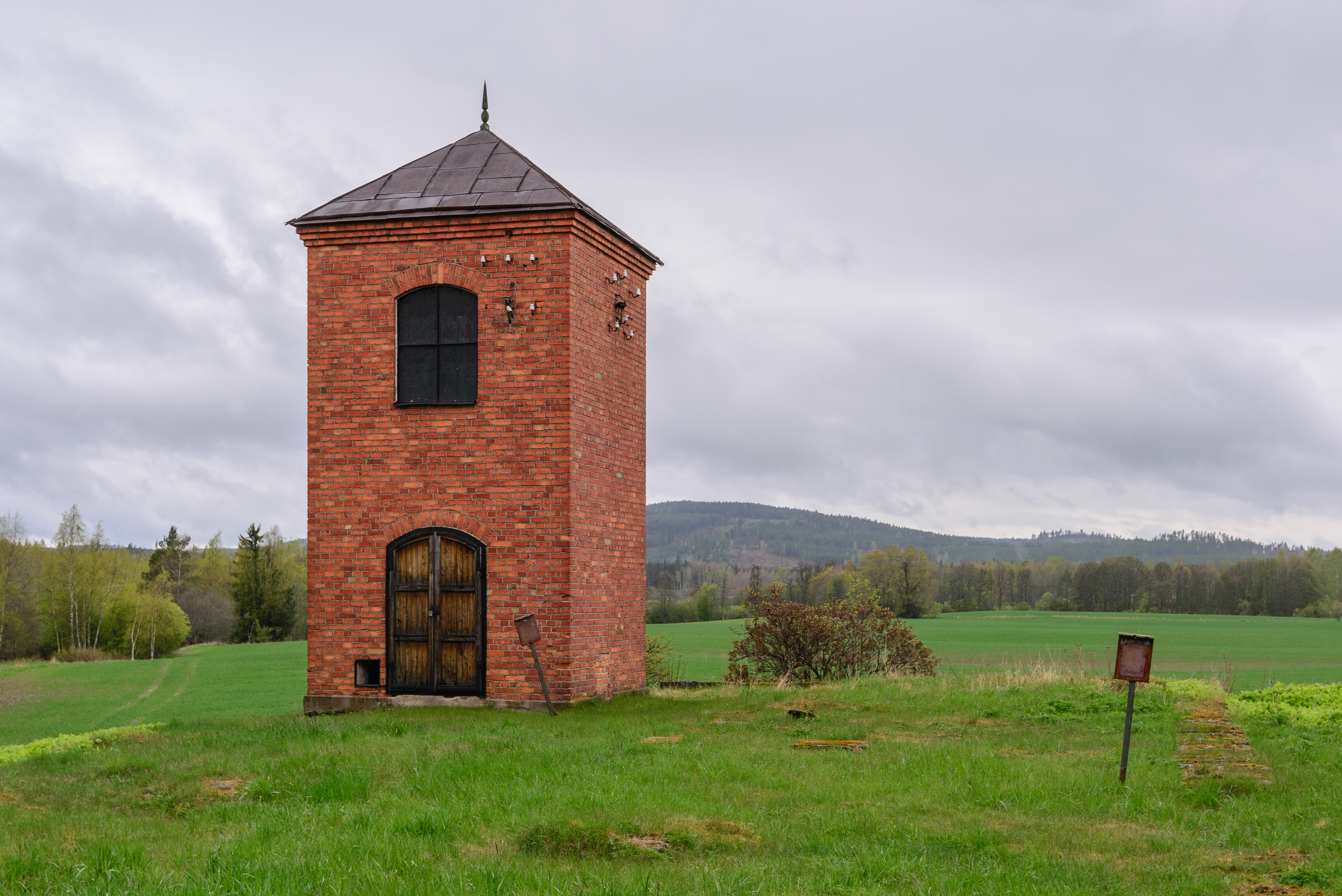
Former electrical transformer substation (2015)

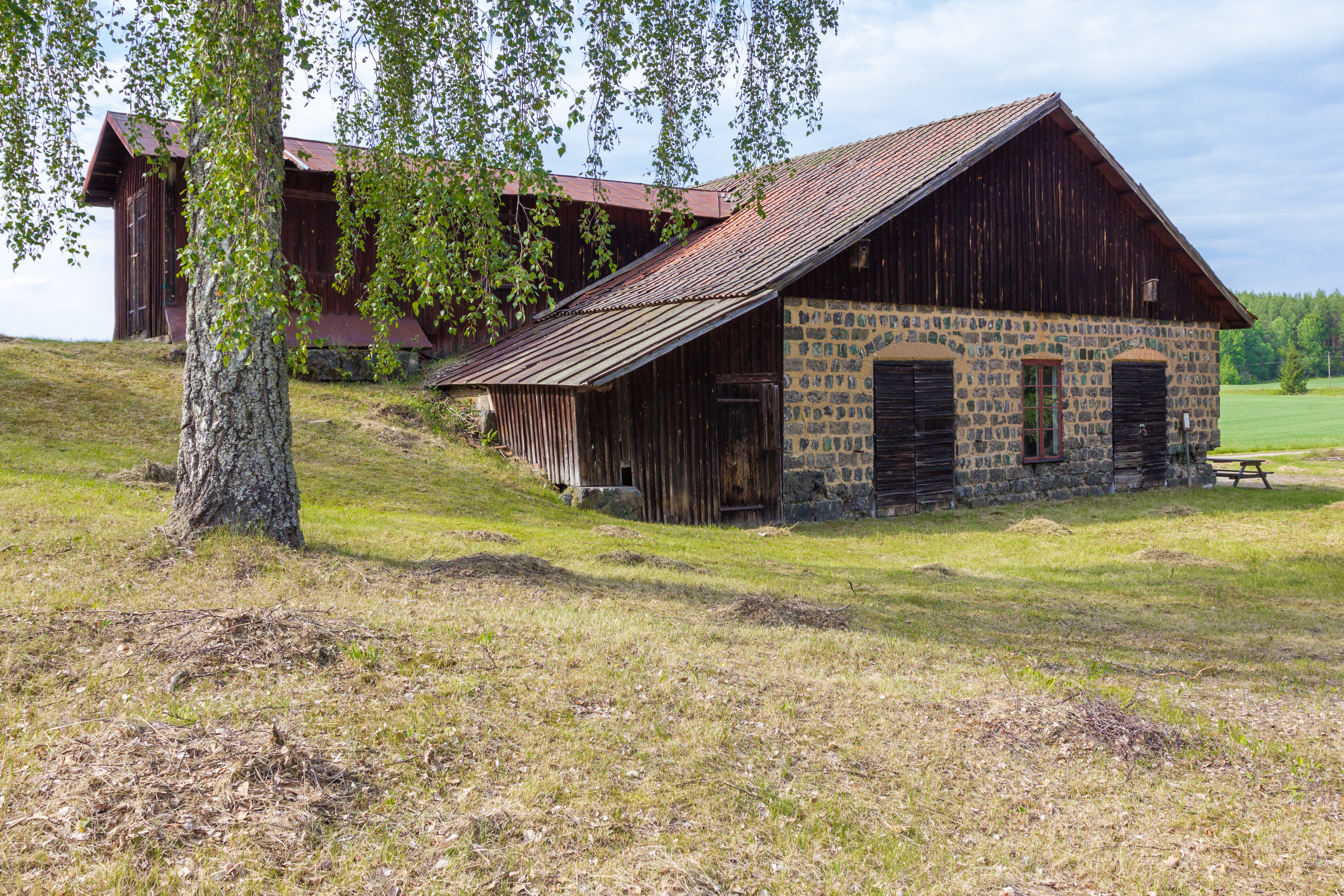
Former dynamite house (2014)

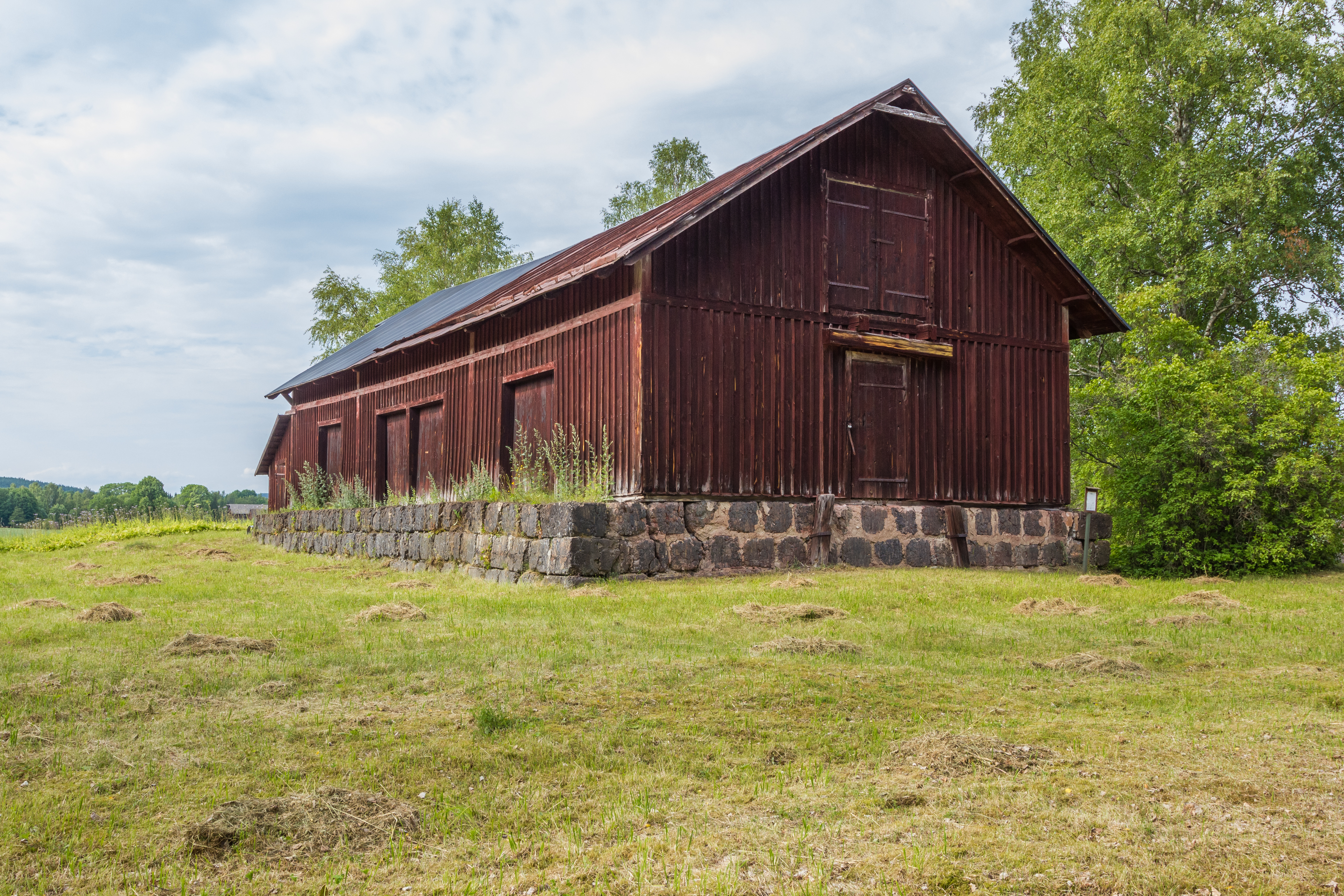
Former sorting house (2014)
