= Brunnbäck =

Settlement near Avesta, Sweden

Coordinates: 60°7′53″N 16°15′12″E

Brunnbäck is a small community in Sweden, eight kilometers southeast of Avesta in Dalarna at a crossing of Dalälven.

In 1521, at the Battle of Brunnbäck Ferry, Swedish rebel troops under Peder Svensson and Olof Bonde defeated a Danish host by encirclement, cementing the Swedish Rebellion and allowing Gustav Vasa sufficient time to raise an army to challenge the Danish king.
