= Siewert Öholm =

Swedish journalist, television presenter and debater (1939-2017)

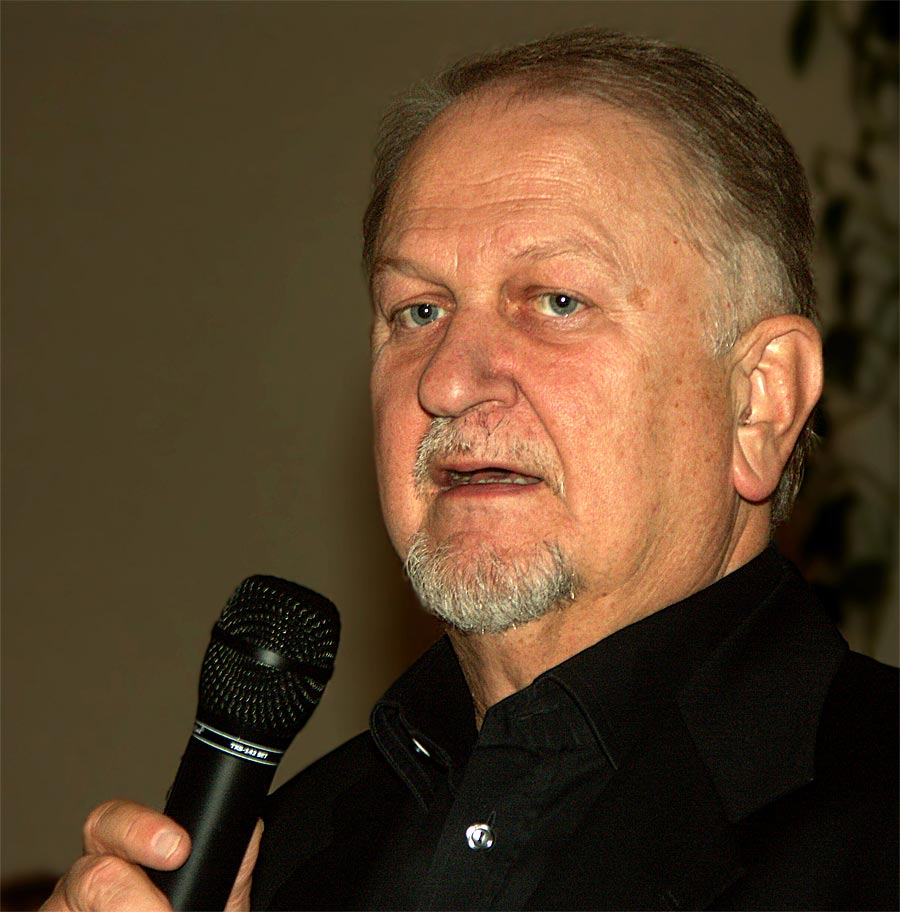
- Siewert Öholm in 2005
- Born: Henrik Siewert Natanael Öholm; 7 August 1939; Husby, Hedemora, Sweden
- Died: 25 January 2017 (aged 77); Växjö, Sweden
- Occupation(s): Journalist, television presenter

Henrik Siewert Natanael Öholm (7 August 1939 – 25 January 2017) was a Swedish journalist, television presenter and debater. He represented a socially conservative viewpoint and spent part of his career with Christian media.

== Career ==
Öholm worked for Sveriges Radio and Sveriges Television from 1971 to 2002, working mainly on TV productions, amongst them the popular choir series Hela kyrkan sjunger, broadcast from 1973 to 1983. He then became the presenter of programmes such as Sveriges Television's Kvällsöppet, Nattcafé and Svar direkt; on Svar direkt he became known as a heated debater.

From 2006 to 2007, Öholm headed the Oslo-based Christian TV channel Verdikanalen, but resigned after the channel had been threatened with cancellation of all broadcasting because of unpaid debts. He then became an editor of the business section in the magazine Världen idag, but resigned in protest of changes in the magazine's leadership. In 2015 Öholm became a member of the board of the Christian web-channel TV2020 AB.

Starting in 2002, Öholm worked as a freelance journalist and debater, and wrote a column for the Christian newspaper Dagen. In 2003 he criticised Jonas Gardell's and Mark Levengood's hosting of the 2003 Melodifestivalen, accusing Sveriges Television of giving in to what he perceived as the "gay lobby" and saying that the couple had made the festival into a manifestation of their sexual orientation that spits in the audience's faces in disrespect. These remarks led to criticism of him in the media, including from Gardell.

After his criticism of the Melodifestivalen Öholm continued to advocate for socially conservative values, including criticising abortion and same-sex marriages.

== Personal life ==
Siewert Öholm had four sons, one of whom is the Moderate Party politician Oskar Öholm.

His first wife, Ann-Britt Öholm, died in November 2004 of breast cancer. He later remarried to Gitten Bolin Öholm.

Öholm died of liver cancer on 25 January 2017 in a hospital in Växjö.
