= Hedemora Municipality =

Hedemora Municipality Hedemora kommun
- Municipality
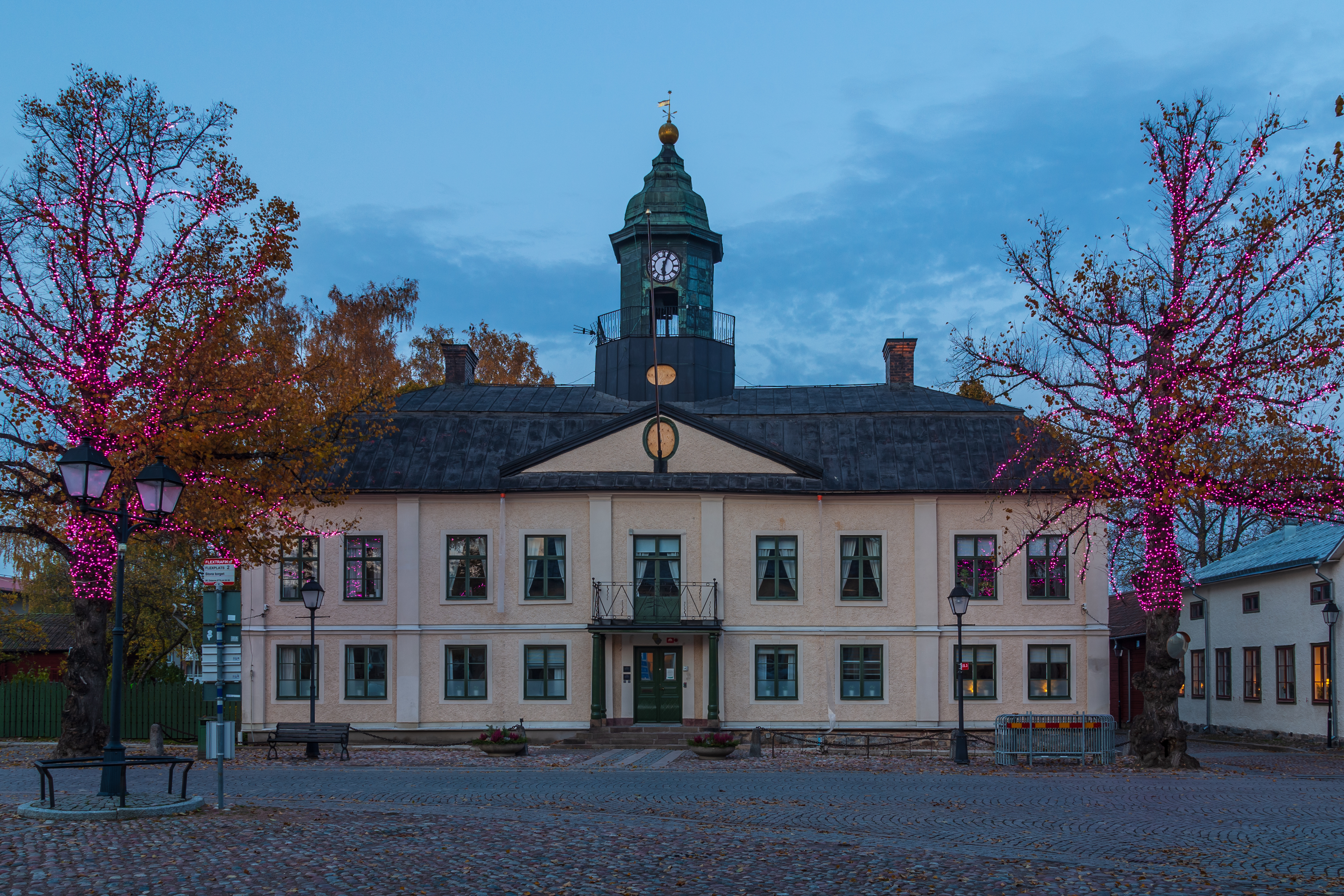
- Hedemora Town Hall

- Coat of arms

- Coordinates: 60°17′N 15°59′E
- Country: Sweden
- County: Dalarna County
- Seat: Hedemora

Area
  - Total: 928.77 km^{2} (358.60 sq mi)
  - Land: 835.1 km^{2} (322.4 sq mi)
  - Water: 93.67 km^{2} (36.17 sq mi)
- Area as of 1 January 2014.

Population (30 June 2025)
  - Total: 15,154
  - Density: 18.15/km^{2} (47.00/sq mi)
- Time zone: UTC+1 (CET)
  - Summer (DST): UTC+2 (CEST)
- ISO 3166 code: SE
- Province: Dalarna
- Municipal code: 2083
- Website: www.hedemora.se
- Density is calculated using land area only.

Hedemora Municipality (Swedish: Hedemora kommun) is a municipality in Dalarna County in central Sweden. Its seat is in the city of Hedemora.

In 1966 the City of Hedemora was amalgamated with the rural municipality by the same name and with Husby.

== Military history ==
Hedemora town was gathering place for the peasant militia during the Swedish War of Liberation against Denmark. In the victorious Battle of Brunnbäck Ferry in 1521, Peder Svensson from the village ofVibberboda in present day Hedemora Municipality was one of the two leaders (the other was Olof Bonde from Norrbärke in today's Smedjebacken Municipality).

During the allotment system, the Colonel's Company of Dalarna Regiment had its recruitment area in Hedemora and Husby parishes. The colonels of the regiment had their seat at Husby during this period at Näs kungsgård and Husby kungsgård.

== Localities ==
- Hedemora (seat)
- Långshyttan
- Vikmanshyttan
- Garpenberg
- Västerby
- Husby

== Demographics ==
This is a demographic table based on Hedemora Municipality's electoral districts in the 2022 Swedish general election sourced from SVT's election platform, in turn taken from SCB official statistics.

In total there were 15,435 inhabitants, including 11,840 Swedish citizens of voting age. 45.0% voted for the left coalition and 53.3% for the right coalition. Indicators are in percentage points except population totals and income.

Location	Residents	Citizen adults	Left vote	Right vote	Employed	Swedish parents	Foreign heritage	Income SEK	Degree
Location			%	%					
Garpenberg	960	687	43.9	51.1	71	80	20	21,961	28
Hedemora NV	2,781	2,087	43.4	55.1	83	84	16	25,770	33
Hedemora NÖ	2,201	1,719	44.3	54.9	81	80	20	22,988	26
Hedemora SV	2,716	1,923	46.0	52.5	77	78	22	24,753	30
Hedemora SÖ	2,459	2,028	46.1	51.8	78	80	20	22,805	27
Husby	1,453	1,137	45.3	52.7	86	91	9	24,051	38
Långshyttan	1,731	1,375	49.7	48.8	73	77	23	21,728	18
Vikmanshyttan	1,134	884	39.3	60.0	77	87	13	23,791	20
Source: SVT

== Riksdag elections ==
Year	%	Votes	V	S	MP	C	L	KD	M	SD	NyD	Left	Right
1973	91.0	10,649	4.1	49.3		31.0	5.5	2.0	7.7			53.4	44.2
1976	91.3	11,203	3.5	48.3		30.5	6.8	1.5	8.7			51.8	46.1
1979	90.5	11,260	4.4	49.8		24.1	6.9	1.6	12.6			54.1	43.5
1982	91.3	11,378	4.7	50.8	2.6	20.0	3.8	1.8	16.3			55.5	40.0
1985	89.5	11,337	5.7	49.5	2.4	17.0	10.8		14.5			55.2	42.2
1988	85.1	10,615	6.6	47.5	5.6	16.3	9.1		11.4			59.8	36.8
1991	86.2	10,677	5.5	43.1	3.8	13.2	6.3	6.5	14.3		5.9	48.6	40.3
1994	86.0	10,706	5.4	49.3	5.6	12.3	4.8	3.7	14.6		0.9	62.7	35.4
1998	80.1	9,637	16.0	40.0	5.3	8.8	2.5	10.4	15.4			61.3	37.1
2002	75.8	8,916	10.4	42.9	5.1	12.9	7.6	7.9	10.6	0.6		58.4	39.0
2006	78.3	9,177	7.4	40.8	4.7	12.1	4.1	5.3	19.5	3.1		52.9	44.0
2010	81.8	9,686	6.4	36.4	6.1	9.6	3.5	4.6	23.9	8.3		48.9	41.5
2014	84.6	9,923	6.1	35.0	4.5	9.3	2.8	3.1	17.7	17.5		45.6	32.9
2018	85.8	9,824	7.5	30.6	2.9	10.0	2.7	6.9	15.3	22.5		50.9	47.4
2022	83.3	9,867	5.6	29.3	3.5	6.2	2.1	6.2	16.1	28.8		44.6	53.3

== Sister cities ==
Hedemora has five sister cities:

- Bauska, Latvia
- Ishozi-Ishunju-Gera, Tanzania
- Nord-Fron, Norway
- Nysted, Denmark
- Vehkalahti, Finland
