= Långshyttan =

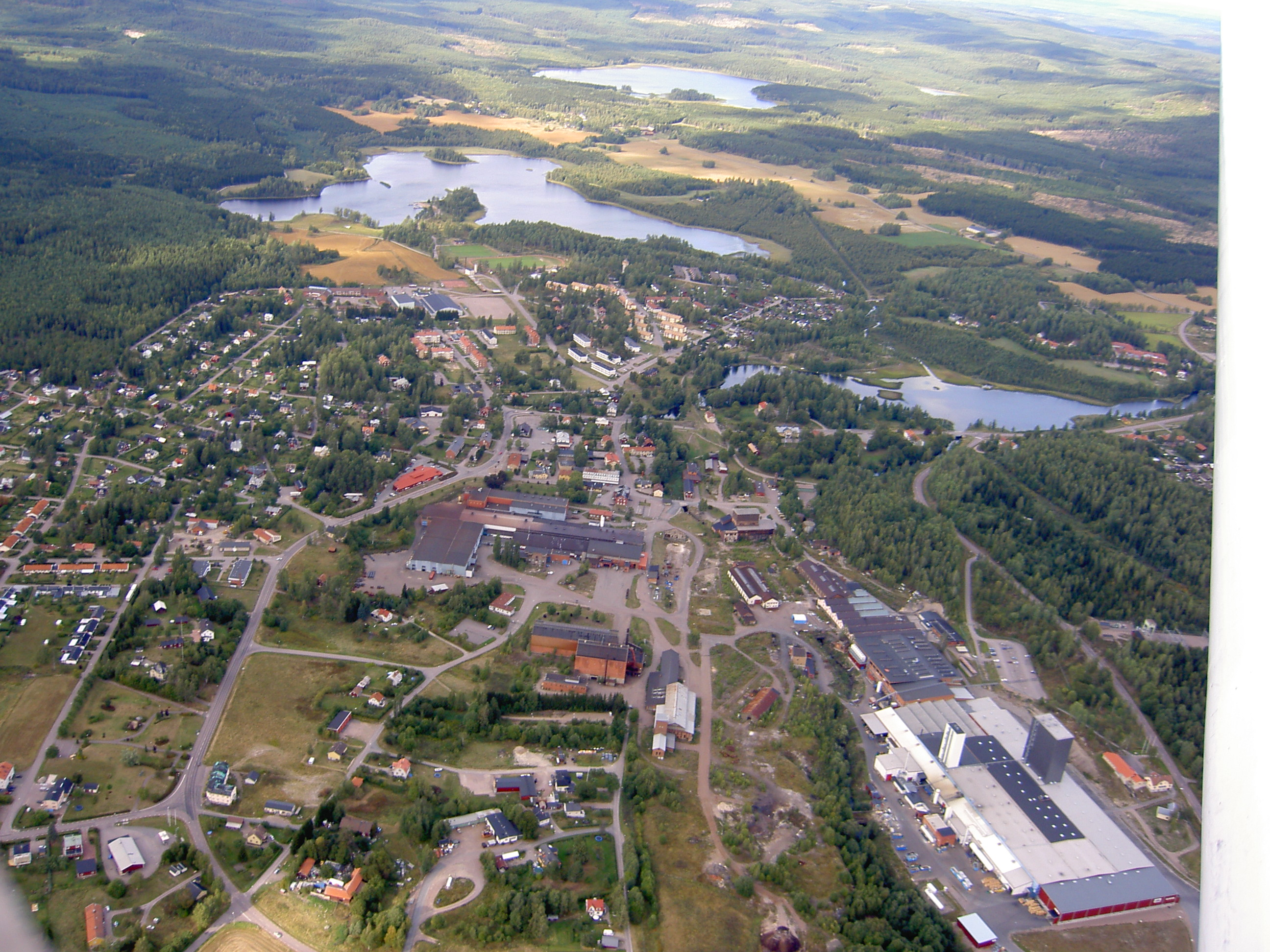
- September 2007 aerial view

- Location within Dalarna Location within Sweden
- Coordinates: 60°27′N 16°01′E
- Country: Sweden
- Province: Dalarna
- County: Dalarna County
- Municipality: Hedemora Municipality

Area
  - Total: 3.28 km^{2} (1.27 sq mi)

Population (31 December 2010)
  - Total: 1,671
  - Density: 510/km^{2} (1,300/sq mi)
- Time zone: UTC+1 (CET)
  - Summer (DST): UTC+2 (CEST)

Långshyttan is a locality situated in Hedemora Municipality, Dalarna County, Sweden with 1,671 inhabitants in 2010.

== See also ==
- Rällingsberg mining area
