= Husby AIK =

Swedish football club

- Full name: Husby Allmänna Idrottsklubb
- Ground: Husbyvallen; Dala-Husby; Sweden
- Chairman: Magnus Röhnisch
- League: Division 4 Dalarna
| Home colours | Away colours |

Husby AIK is a Swedish football club located in Dala-Husby.

== Background ==
Husby AIK currently plays in Division 4 Dalarna which is the sixth tier of Swedish football. They play their home matches at the Husbyvallen in Dala-Husby.

The club is affiliated to Dalarnas Fotbollförbund.

== Season to season ==
| Season | Level | Division | Section | Position | Movements |
|---|---|---|---|---|---|
| 2006* | Tier 8 | Division 6 | Dalarna Södra | 8th | |
| 2007 | Tier 8 | Division 6 | Dalarna Södra | 2nd | |
| 2008 | Tier 8 | Division 6 | Dalarna Södra | 1st | |
| 2009 | Tier 8 | Division 6 | Dalarna Södra | 2nd | Promoted |
| 2010 | Tier 7 | Division 5 | Dalarna Södra | 1st | Promoted |
| 2011 | Tier 6 | Division 4 | Dalarna | 4th | |

* League restructuring in 2006 resulted in a new division being created at Tier 3 and subsequent divisions dropping a level.
