= Västerby, Sweden =

Västerby
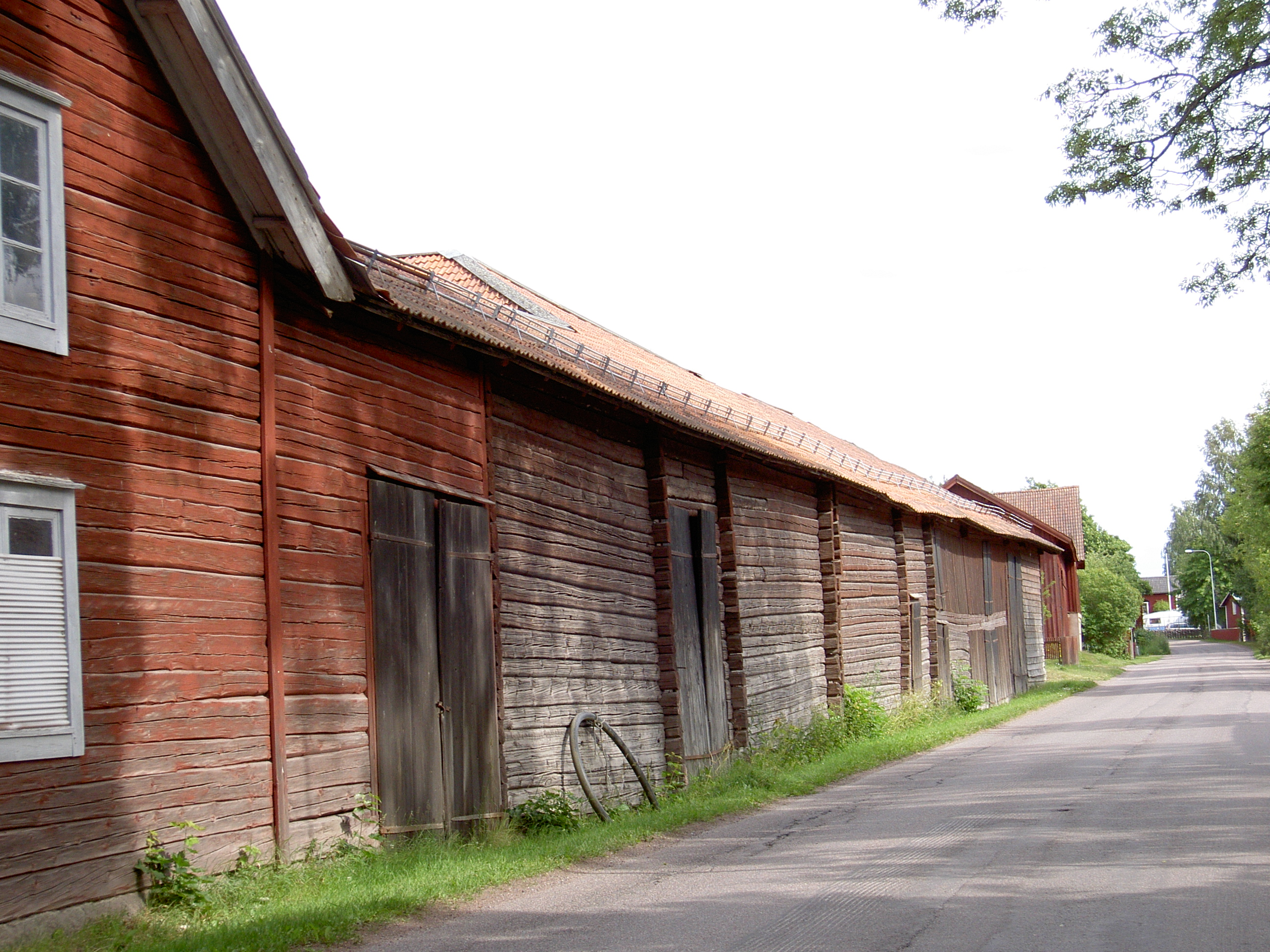
- View from the main road in Västerby, Hedemora municipality, Sweden

- Location within Dalarna Location within Sweden
- Coordinates: 60°19′N 15°56′E
- Country: Sweden
- Province: Dalarna
- County: Dalarna County
- Municipality: Hedemora Municipality

Area
  - Total: 0.58 km^{2} (0.22 sq mi)

Population (31 December 2010)
  - Total: 368
  - Density: 639/km^{2} (1,660/sq mi)
- Time zone: UTC+1 (CET)
  - Summer (DST): UTC+2 (CEST)

Västerby is a locality situated in Hedemora Municipality, Dalarna County, Sweden with 368 inhabitants in 2010.
