= Småbönders =

Småbönders Vähätkylät
- Village
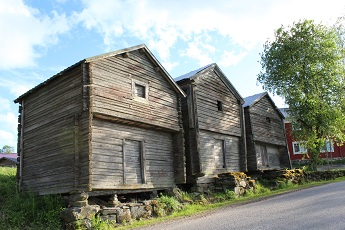
- Granaries in Småbönders

- Location in Ostrobothnia
- Coordinates: 63.430°N 23.601°E
- Country: Finland
- Region: Ostrobothnia
- Sub-region: Jakobstad sub-region
- Municipality: Kronoby
- Former municipality: Terjärv
- Time zone: UTC+2 (EET)
  - Summer (DST): UTC+3 (EEST)

Småbönders (Finnish: Vähätkylät) is a village in Terjärv, Kronoby, Finland. It is located in the southernmost part of Terjärv on a wedge between the municipalities of Evijärvi and Veteli, and is the furthest-inland Swedish-speaking village in Finland. The river Påras å (Porasenjoki) flows through the village. Sections of Småbönders include Furu, Haltas, Kvarnbacka, Långbacka, Manderbacka, Myngels, Papas and Vistbacka.

Småbönders was settled in the early 17th century. The name of the village is derived from the word småbönderna 'smallholders', as its farms were historically smaller than those in other parts of Terjärv. While the standard Finnish name for the village is Vähätkylät (lit. 'small villages'), neighboring Finnish-speakers call it Pönteri, derived from the Swedish name.

The regional council of Ostrobothnia chose Småbönders as the regional village of the year in 2008.

Småbönders had its own school until 2018, when it was closed and its students were relocated to the school in central Terjärv.
