= Oskar Öholm =

Swedish politician (born 1980)

- Öholm in 2024
- Born: Erik Oskar Siewert Öholm; 3 February 1980 (age 46); Falun, Sweden
- Occupation: Politician
- Political party: Moderate Party
- Father: Siewert Öholm

Erik Oskar Siewert Öholm, (born 3 February 1980) is a Swedish politician for the Moderate Party. He is a suppleant for the National banks board, and an MP in the Riksdagen between 2006 and 2014. He is the son of television presenter and journalist Siewert Öholm. His mother Ann-Britt Öholm died of breast cancer in November 2004.
