= Terjärv =

Terjärv Terjärv – Teerijärvi
- Former Municipality
- Terjärv kommun Teerijärven kunta
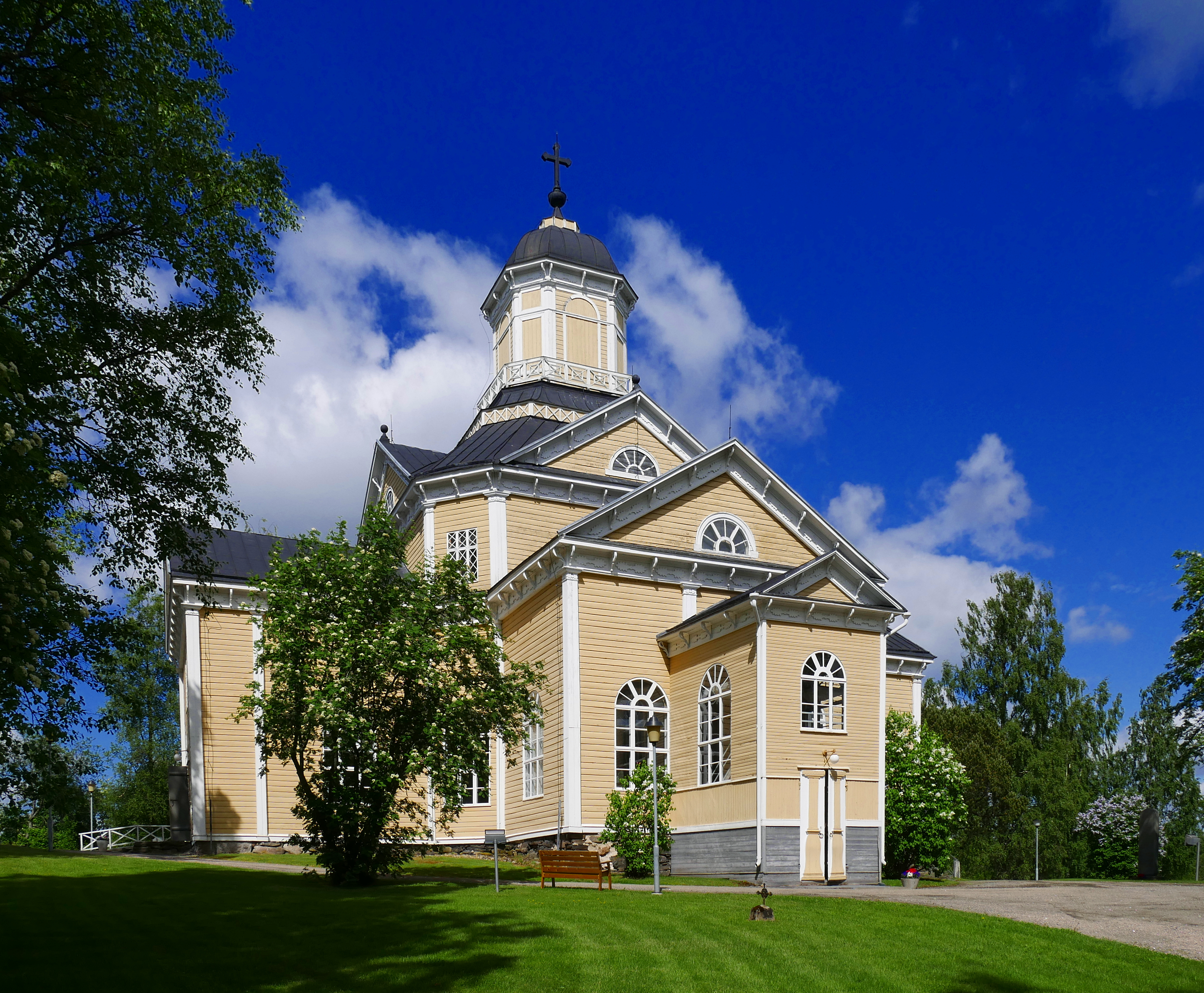
- Church in Terjärv

- Coat of arms
- Motto: Tärjä best i vädä
- Interactive map of Terjärv
- Coordinates: 63.55°N 23.51°E
- Country: Finland
- Region: Ostrobothnia
- Sub-region: Kyrkbyn, Hästbacka, Kortjärvi
- Charter: 1542
  - Density: 0/km^{2} (0/sq mi)
- Time zone: UTC+02:00 (EET)
  - Summer (DST): UTC+03:00 (EEST)

Terjärv (Finnish: Teerijärvi; [ˈteːriˌjærʋi]) is a former municipality of Finland, since 1969 part of Kronoby.

Terjärv is located in the province of Western Finland and is part of the Ostrobothnia region. The ex-municipality has a population of about 2,400.

The former municipality is bilingual, with a large majority Swedish-speaking and the minority Finnish. Being 43 kilometres (27 mi) by air from port city Jakobstad at the nearest coastline, the central village is among the further inland settlements of Swedish-speaking Finland. The village of Vistbacka within the former municipality is even further inland at 54 kilometres (34 mi) from Jakobstad, which makes it the furthest inland settlement where Swedish is the dominant language. Terjärv is known as 'The Pearl Of Ostrobothnia' for the exceptionally nice nature for the region, with rolling hills and numerous lakes along the river running through Terjärv.

Kokkola-Pietarsaari Airport is located in Kronoby close to Terjärv.

== Villages in Terjärv ==
Terjärv have 3 main villages; Kyrkoby, Hästbacka, and Kortjärv. Inside these main villages are smaller villages. The largest of these is Småbönders in the southeast. Others are Högnabba, Djupsjöbacka, Kortjärvi, Dövnäs, Kolam, Emet and Drycksbäck. There are also places like Särs-Backman or Skogsbyn, Klubbi, Granö, Skullbacka, Nabba, Sågslamp, Kaitås, Emas, Lotas, Peckas, Sandvik, Grannabba, Långbacka, Lytz, Vistä, Furu, Svartsjö, Myngels, Manderbacka, that cannot be called villages but are boroughs of some of the main villages.

=== Villages ===
- sv:Djupsjöbacka
- sv:Högnabba
- sv:Kortjärvi
- Småbönders
