= Battle of Brunnbäck Ferry =

1521 battle of the Swedish War of Liberation

Coordinates: 60°7′53″N 16°15′12″E

- Part of Swedish War of Liberation
Date	Early April, 1521
Location	Brunnbäck, near Krylbo, Sweden
Result	Swedish victory

Belligerents
Sweden	Kalmar Union; Denmark; Norway

Commanders and leaders
Peder Svensson	Henrik Slagheck; Henrik von Mehlen; Berend von Mehlen

Strength
800 to 1,000	1,000 to 1,500

Casualties and losses
Unknown	Heavy

The Battle of Brunnbäck Ferry (Swedish: Slaget vid Brunnbäcks färja) was the first major battle in the Swedish War of Liberation, between rebels rallied by Gustav Vasa that had marched down from occupied Falun and Danish troops from Västerås. The battle took place by the village Brunnbäck, near the ferry over Dalälven.

Union troops led by Henrik Slagheck, the brother of Didrik Slagheck, marched from Västerås to Dalälven, making camp near the Brunnbäck ferry. Shortly afterwards rebel troops under Peder Svensson arrived on the opposite side of the river. The rebels engaged the Danish soldiers by archery, causing many casualties and forcing the enemy to retreat. By then, Peder Svensson had already taken part of his force, and out of sight moved it over the river.

When the Danes left their camp he attacked, while the remaining rebels moved over the river. The battle took place on an open area called Sonnbohed. The governmental troops resisted, but the attack was both surprising and fierce. Those who were not cut down fled either by throwing themselves into the river or on the main road, the latter being chased far into Västmanland. The battle ended as a major Swedish victory.

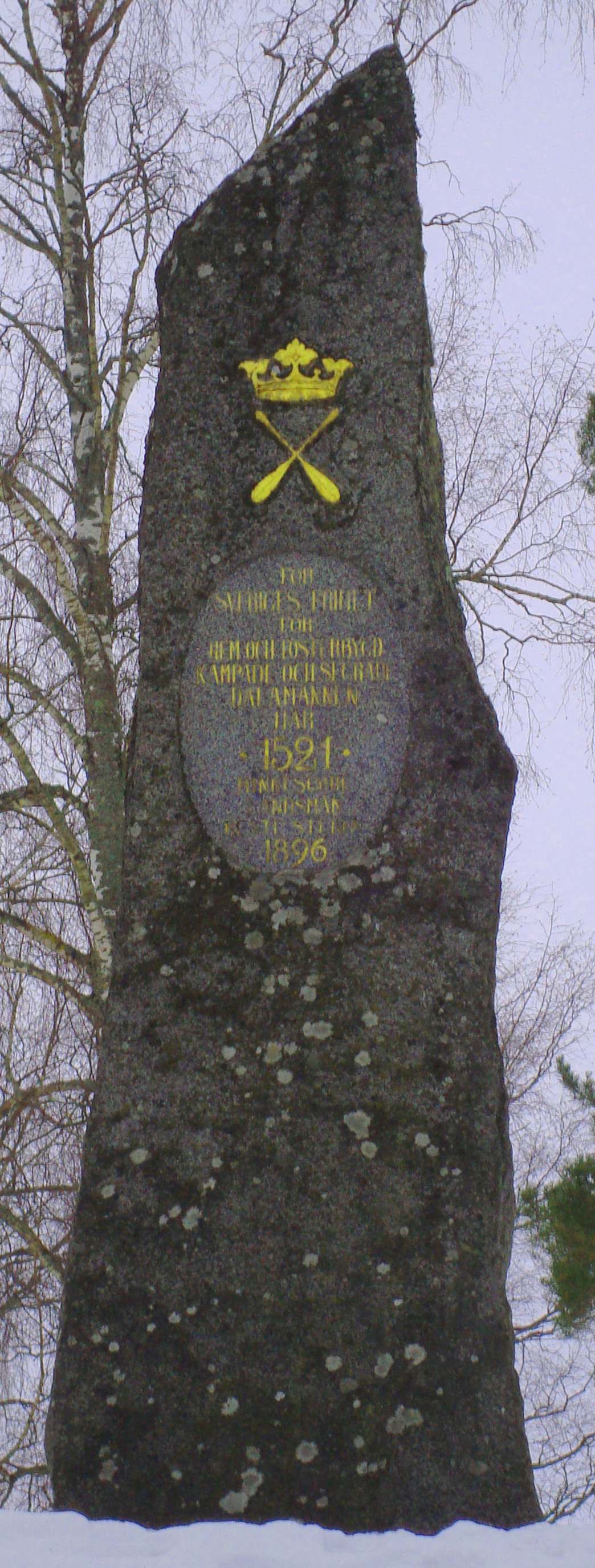
Memorial of the battle, in Brunnbäck.

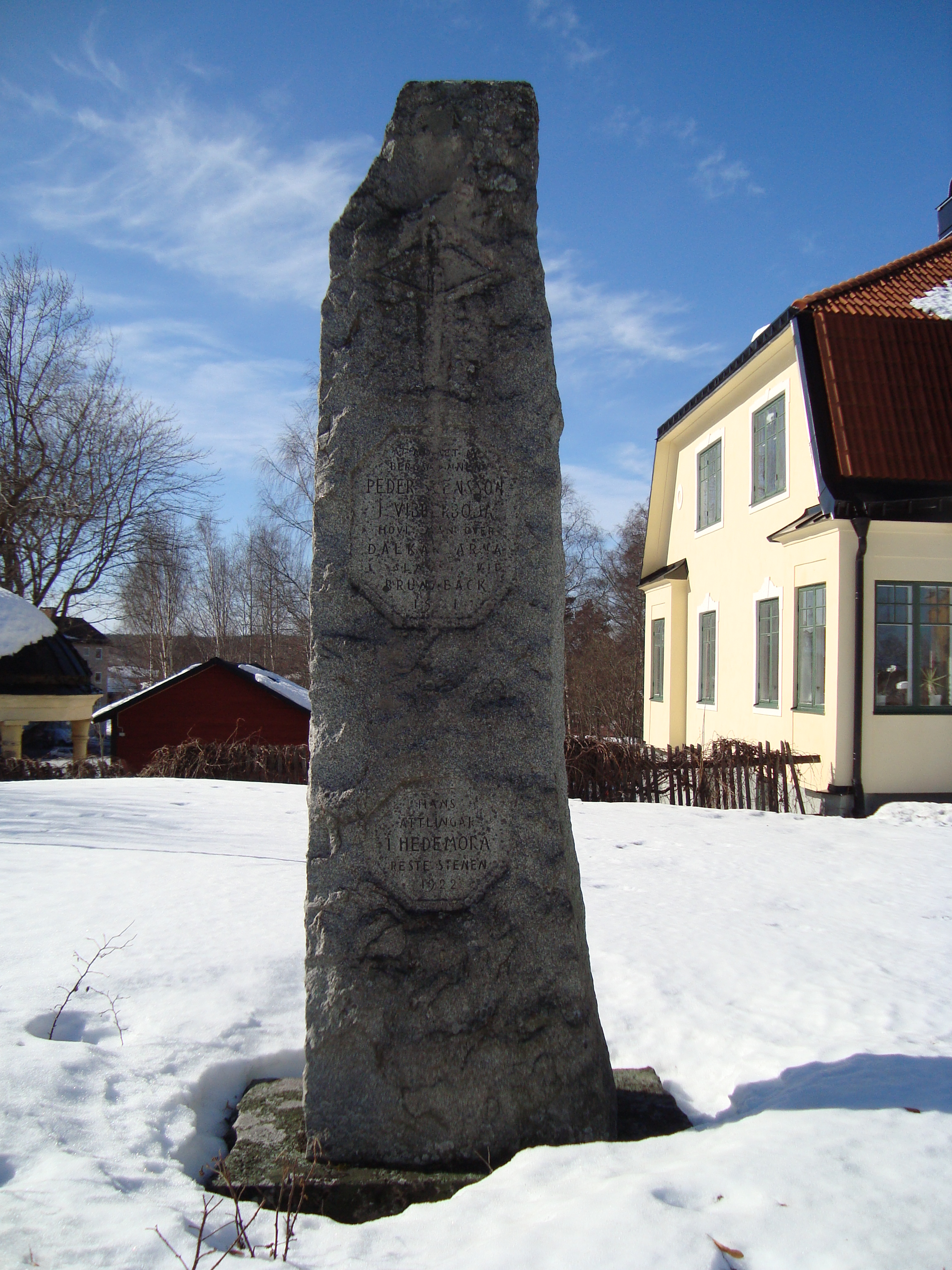
Memorial of Peder Svensson, in Hedemora.
