= Ishozi =

- Location in Tanzania
- Coordinates: 01°09′00″S 31°45′54″E
- Country: Tanzania
- Region: Kagera Region
- Elevation: 4,300 ft (1,300 m)
- Time zone: UTC+3 (East Africa Time )

Ishozi is a small town in the Kagera Region, in northwestern Tanzania, not far from the shores of Lake Victoria.

== Location ==
The town is located approximately 24.5 kilometres (15.2 mi), by road, north of Bukoba, the regional capital. The coordinates of the town are:01 09 00S, 31 45 54E (Latitude:-1.1500; Longitude:31.7650).

== Population ==
The exact population of Ishozi is unknown.

== See also ==
- Kagera Region
