= Husby, Hedemora =

Husby
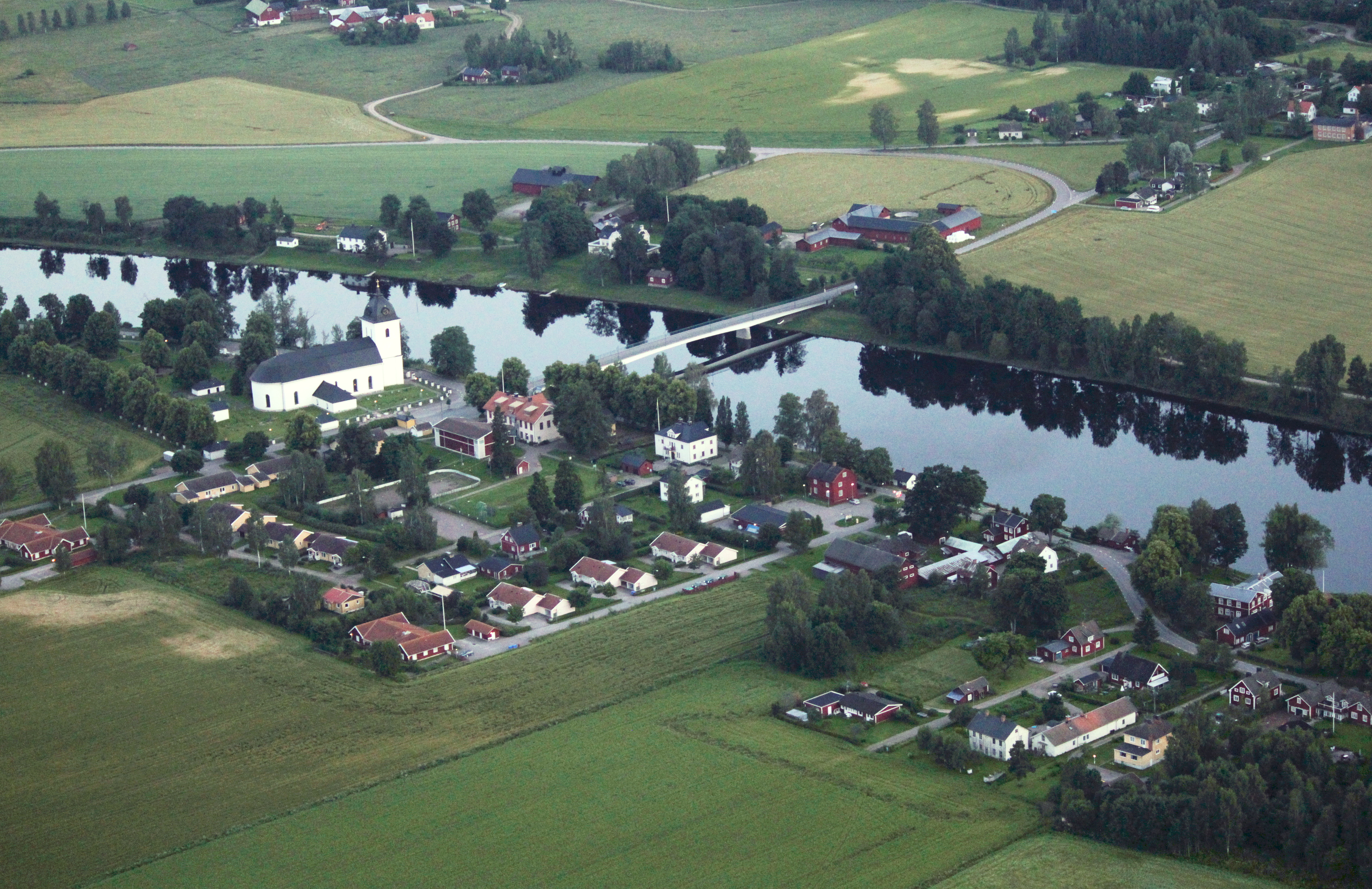
- Husby in Hedemora

- Location within Dalarna Location within Sweden
- Coordinates: 60°23′N 16°00′E
- Country: Sweden
- Province: Dalarna
- County: Dalarna County
- Municipality: Hedemora Municipality

Area
  - Total: 0.70 km^{2} (0.27 sq mi)

Population (31 December 2010)
  - Total: 256
  - Density: 364/km^{2} (940/sq mi)
- Time zone: UTC+1 (CET)
  - Summer (DST): UTC+2 (CEST)

Husby is a locality situated in Hedemora Municipality, Dalarna County, Sweden.

== History ==
The village of Husby had a population of 256 inhabitants in 2010. It is the site of Husby Church (Husby kyrka). It is also the location of the historic manor houses, Husby kungsgård and Näs kungsgård which are on the Husbyringen cultural trail.

Husby Church dates from the first half of the 13th century, but gained much of its present form at the time of an extension in 1779–1782.

Husby kungsgård was a former royal estate dating into the 13th century. The current building was designed in the early 18th century.

Näs kungsgård was designed in 1686 by Erik Dahlbergh (1625–1703). It served as the headquarters of the Dalarna Regiment (Dalregementet) from 1683–1813.

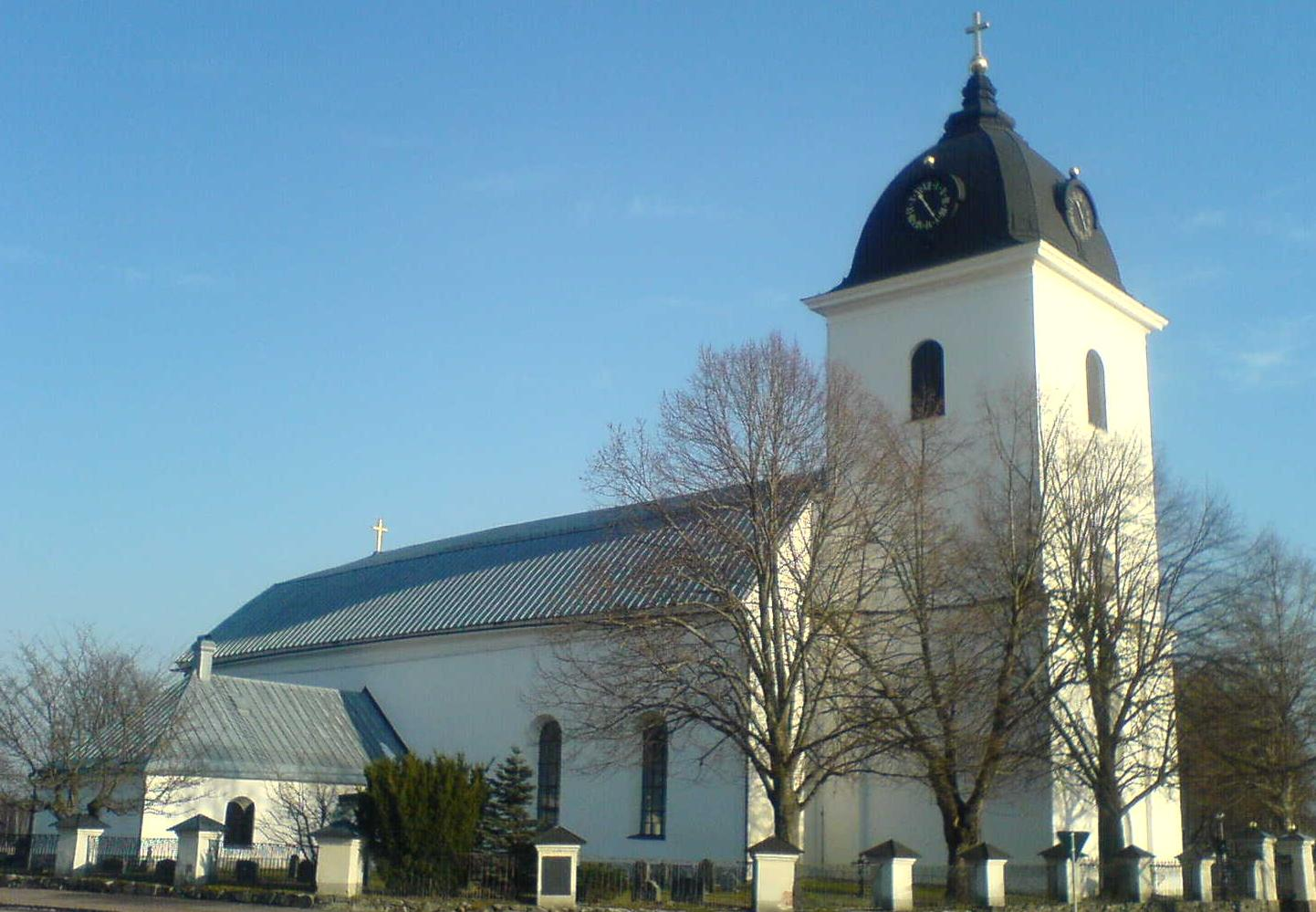
Husby Church

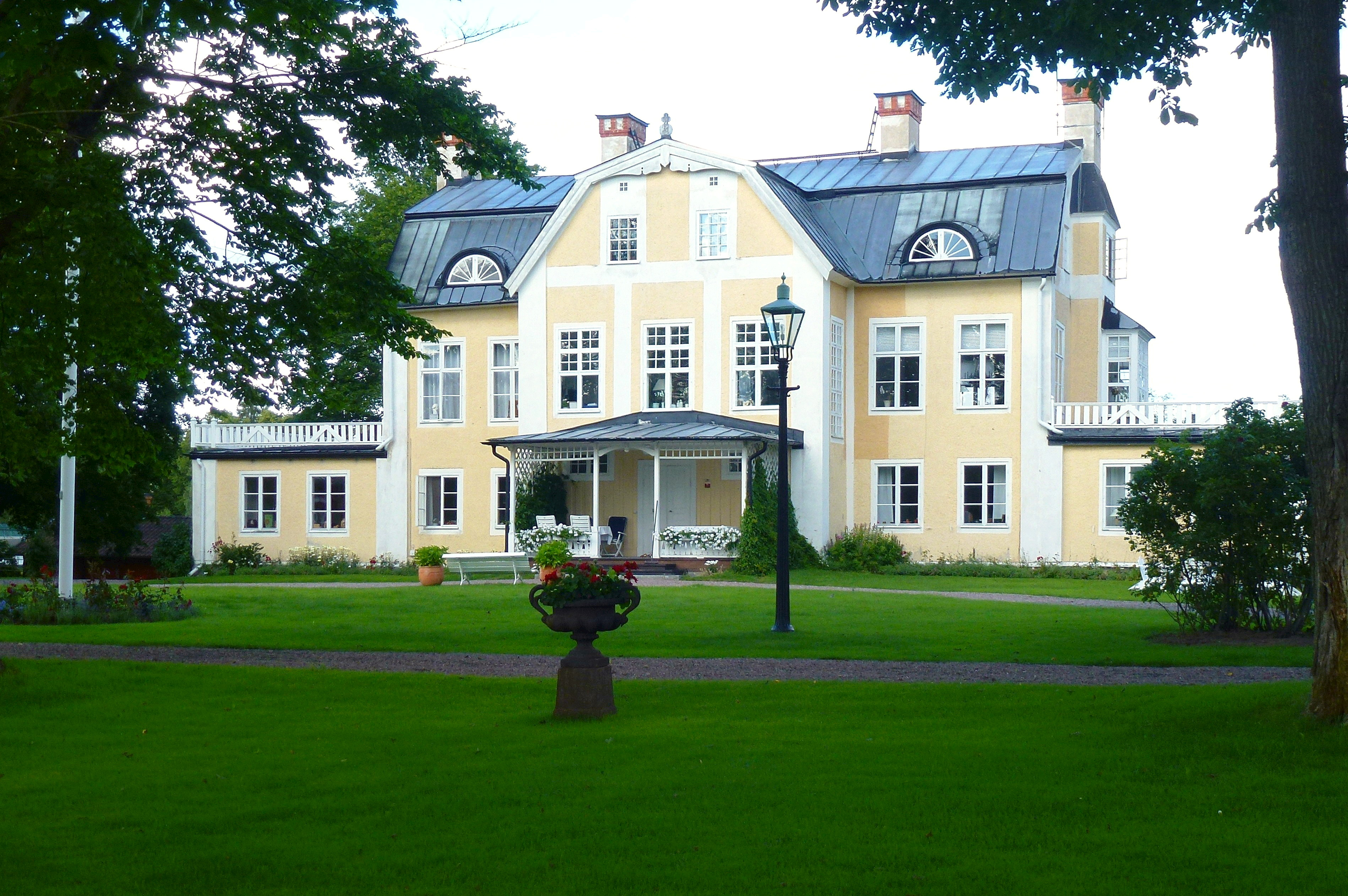
Husby kungsgård

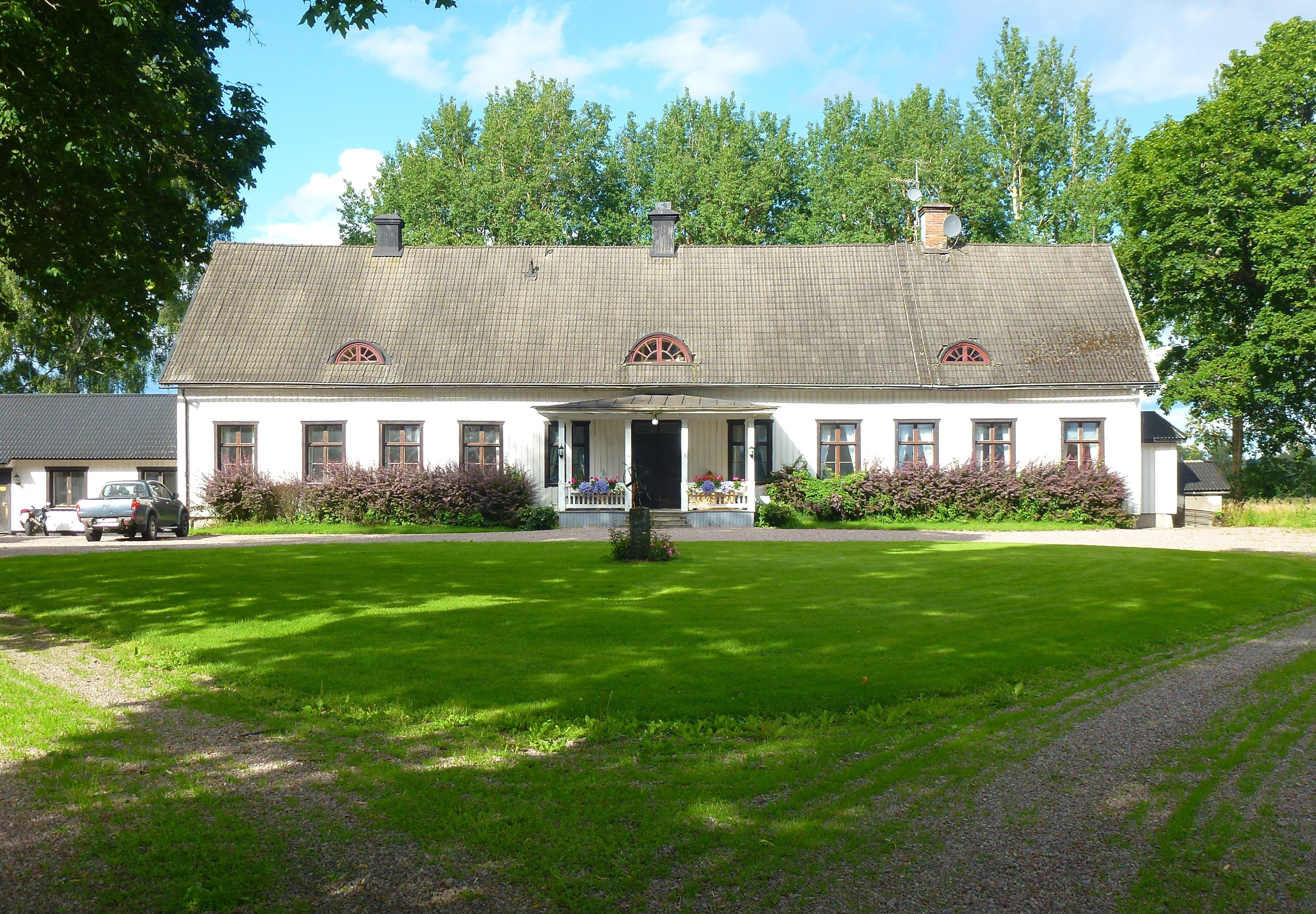
Näs kungsgård

== Sports ==
The following sports clubs are located in Husby:

- Husby AIK
