= Peder Svensson =

Swedish chieftain (c. 1470 – before 1547)

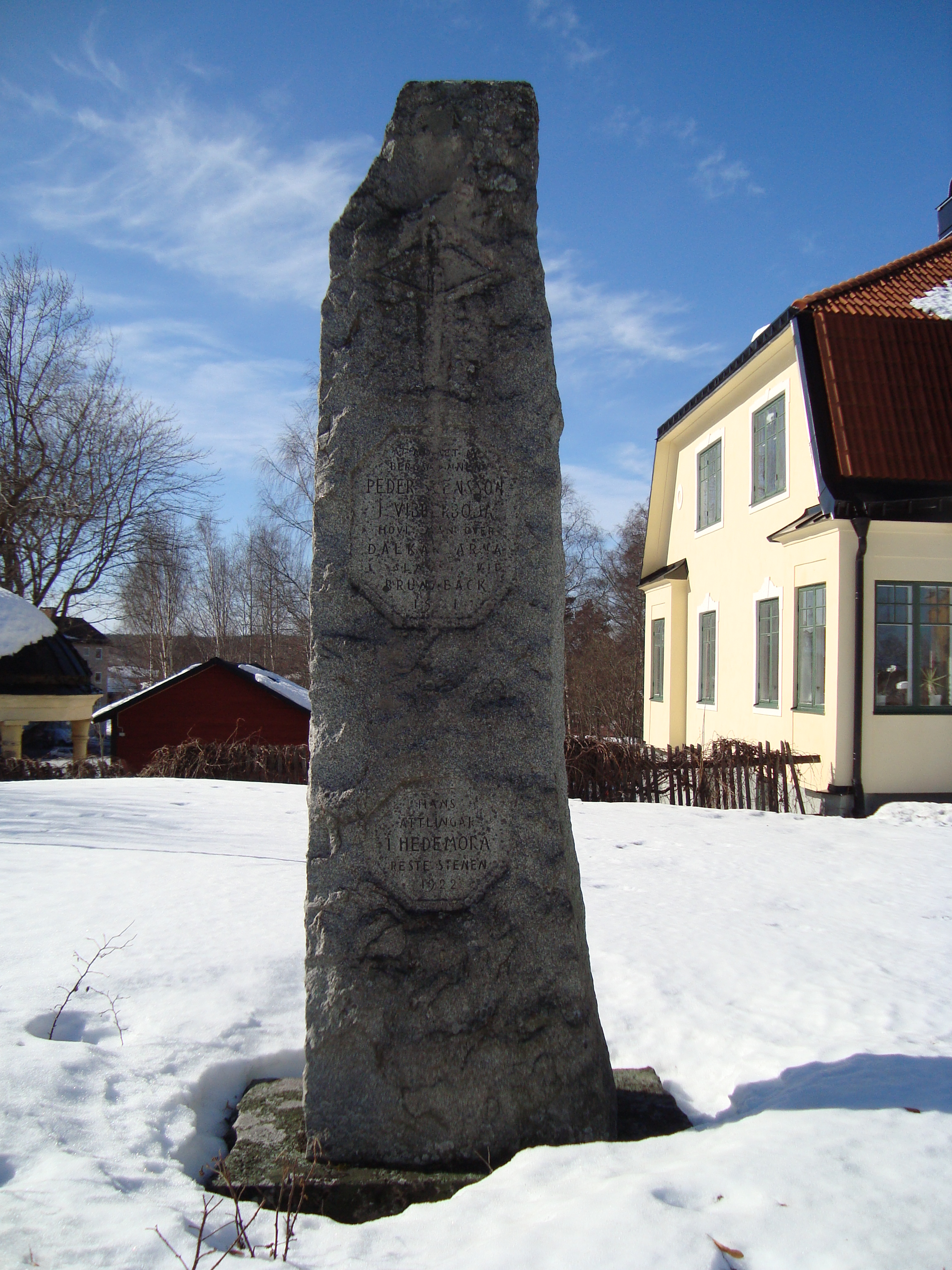
- Memorial at Hedemora
- Born: c 1470; Sweden
- Died: before 1547; Sweden
- Occupations: Bergsman, chieftain
- Known for: Commander at the Battle of Brunnbäck Ferry

Peder Svensson of Vibberboda (sometimes Peter Svensson), was a Swedish chieftain over Dalarna who supported Gustaf Vasa during the Swedish War of Liberation.

== Biography ==
Peder was born about 1470, and was probably a bergsman (mountain man) from Falun. He was a Sturepartiet when Svante Nilsson was regent of Sweden. Peder was bailiff at Garpeberget and also held the same post under Sten Sture the Younger. He joined Gustav Vasa's War of Liberation, and during Gustav Vasa's journey to Hälsingland, Peder took command of the rebel army and led it at the Battle of Brunnbäck's Ferry. However, he is not mentioned further during the civil war.

He also supported Vasa in 1527 when the Daljunker traveled around Dalarna to recruit people during the Dalecarlian rebellions. He died before 1547.

== Memorial ==
A memorial to Peder was erected in Hedemora in 1922.
