= Battle of El Tor =

Ottoman-Portuguese battle (1541)

- Part of Ottoman–Portuguese conflicts (1538–1559)
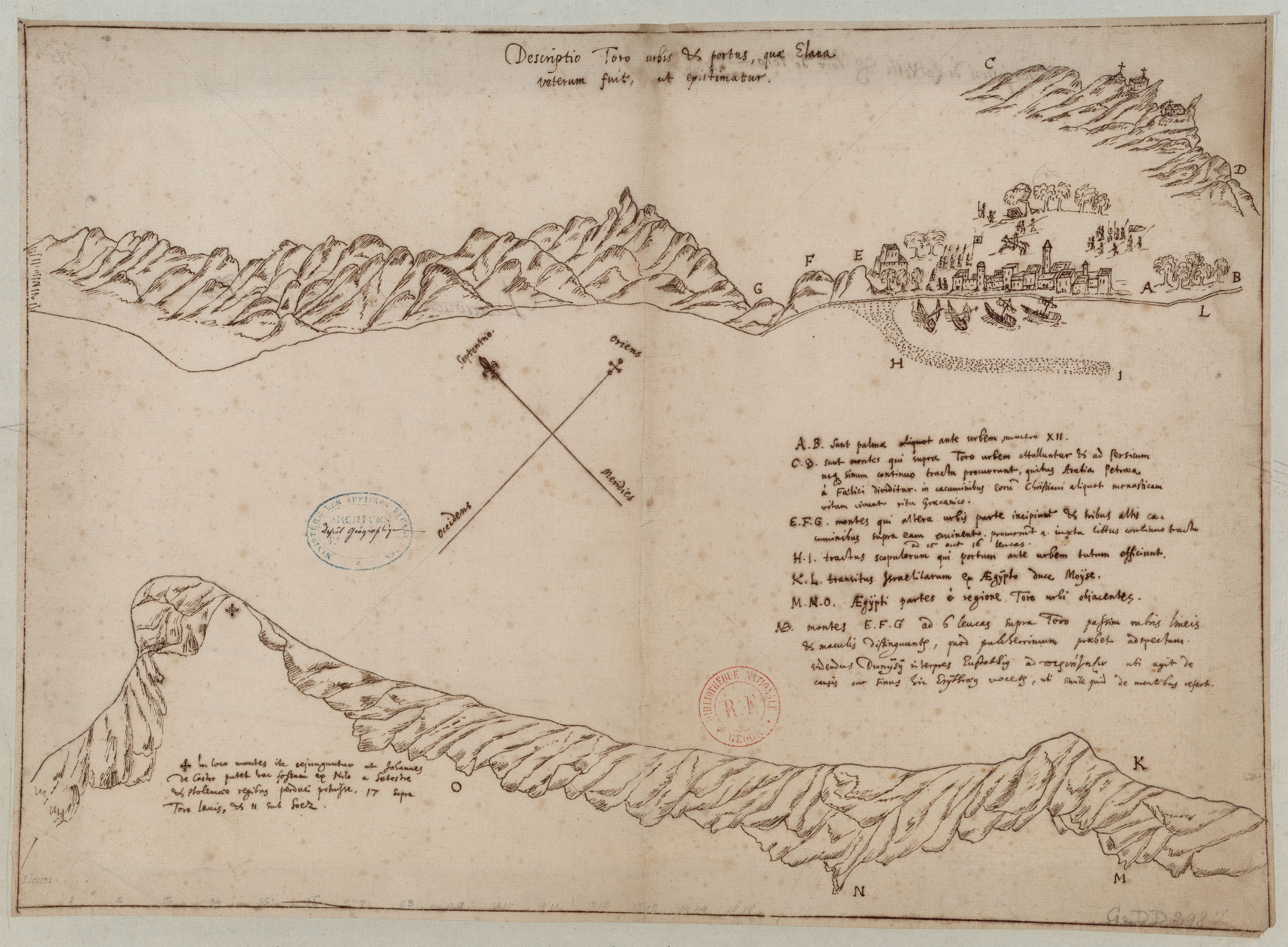
- 16th century Portuguese sketch of Toro
Date	1541
Location	El Tor
Result	Portuguese victory

Belligerents
Portuguese Empire	Ottoman Empire

Commanders and leaders
Dom Estevão da Gama; Dom Cristóvão da Gama; Dom Luís de Ataíde; Dom João de Castro	Unknown

Strength
255 soldiers 17 oarships	200 horsemen

Casualties and losses
3 wounded	Over 20 dead

The Battle of El Tor was a military engagement that took place in 1541, between Portuguese forces under the command of the Governor of India Dom Estevão da Gama and those of the Ottoman Empire then in the city of El Tor, on the Sinai Peninsula. The Turks were driven from the city, but at the request of Christian monks from the Monastery of Saint Catherine the Portuguese spared the city from being plundered, and celebrated a mass and a knighting ceremony therein.

It is among the most celebrated episodes of the history of Portugal, and considered one of the greatest achievements of chivalry of history; the event was later celebrated across Europe.

== Context ==
In 1538, the Ottoman Empire had sailed a large armada to India and sieged the Portuguese fortress of Diu in Gujarat, but failing to take it, returned to Egypt. Two years later, the Portuguese Governor of India Dom Estevão da Gama assembled a fleet of 80 ships to undertake a retaliatory campaign against the Ottomans within the Red Sea, as far as Suez. Along the way they called at Massawa, sacked Suakin and Qoseir before they headed towards El Tor, on the west coast of the Sinai Peninsula. Most of the Portuguese fleet was ordered to return after Suakin loaded with spoil while Dom Estevão proceeded with a small strike force.

Aware that there were Christians residing at El Tor, Dom Estevão sought to capture the town and obtain information regarding Ottoman forces at the port of Suez.

== Battle of El Tor ==
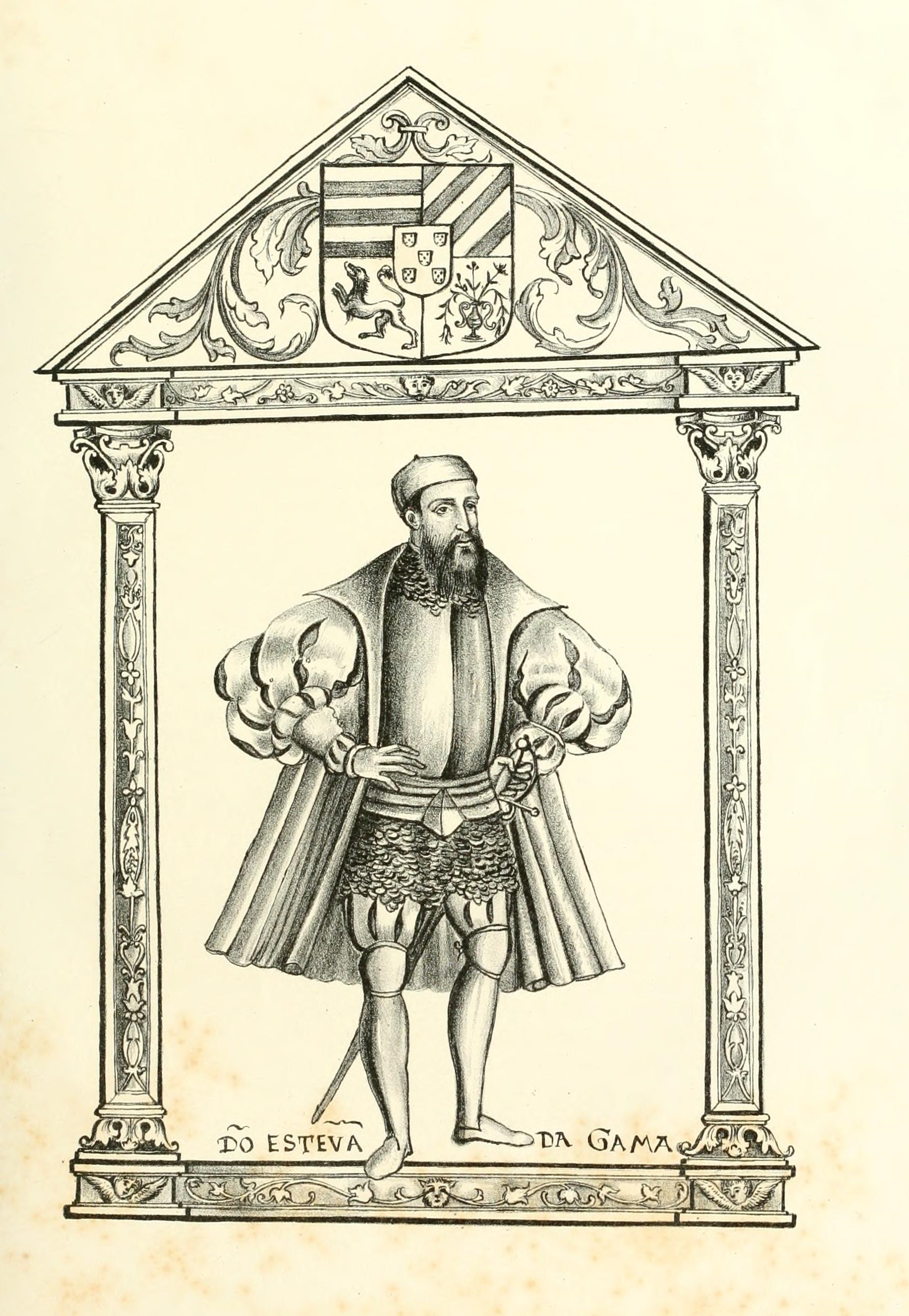
Dom Estevão da Gama, depicted by Gaspar Correia

As the Portuguese approached the beaches on boats seeking to land, they were confronted by a squadron of 200 mounted Turkish gunners that appeared from the city, shouting and flying white and green banners. The Portuguese came under fire immediately upon approaching the shore, but Dom Cristóvão pressed on and ordered a volley of arquebus fire that killed 20 and forced the rest to retreat. He then landed with a squadron of Portuguese infantry, and pressed on to the city, which was breached, causing the remaining garrison and most inhabitants to abandon the settlement. As the Portuguese were about to sack it, the fidalgo Tristão de Ataíde at the head of a squadron of infantry was confronted by two Greek monks, who pleaded with the Portuguese to spare the city. The monks were taken to Dom Estevão, who received them with tears of joy and ordered that fighting cease immediately.

=== Mass and knighting ceremony at El Tor ===
With the attack halted, the Portuguese were led into the church of a Christian monastery at El Tor in a procession, at the sound of psalms that the friars sung "in their fashion", the Portuguese taking a banner with the Cross of the Order of Christ. They were met at the door by twelve other monks who bore a wooden cross inlaid in silver. Among other things, the monks were given by the Portuguese commander a banner made in white and green damask, bearing a Cross of the Order of Christ on one side and the arms of Portugal on the other.

The novelty of the campaign, and the strangeness of the land and place, and the neighborhood of the glorious Virgin and Martyr Catherine thus led most of the fidalgos present to ask the Governor the honor and order of knighthood, which is usually asked under circumstances of great risk and renown; because in truth this was one of them.

— Luiz de Sousa in Anais de El-Rei Dom João III

The ceremony was undertaken in the chapel of the monastery at El Tor. Among the knighted was Dom Luís de Ataíde, who would travel to the Holy Roman Empire and fight with distinction in the service of Emperor Charles V at the Battle of Muhlberg, and later serve as Viceroy of India.

Governor Estevão da Gama would die in 1576 at the age of 71 or 72, and upon his tomb an epitaph was engraved that stated: "Here lies Dom Estevão da Gama, who armed knights at the foot of Mount Sinai".

== See also ==
- Battle of Suakin (1541)
- Battle of Suez (1541)
- Portuguese India
