= Battle of the Hill of the Jews =

Battle during the Ethiopian-Adal War

- Part of the Ethiopian–Adal War and Somali-Portuguese conflicts
Date	August 1542
Location	Hill of the Jews, Ethiopia
Result	Portuguese victory

Belligerents
Portuguese Empire	Adal Sultanate

Commanders and leaders
(Portuguese Empire) Cristóvão da Gama	Unknown

Strength
Unknown	Unknown

Casualties and losses
Unknown	Unknown

The Battle of the Hill of the Jews (named by Miguel de Castanhoso for a community of Beta Israel who lived there) was fought in Ethiopia in August 1542 between the Portuguese forces of Cristóvão da Gama and the Adal Sultanate. The Portuguese won the battle, capturing many horses that they could have used to exploit their victory in the previous battle of Jarte.

The benefits of this victory were short-lived, for within the month, da Gama was captured and slain in Wofla by Ahmed Ibn Ibrahim, even before his soldiers escorting the captured animals could reach the Portuguese encampment at Lake Ashenge.

The location of this battle is not known. R.S. Whiteway has argued that this place is identical with Amba Geshen, located far to the south of the Portuguese camp. More recently, however, C.F. Beckingham has argued that the battle took place in the eastern Semien Mountains, near the left bank of the Tekezé River.
