= Attack on Jeddah (1541) =

1541 battle

- Part of Ottoman–Portuguese conflicts (1538–1560)
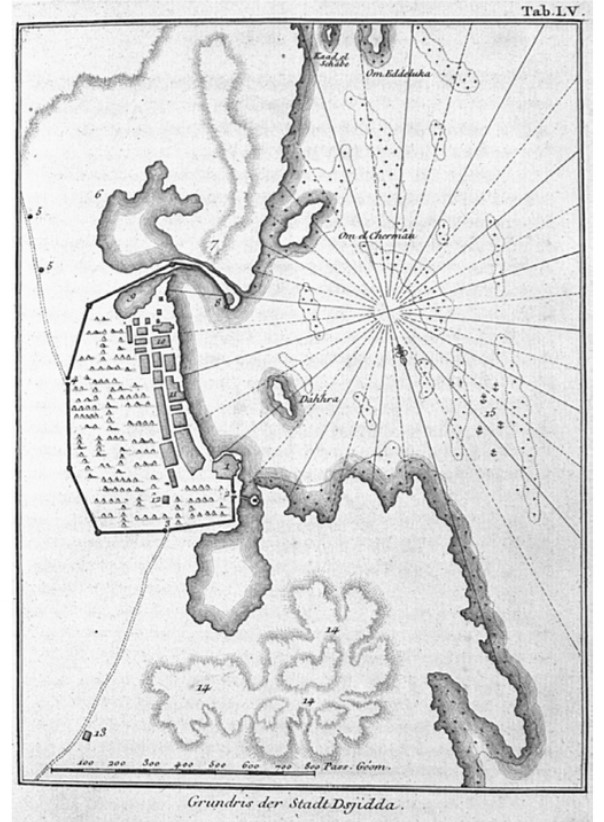
- map of Jeddah harbor and defenses, the Portuguese failed to capture the city due to strong defenses and heavy resistance
Date	1541
Location	Jeddah, Arabia and the Red Sea
Result	Ottoman–Meccan victory

Belligerents
(Kingdom of Portugal) Portugal	Ottoman Empire; Sharifate of Mecca

Commanders and leaders
(Kingdom of Portugal) Estêvão da Gama	Ali Beg; Sharif Abu Numayy

Strength
85 ships	Unknown Ottoman Garrison; Large number of Meccan troops

The Attack on Jeddah occurred in 1541 and was the last attempt by the Portuguese to capture the city.

The Portuguese had previously attempted to capture Jeddah from the Ottomans in 1517, but were defeated. In 1541, the Portuguese fleet under the command of the Portuguese governor of India Estêvão da Gama penetrated into the Red Sea with the aim of destroying the Ottoman fleet in Suez. The Portuguese destroyed several ports in their way, including Suakin. Led by Estêvão da Gama, the Portuguese attacked Jeddah and attempted to take the city with a fleet consisting of 85 ships and landed in a port called Abu AI-Dawa'ir near Jeddah. The Ottoman garrison at that time was led by Ali Beg.

Upon hearing about the arrival of the Portuguese, Abu Numayy called for jihad in Mecca, and many answered the call. Abu Numayy led the Meccan troops to support the Ottoman garrison and expel the Portuguese. The joint Ottoman-Meccan force led by Ali Beg and Abu Numayy successfully fended off the Portuguese attack, and Jeddah was successfully defended. Abu Numayy was rewarded for his successful resistance by Sultan Suleiman the Magnificent, who granted him half of the fees collected at Jeddah.

== See also ==
- Siege of Jeddah
- Battle of Suakin (1541)
- Battle of Suez (1541)
