= Oman–Somalia relations =

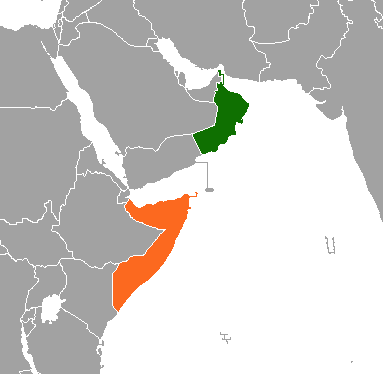

- Oman: Somalia

Oman–Somalia relations refer to foreign relations between Oman and Somalia. Both nations are Arab League & Organisation of Islamic Cooperation members and maintain relations. The two nations enjoy a large degree of cultural similarities and share maritime borders in the Arabian Sea.

== History ==
In the Middle Ages, the Somali Sultanates (most prominently the Ajuran Sultanate and the Adal Sultanate) and the Omani Empire were both locked in conflicts with European maritime empires, particularly the Portuguese incursions into the Gulf of Oman and the Somali–Portuguese conflicts that occurred in similar timeframes. Both Oman and Somalia were major hubs of maritime trade and were notable stops on classical Silk Road, and that Dhofar, Muscat and Mogadishu were both covered in the travels of Maghrebi (modern day Moroccan) traveller and adventurer Ibn Battuta.

The Somali states at the time also had good relations with the Sultanate of Zanzibar, which was ruled by a branch of the Al Bu Said dynasty.

In the modern period, Oman came under the British sphere of influence in the Persian Gulf whereas Somalia was divided by Italy and Britain, Somalia was granted independence in 1960 and Oman asserted its sovereignty in 1970 (despite having been a nominally independent state long prior).

Notably, both Somalia and Oman underwent coups, first Somalia in 1969 and Oman in 1970. Despite the communist rhetoric of the Somali Democratic Republic, Somalia was one of the few communist states that Oman had good relations with due to Somalia's refusal to support the communist guerilla war in Dhofar and increasing suspicion of the Soviet Union's satellite state in Southern Arabia, South Yemen which would lead both Oman and Somalia to materially support North Yemen. Increasing through the late 1970s and beyond, Oman and Somalia enjoyed an enhanced relationship so much so that in 1984, Sultan Qaboos signed Royal Decree 74/84 which is the air transport agreement to establish direct air connectivity between the two nations, strengthen economic and cultural exchanges and to facilitate trade, travel, and diplomatic missions.

Oman provided extensive aid to Somalia after the collapse of the Somali government in 1991.

Today, both nations enjoy friendly relations where Somalia maintains an embassy in Muscat whereas Oman is slated to reopen their embassy in Mogadishu.

== See also ==
- Foreign relations of Oman
- Foreign relations of Somalia
