= Battle of Suez (1541) =

Failed attack by the Portuguese against the Ottomans

- Part of the Ottoman–Portuguese conflicts (1538–1559)
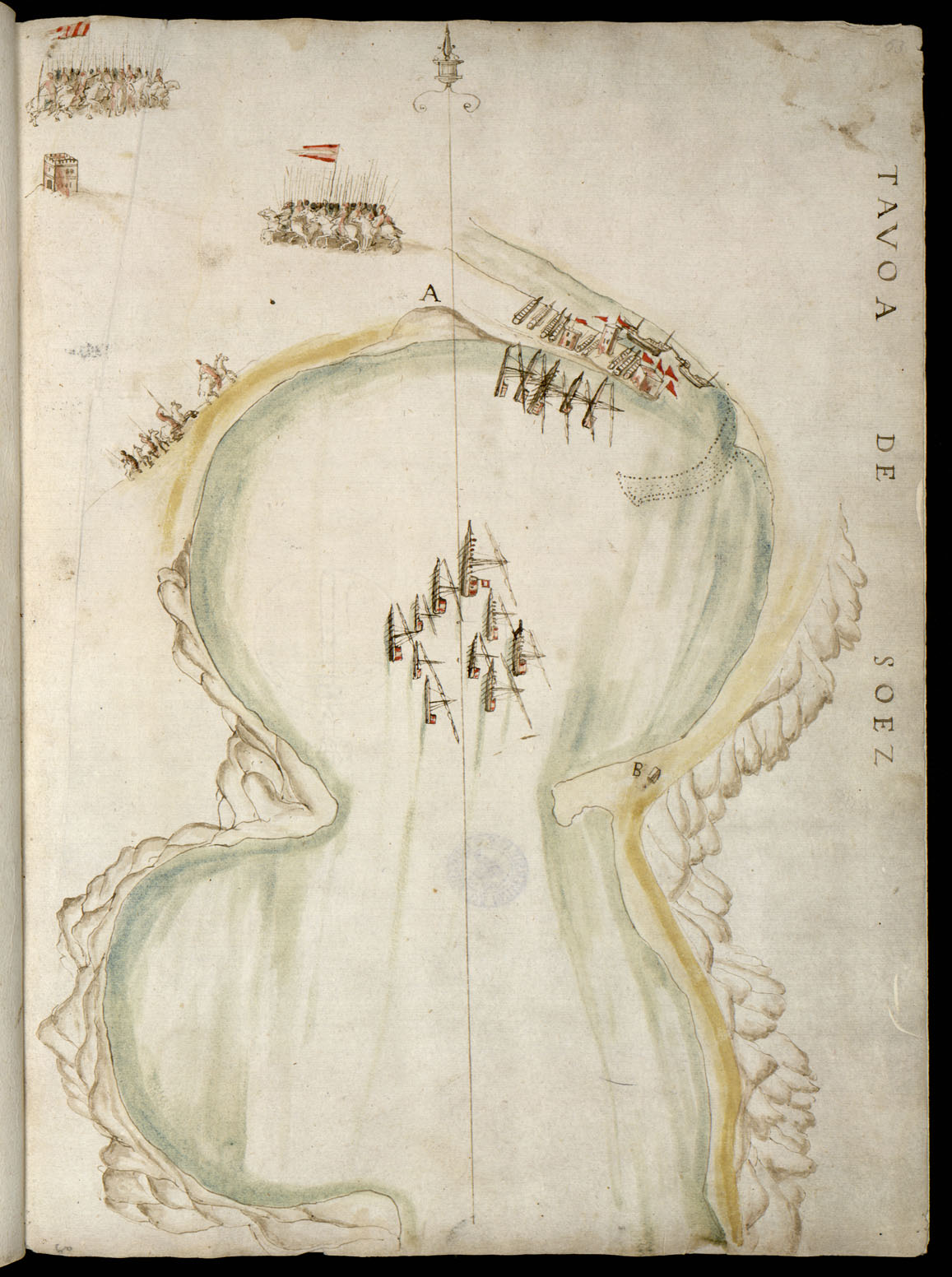
- Portuguese fleet in Suez 1541
Date	26 April 1541
Location	Suez, Egypt 29°58′N 32°33′E
Result	Ottoman victory

Belligerents
Portuguese Empire	Ottoman Empire

Commanders and leaders
Estêvão da Gama; Cristóvão da Gama	Davud Pasha

Strength
16 warships 250 soldiers	2,000 horsemen

Casualties and losses
Unknown	Unknown

The Battle of Suez occurred in 1541 and was a failed attack by the Portuguese against the Ottomans.

In 1541 the Portuguese fleet under the command of the Portuguese governor of India Estêvão da Gama and his brother Cristóvão da Gama penetrated into the Red Sea. The Portuguese fleet consisted of 80 ships and 2,300 soldiers. After sacking Suakin, the governor detached 16 light oarvessels and 250 picked men. The aim was to attack Suez but the attack was a failure as the heavy defence as well as the opposition of Davud Pasha and the Ottoman artillery forced the Portuguese to retreat. A few retreating Portuguese forces which landed at Massawa would be ambushed by the Adal Sultanate at the Battle of Massawa in the same year.

For the duration of the 1541 Suez campaign, the Portuguese remained within the Red Sea for seven months, never being confronted by the Ottoman navy, while Muslim trade was paralysed.

== See also ==
- Battle of Suakin (1541)
- Battle of El Tor
- Attack on Jeddah (1541)
