= Battle of Wofla =

1542 battle of the Ottoman–Portuguese conflicts (1538–57)

- Part of Ethiopian–Adal War and Somali–Portuguese conflicts
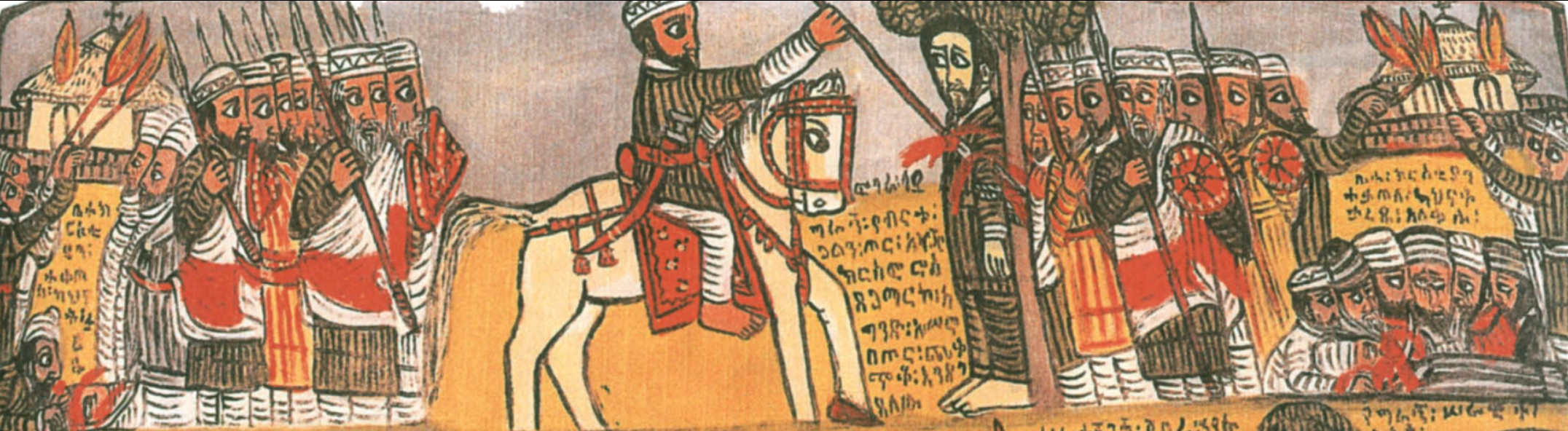
- The execution of Cristóvão da Gama by Ahmad ibn Ibrahim
Date	August 28, 1542
Location	Modern day Ofla, Ethiopia
Result	Adalite-Ottoman victory

Belligerents
Adal Sultanate; Ottoman Empire	Portuguese Empire; Ethiopian Empire

Commanders and leaders
Ahmad ibn Ibrahim al-Ghazi	(Portuguese Empire) Cristóvão da Gama (executed)

Strength
2,900 arquebusiers (2,000 from Arabia and 900 from the Ottomans)	400 Portuguese arquebusiers

Casualties and losses
Unknown	200 killed 50 missing

The Battle of Wofla was fought on August 28, 1542, near Lake Ashenge in Wofla (Ofla) between the Portuguese under Cristóvão da Gama and the forces of Imam Ahmad ibn Ibrahim al-Ghazi. Reinforced with a superiority not only in numbers but in firearms, Imam Ahmad was victorious and forced the Portuguese, along with Queen Seble Wongel and her retinue, to flee their fortified encampment and leave their weapons behind.

Whilst fleeing the battlefield with 14 soldiers, da Gama, whose arm was broken from a bullet wound, was captured that night by followers of Imam Ahmad, who had been guided into the bush in which they had taken refuge by an old woman. However, Makkham claims that Gama had stayed behind to look for a woman he had captured at the Battle of the Hill of the Jews with whom he became infatuated. Nonetheless, he was then brought into the presence of the Imam Ahmad, who tortured and executed his captured opponent.

A quarrel now broke out between Ahmed Ibrahim and his Ottoman musketeers after their victory over the handling of the Portuguese captured in the battle. The Ottomans wanted to use these prisoners as a negotiating tool in their ongoing talks with Lisbon, therefore they made the demand that they should be delivered unharmed into the care of Yemeni provincial officials. However, Ahmed turned down this request and killed da Gama with his own hands just hours after capturing him. Furious, the Ottoman commander deserted Ahmed and headed back to Yemen with the majority of his forces.

Following the death of da Gama and the majority of his soldiers being either captured or slain, the Portuguese were hesitant to make any investments in the area thus allowing the Adal Sultanate to expand its area of control in the Horn of Africa over the following year.
