= Somali–Portuguese conflicts =

1499–1543 military encounters

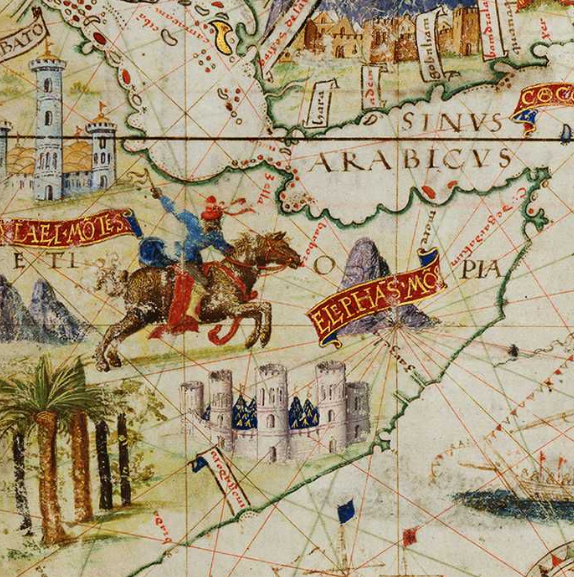
- The Horn of Africa depicted in a 16th century Portuguese map.
Date	1505–1543 (38 years)
Location	Horn of Africa

Belligerents
Portuguese Empire; Supported by: Ethiopian Empire; Kingdom of Malindi	Sultanate of Adal; Ajuran Sultanate; Supported by: Ottoman Empire

Commanders and leaders
Tristão da Cunha (WIA); Afonso de Albuquerque; Lopo Soares de Albergaria; João de Sepúlveda (WIA); António Correia †; Dom Cristóvão da Gama (executed); Gonçalo Vaz de Távora; Emperor Gelawdewos; Seble Wongel	Rasul ibn Ali; Ahmad ibn Ibrahim al-Ghazi †; Sayid Mehmed †

Somali–Portuguese conflicts refers to the armed engagements between Portuguese forces and Somali forces, namely those of the Adal Sultanate and the cities of Barawa and Mogadishu in the 16th century.

Portugal made a notable intervention in the Ethiopian–Adal War on the side of Christian Ethiopia and although Cristóvão da Gama, the commander of the Portuguese expeditionary corps was captured and executed for not converting to Islam, the remaining Portuguese continued on campaign and Ethiopia was ultimately defended successfully.

== Background ==
The first known Portuguese to come into contact with the Horn of Africa was king John IIs explorer and spy Pero da Covilhã. Covilhã landed at Zeila and made his way to Ethiopia, where he was forced to marry and settle for the rest of his life. It's not clear, however, whether he ever managed to transmit any knowledge back to Portugal.

Nevertheless, direct and official contact between Portugal and the Horn was only established by Vasco da Gama during his expedition to reach India from Europe directly by sea.

At the time, the Muslim Sultanate of Adal and the cities of Barawa (Brava in Portuguese) and Mogadishu (Mogadoxo in Portuguese) were among the states in east-Africa that were involved in the Indian Ocean trade network and their political, commercial and religious alignment with Mamluk Egypt and then the Ottoman Empire meant that they were hostile to the presence of the Portuguese in the region.

After the Sultanate of Adal invaded the Ethiopian Empire with Ottoman support, Portugal intervened on behalf of Emperor Gelawdewos against Adal.

== Early engagements ==
=== Mogadishu incident, 1498 ===
Upon sailing past Mogadishu on his way back to Portugal from India, Vasco da Gama engaged the ships anchored in its harbour, damaging a few.

=== Battle of Barawa, 1507 ===
At the request of the king of Malindi, who was an ally of the Portuguese, Tristão da Cunha and Afonso de Albuquerque attacked the rival city of Barawa in 1505, with a force of 1500 men and 16 ships. Barawa had 4000 warriors and its authorities were offered the chance to submit peacefully, but they refused. It was therefore assaulted and sacked, being rebuilt at a later date.

=== Zeila incident, 1513 ===
Shortly before the 1513 siege of Aden, the Portuguese governor of India Afonso de Albuquerque detached a two ship squadron to scout Zeila and to set fire to all the ships they could find. Its captains Rui Galvão and João Gomes landed on the city and tried to talk with the locals, but soon after they became involved in scuffles with mounted horsemen and others on foot. Realizing the inhabitants had no desire to engage in talks with the Portuguese, Galvão and Gomes continued with the plan and burnt all the twenty large ships in the harbour.

=== Battle of Zeila, 1517 ===
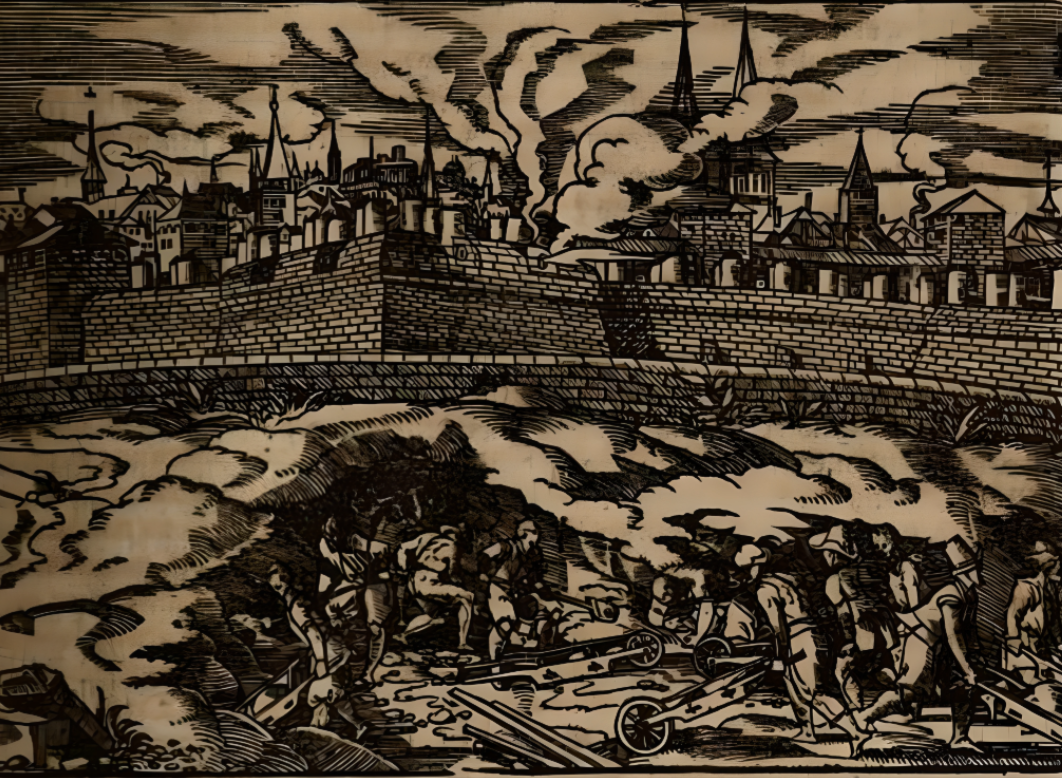
16th century engraving depicting the Battle of Zeila in 1517.

After the Portuguese governor of India Lopo Soares de Albergaria had conducted a campaign to the Red Sea in 1517, he razed the city of Zeila, whose garrison was away at the time and whose commander had recently been killed in combat while on campaign elsewhere, in Ethiopia.

=== Berbera raid, 1528 ===
In 1528, the Portuguese directed a naval attack against Berbera. The inhabitants were however alert and upon receiving news of the presence of a Portuguese fleet in the region, evacuated the city with all its belongings. The city was then razed by the Portuguese.

=== Battle of Massawa, 1541 ===
In 1541, troops of the Adal Sultanate attacked and killed all but two of a party of 100 Portuguese commanded by António Correia, who had mutinied and gone ashore at Massawa.

=== Battle of Benadir, 1542 ===
After the Portuguese conducted a large-scale naval expedition to Suez in 1541, the Ottoman Empire dedicated greater resources into protecting the Red Sea from Portuguese intrusion. To such effect, about 25 galleys were armed and stationed at Aden.

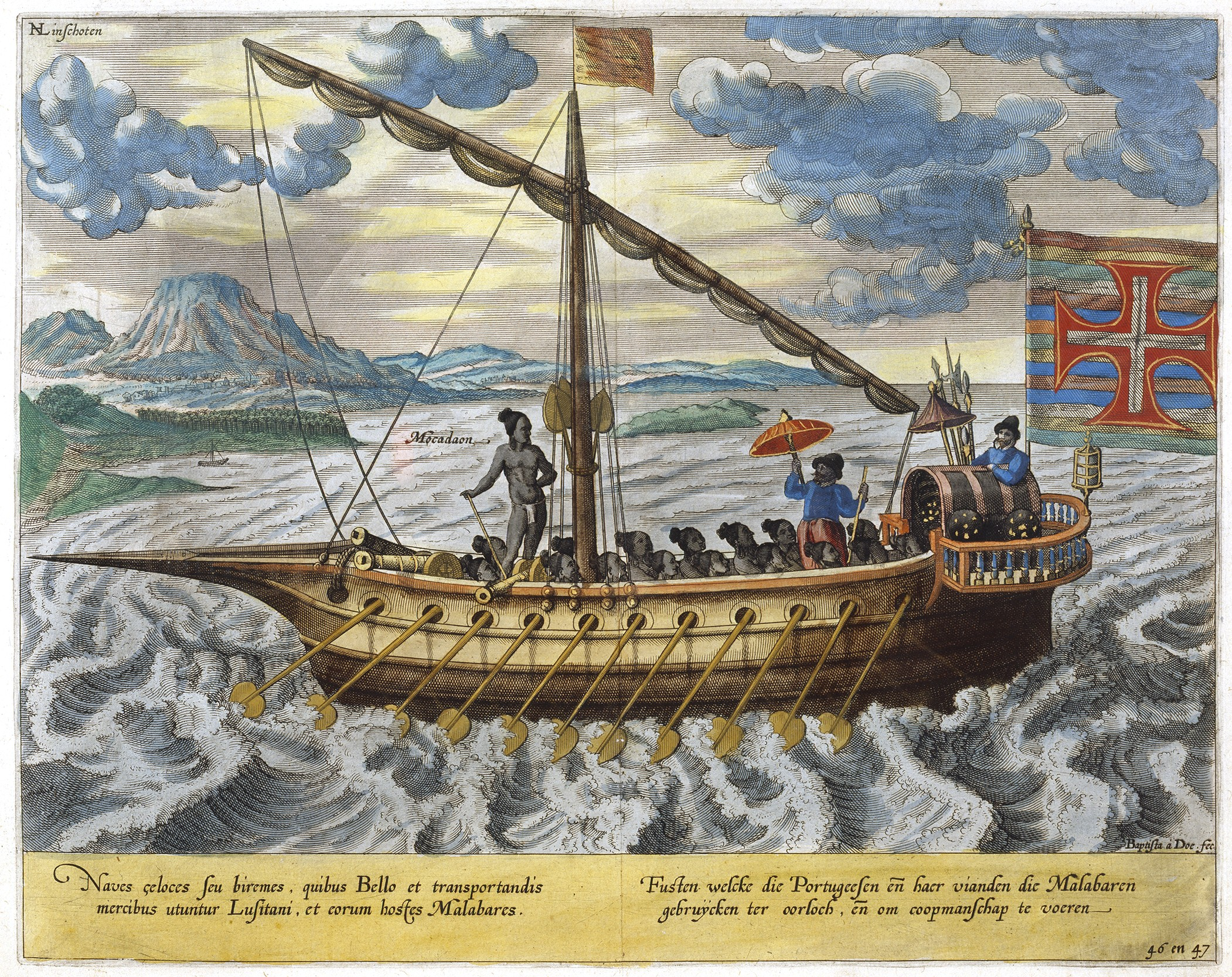
Portuguese oarship.

Having received reports from allied Swahili city-states that the hostile city of Mogadishu had appealed for Ottoman military support in preparation for a revolt against Portugal, the Portuguese captain of fort São Caetano at Sofala João de Sepúlveda departed with 100 soldiers, six oarships and a contingent of allied warriors and ships from Malindi, and upon arriving at Mogadishu "destroyed the city and did them great damage and injury". Barawa was also sacked in retaliation for its inhabitants having delivered a few Portuguese prisoners to the Turks. After signing new peace treaties with the rulers of both cities, Sepúlveda returned to Malindi.

== Ethiopian–Adal War ==
=== Battle of Jarte 1542 ===
The Ethiopian Empire had appealed for Portuguese military aid against the invading Adal Sultanate, and the Portuguese governor of India Dom Estevão da Gama dispatched his brother Cristóvão da Gama at the head of an expeditionary corps of 400 soldiers to the aid of Emperor Gelawdewos.

16th century Portuguese naval and war banner, featuring the Cross of the Order of Christ.

The Adal general Ahmad ibn Ibrahim al-Ghazi confronted Gama and the Portuguese at the Battle of Jarte, when he attempted to assault a Portuguese fortified camp. The Portuguese however, seized the initiative and marched out to attack the Adalites vigorously, routed their Turkish mercenaries and wounded Ahmad ibn Ibrahim al-Ghazi himself, causing the Adalite army to flee. The Portuguese suffered 11 dead and 50 wounded, against over 370 of the enemy.

=== Battle of Bacente, February 1542 ===
After invading part of Ethiopia, the Sultanate of Adal had occupied the Ethiopian mountain-top fortress of Bacente or Amba Senayt. It was garrisoned with 1500 archers and buckler-men. In February 1542, the Portuguese under Cristóvão da Gama stormed the fortress, suffering 8 dead in the process, but capturing the place, while the entire Adalite garrison was slaughtered by the Portuguese or the native Ethiopians. The expeditionary force spent the rest of February there, recovering from the battle.

=== Battle of the Hill of the Jews 1542 ===
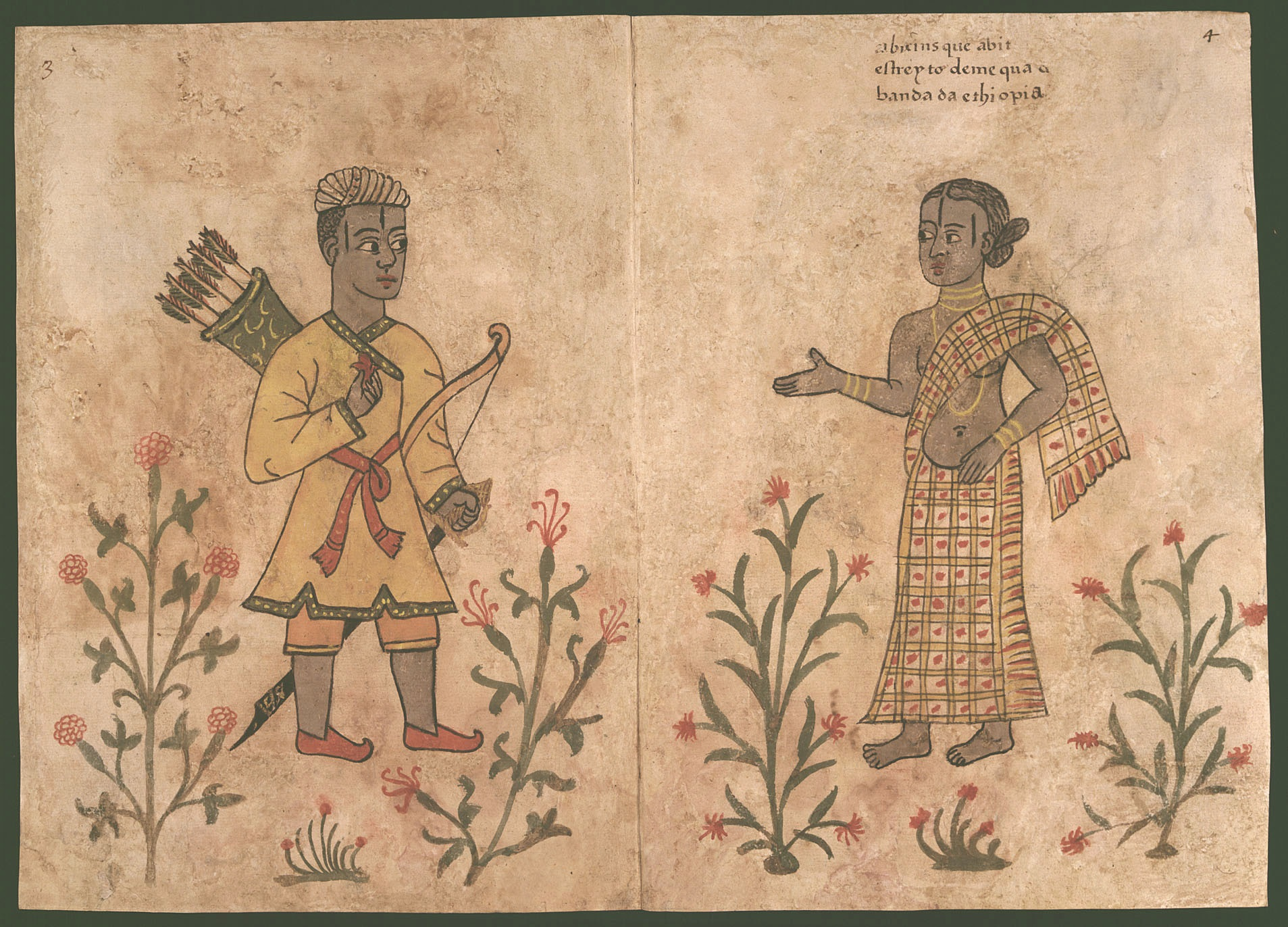
Ethiopians, depicted in the Códice Casanatense.

At the Battle of the Hill of the Jews, a Portuguese detachment personally commanded by Dom Cristóvão da Gama captured a hill controlled by an Adalite contingent of warriors, where valuable horses grazed. Dom Cristóvão then left a number of men behind to secure the animals and returned to camp, before fighting in the Battle of Wofla.

=== Battle of Wofla, August 1542 ===
Following their defeat at Jarte, imam requested aid from the governor of Ottoman Yemen, who provided him with a retinue of Turkish, Arab, and Albanian troops that would assist him in the Battle of Wofla.

In August 28, 1542 a large Adal army, which included a contingent of 2000 Arabian arquebusiers and 900 Turkish arquebusiers attacked the Portuguese at Wofla, successfully forcing them to flee their fortified camp erected upon a hill, killing 200. Dom Cristóvão was captured that night along with 14 comrades by followers of Imam Ahmad, who later personally executed him.

=== Battle of Wayna Daga, 1543 ===
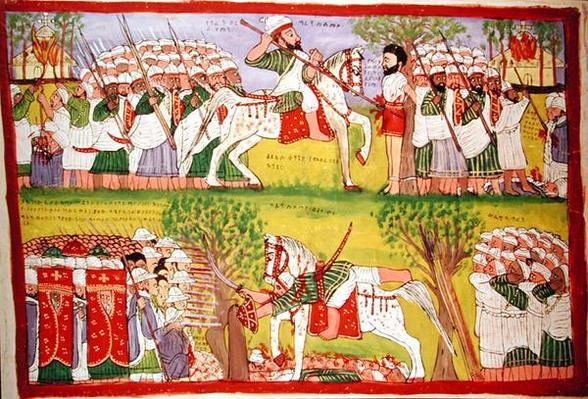
19th century folk painting of the Battle of Wayna Daga.

The Portuguese survivors of the Battle of Wofla managed to evade capture and then link up with the army of Emperor Gelawdewos, and requested that they avenge the death of Dom Cristóvão. The Portuguese would accept no other commander in replacement of Dom Cristóvão other than the Emperor himself. Large number of warriors flocked to the banner of the Emperor, and they marched out against Imam Ahmad, who had pitched camp near Lake Tana. On 13 February 1543, they defeated in Wogera an Adal detachment led by the Imam's lieutenant Sayid Mehmed, who was killed in the action. Prisonores then revealed the location of al-Ghazis camp.

At the Battle of Wayna Daga in 21 February 1543, the Ethiopians engaged the Adalites with the Portuguese in the vanguard. The Portuguese charged the Muslim army, followed by the Ethiopians. The Imam, seeing his men lose ground, moved up to encourage them, but upon approaching the Portuguese he was fatally shot. Tradition states that Imam Ahmad was shot in the chest by a Portuguese musketeer named João de Castilho, who had charged alone into the Muslim lines and died. The wounded Imam was then beheaded by an Ethiopian cavalry commander, Azmach Calite.

Soon after this, some of the Muslims attempted to flee, while others tried to stop them, resulting in their hindrance of one another. Witnessing their disorder and confusion, the Portuguese attacked, killing many. Simultaneously, the army of Gelawdewos attacked the Muslim rear, leading to a devastating rout, the fleeing Muslims pursued by the Ethiopians and Portuguese who cut them down as they ran back to their camp. The Portuguese suffered 4 dead in this battle, while reportedly half of the Muslim army either surrendered or was killed.

== Later conflicts ==
=== Berbera raid, 1550 ===
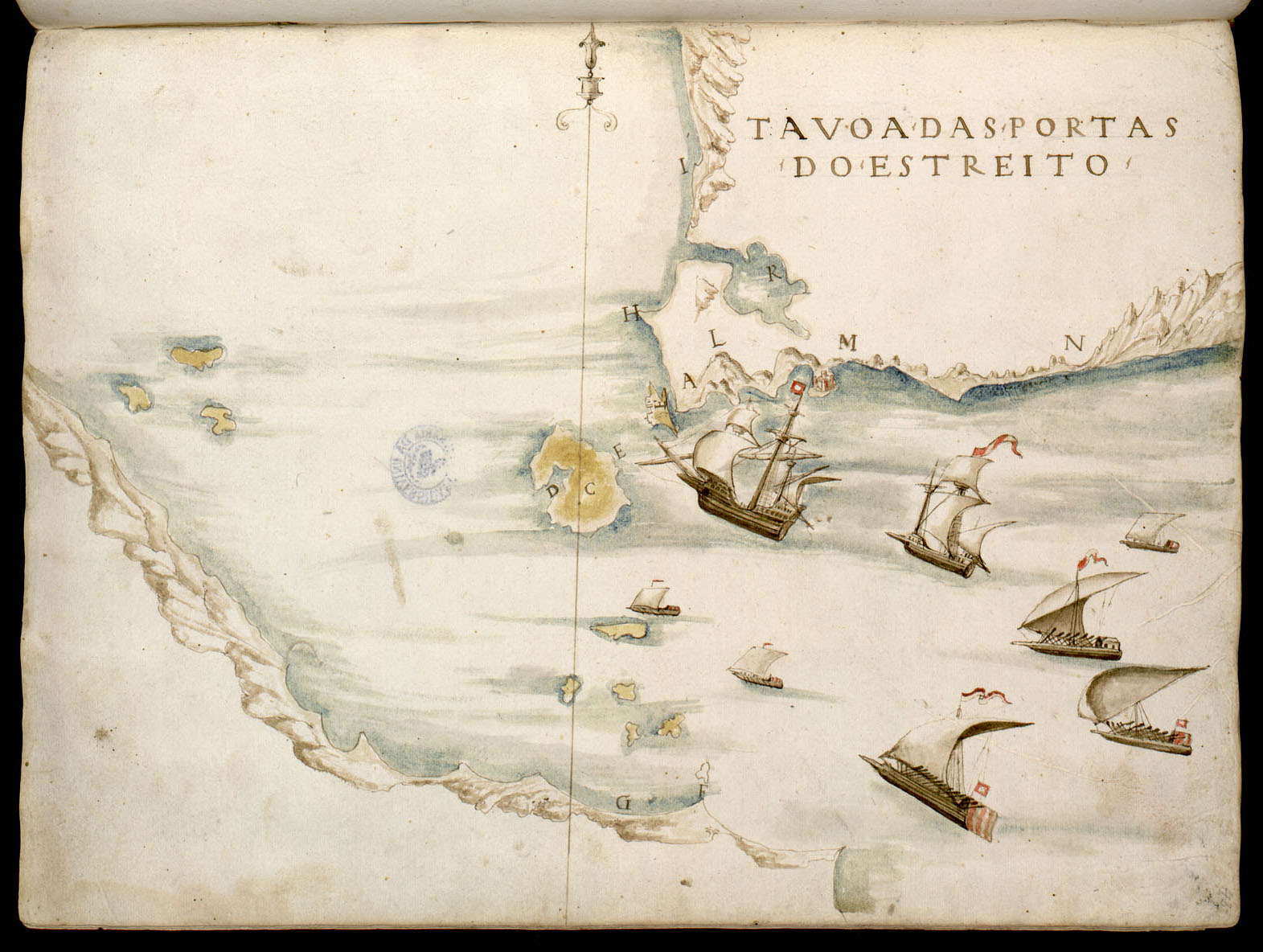
1542 Portuguese sketch of the Gates of the Red Sea, by João de Castro.

In February 1550, the Portuguese governor of India Jorge Cabral dispatched Gonçalo Vaz de Távora to the Red Sea with four oarships to gather information regarding the Ottomans and the Portuguese in Ethiopia. Távora reached Massawa and on his way back attacked Berbera, whose inhabitants hurriedly evacuated the city as soon as they sighted the Portuguese ships. The houses were then sacked and torched.

Through a number of prisoners captured at Berbera the Portuguese learnt that the Ottomans were preparing a campaign, but the objective of which was unknown. A number of tradeships were then captured along the coast. Távora reached Goa on May 17, 1550.

=== 1586-1589 Revolt in Southeast Africa ===
In 1586, the Turkish privateer Mir Ali Beg sailed to Southern East Africa and convinced the cities on the swahili coast to declare their allegiance to the Ottoman Empire and revolt against Portuguese suzerainty in region. Mogadishu and Barawa joined the Southern East African revolt and supplied Mir Ali Beg with men and ships. He later erected a stronghold in Mombasa and extracted tribute from the cities but two punitive Portuguese campaigns dispatched from Goa in 1587 and 1589 however reestablished Portuguese authority along the Southern east African coast for decades to come.

== Aftermath ==
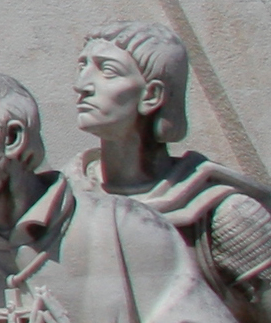
Effigy of Dom Cristóvão da Gama at the Monument to the Discovery Age in Lisbon.

The Omani Yarubids challenged Portuguese supremacy in the east African coast in the 17th century and after decades of conflict in 1698 captured the Portuguese Fort Jesus at Mombasa, marking the end of political and commercial Portuguese influence north of this city.

In recent times, the Portuguese navy has resumed operations in the Horn area, against unofficial groups of Somali pirates as part of NATOs Operation Allied Protector, Operation Ocean Shield and the European Unions Operation Atalanta.

== See also ==
- Mamluk-Portuguese conflicts
- Ottoman–Portuguese conflicts (1538–1560)
- Portuguese Mozambique
- Military history of Portugal
