= Battle of Suakin (1541) =

Portuguese defeat of Ottomans in Sudan

- Part of Ottoman–Portuguese conflicts (1538–1559)
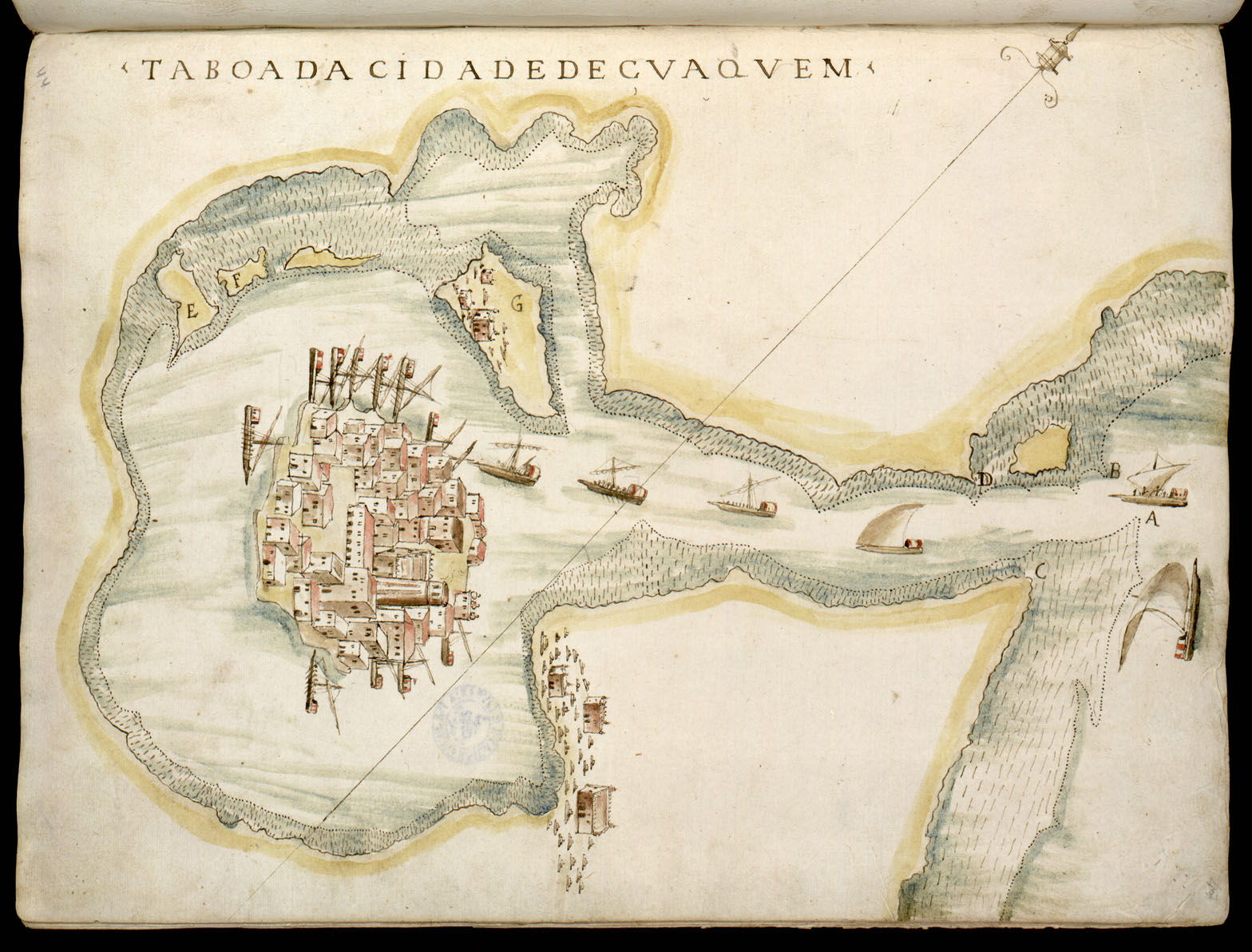
- Suakin and the Portuguese fleet in 1540, depiction by Dom João de Castro
Date	1541
Location	Suakin, west coast of the Red Sea Sudan
Result	Portuguese victory

Belligerents
Portugal	Ottoman Empire

Commanders and leaders
Dom Estevão da Gama; Dom Cristóvão da Gama	Unknown

Strength
1,000 soldiers	Unknown

The Battle of Suakin of 1541 was an armed encounter that took place in 1541 in the city of Suakin (Suaquém in Portuguese), held by the Ottoman Empire, and which was attacked, sacked and razed by Portuguese forces under the command of the Portuguese governor of India, Dom Estêvão da Gama.

== Background ==
Suakin was one of, if not the most, prosperous cities on the west coast of the Red Sea. It had fallen under Ottoman rule after they had conquered the Mamluk Sultanate of Egypt in 1517.

Two years after the Ottomans had attacked the Portuguese fortress of Diu in Gujarat, India, the Portuguese Governor of India, Dom Estevão da Gama considered the moment ripe for a retaliatory campaign against the Ottomans in the Red Sea. To this effect, he set sail from Goa in January 1541 ahead of a fleet of 80 ships and 2,000 soldiers.

== Battle ==
On their way to Suez, the Portuguese anchored at Massawa, and from there Dom Estevão ordered his brother Dom Cristóvão to proceed with a small forward flotilla to blockade the island of Suakin, on which its city stood, until he could arrive with reinforcements.

Made aware of the Portuguese approach by scouts, the ruler of Suakin withdrew to the mainland with his treasure and Turkish guard, and had established a camp one league (6 km) away from the coast by the time Dom Cristóvão had arrived. Dom Estevão arrived on February 22 with a larger naval force, and initiated talks, seeking to obtain pilots that would guide him to Suez where he planned to extract a ransom in exchange for not sacking the city.

After several days of stalled negotiations, on March 8 Dom Estevão landed 1,000 men on the mainland before the sun had risen, determined to attack the camp. The Portuguese were divided in two squadrons of 500 men each, one commanded by the governor personally, flying a banner bearing the Cross of Christ, and another by his brother Dom Cristóvão, who would proceed in the vanguard.

The Portuguese reached the camp before daybreak and managed to catch its occupants by surprise, breach into its perimeter and cause havoc in their attack, killing many and causing the rest to flee. The camp was plundered and anything that could not be carried back to the fleet was set on fire.

The following day, Dom Cristóvão sacked Suakin ahead of the entirety of the Portuguese forces, who afterwards razed the city, the soldiers tearing down the buildings. Rich spoils were recovered, including food supplies, valuable merchandise as well as hostages that were returned later in exchange for ransom. The Portuguese left Suakin on 9th or 10 March 1541.

== See also ==
- Battle of Suez (1541)
