= Battle of Massawa (1541) =

Battle during the Ethiopian-Adal War

- Part of the Ethiopian–Adal War
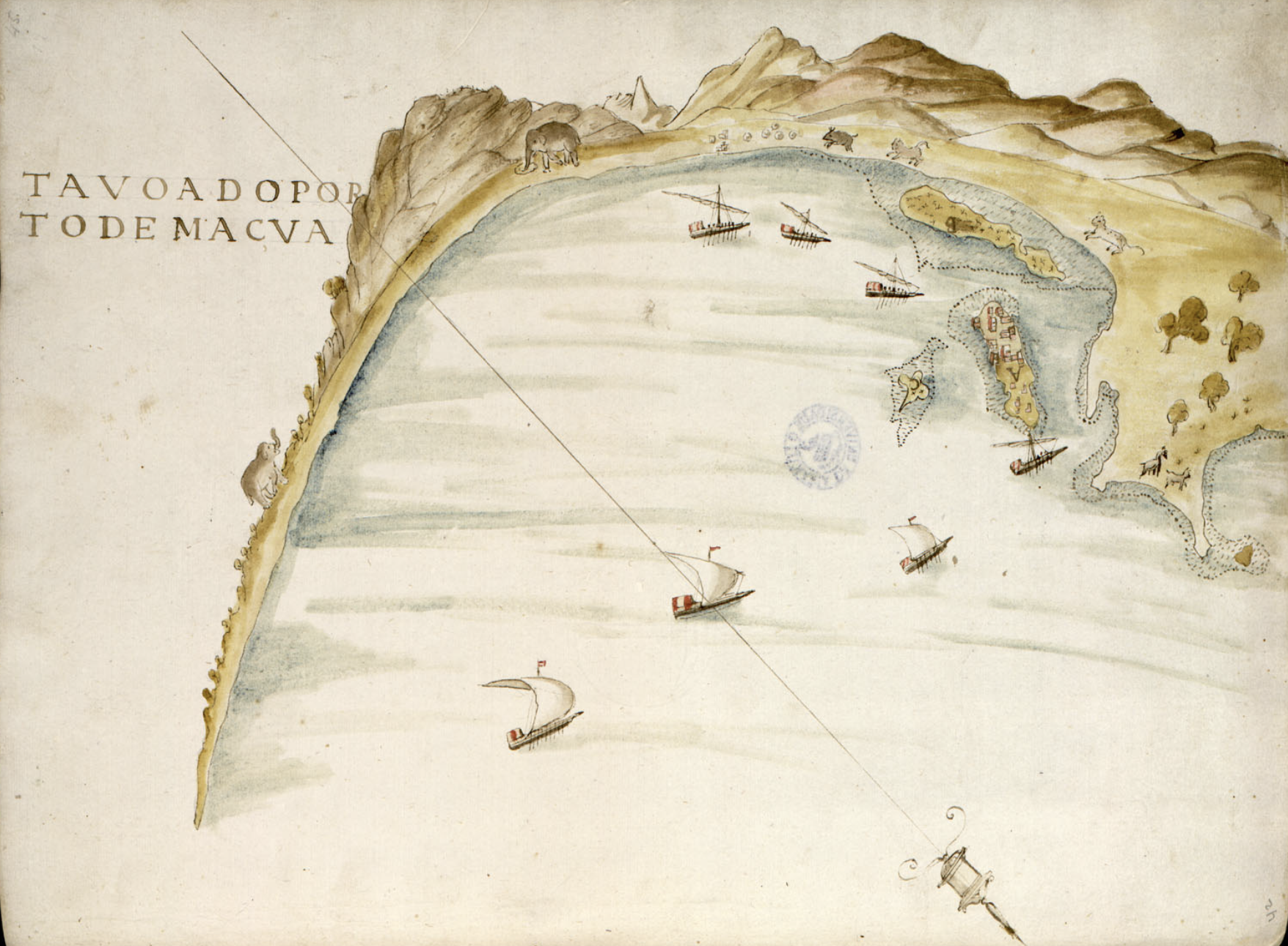
- Drawing of Massawa by D. João Castro c. 1541
Date	April 1541
Location	Massawa, Adal Sultanate (now Eritrea)
Result	Adalite victory

Belligerents
Portuguese Empire	Adal Sultanate

Commanders and leaders
Antonio Correa †	Ahmed ibn Ibrahim

Strength
100 men	Unknown

Casualties and losses
All but 2 killed	Unknown

The Battle of Massawa was an armed encounter between the Portuguese Empire and the Adal Sultanate near Massawa in April 1541. The Adalites ambushed and destroyed the Portuguese force with only two survivors returning to their ships.

== Background ==
By the end of March, the Portuguese fleet set sail for the Battle of Suez, though some vessels remained stationed at Massawa, where they spent over a month. The port’s extreme climate and near-total lack of provisions took a severe toll on the Portuguese forces left behind, and the prospect of starving to death drove more than a hundred of them to mutiny. They threatened to kill their commanding officer, Manuel da Gama, when he attempted to resist them. Furthermore, João Bermudez, the physician of Rodrigo da Lima’s embassy and a key proponent of the military campaign against the Adal Sultanate, persuaded these mutineers that his highland patriarchate was a paradise and that there was a Christian cause worth fighting for. His propaganda was lavish with promises on the Emperor's behalf, where he made constant endowments on paper. He was anticipating with appearing before Dawit II backed by a strong contingent, but he overreached himself at last. His glowing tales made men’s mouths water and they could not wait. One by one they slipped ashore and disappeared, the watchmen sounded the alarm and Manuel da Gama ordered them to be fired upon but the gunners' sympathies were on the side of the deserters, and with good will, all missed the mark. They were led by Fidalgo Antonio Correa and headed towards the shore to reach the Emperor's camp in the interior. Hearing of the Portuguese contingent of 100 men arriving to assist the Abyssinians, Imam Ahmad ibn Ibrahim sent an expedition to counter them.

== Battle ==
The Portuguese landed safely on the beach and organised into a little band. They played music with their fifes and drums to enliven the way, and a pennon to carry before them. They found a guide who was willing to take them through the desolate hinterland. All night, they followed their guide across scorching, rugged mountains where the lingering heat felt like the sun still shone. Scrambling over blistering stones and breathing the desert’s fiery air, they were tormented by a thirst they had carelessly overlooked. While they had drums, trumpets, and guns, they had brought no water, and none was to be found in the barren wilderness. As their desperation grew, they begged the guide to lead them to water, knowing they couldn’t survive without it. The guide, feigning goodwill, led them into valleys, promising water ahead. Exhausted but hopeful, they pressed on, only to walk into an ambush at dawn. Realising the guide’s betrayal, they killed him and fought fiercely against the Moors, who attacked with arrows and slings. Despite the chaos, their guns inflicted heavy damage, keeping the enemy at bay. The Muslim forces comprised soldiers from Sharif Nur, the appointed Muslim Bahr Negash, troops of Imam Ahmad, and Turkish mercenaries. Antonio Correa was the first man to be killed, but another captain was appointed hastily, and the battle continued.

The Moors later developed a strategy where they suddenly cried out that the fighting should end and that it had started only by mistake. They all claimed to be Christians and loyal vassals of Prester John. They asserted they assumed the Portuguese were robbers at first sight which ignited the attack. Given the daylight had revealed their true identity, peace was the initiative. Hostilities ceased immediately, yet some Portuguese remained wary, believing it more prudent to continue fighting. However, the majority, driven mad by thirst, could focus on nothing but their desperate need for water. The scorching sun blazed down on the barren wasteland, and without a guide, they had no hope of finding water on their own. Killing their captors would mean losing their only chance of survival. The makeshift captain, overcome by the agony of thirst, realised he could endure no more. He was feeble and persuaded by this frailty, the captain convinced his comrades to seek peace. In response, the Moors warmly embraced the Portuguese as though they were long-lost brothers. When asked if they could provide water, the Moslems kindly assured them it would be arranged immediately. Trusting their captors, the Portuguese followed them unknowingly to the King of Zeila’s tent. Inside the tent, imam was sitting with his hands devoutly clasped about a string of beads to which was hung a little wooden cross. Reverently he handed this chaplet to the Portuguese captain. “I say my prayers with these,” Ahmad explained. The Portuguese were interested to inquire the sincerity of his devotions. They asked their pious host if they could have water, the Imam ordered gourds full of water to be brought. The sight was too much for parched and weary men. Oblivious of their surroundings, they cast their weapons to the ground and drank. They drank and drank and drank, and then loosened their belts to drink still more. The Moors, meanwhile, laughing and chatting pleasantly, picked up the muskets, swords, and lances and examined them. It all was done in such an innocent and casual manner.

The Moors, having seized the majority of the weapons, turned them against the Portuguese, inflicting numerous casualties. "Surrender," commanded the Imam, "and your lives will be spared." With most of them disarmed, surrender seemed the only option. Yet, fourteen brave souls refused. "Fools!" they cried to their comrades. "Why yield to traitors? Die with honour, for they will show you no mercy!" With those final words, they clutched their remaining weapons, stood their ground, and fought to the death. Within minutes, all was over. But among them, one man, though gravely wounded, had the presence of mind to collapse and feign death, face down in his own blood. With unyielding self-control, he remained motionless throughout the day, silently bearing witness to his fallen companions' fate. The Moors bound the surrendered prisoners hand and foot, stripped them of their clothing, and confined them in a cattle pen. As evening approached, the Moors assembled outside on horseback, their lances glinting in the fading light. At their command, the pen was unlatched, and one captive was released, forced to step forward where the Imam and his captains waited on horseback. Naked and defenceless, the unfortunate prisoner was met with the Imam's spear, the first wound delivered by his hand. One by one, the others followed suit, each taking their turn in tormenting the victim until he collapsed lifeless. Then, another captive was summoned, and the cruel ritual was repeated, victim after victim, until none remained. When the sun had cooled and silence fell over the slaughter, the Moors gathered their belongings and departed, leaving behind only the lifeless bodies that covered the ground.
