= Lake Ashenge =

Lake in Tigray Region, Ethiopia

Lake Hashenge
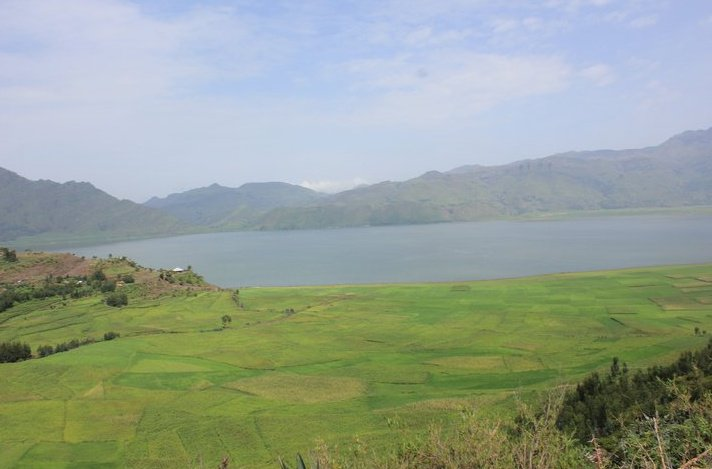

- Location within Ethiopia
- Coordinates: 12°34′50″N 39°30′00″E
- Primary outflows: none
- Basin countries: Ethiopia
- Max. length: 5 km (3.1 mi)
- Max. width: 4 km (2.5 mi)
- Surface area: 20 km^{2} (7.7 sq mi)
- Surface elevation: 2,409 m (7,904 ft)

Lake Hashenge (also ጻዕዳ ባሕሪ Lake Hashange, Lake Hashengi) is a lake in the southern Tigray Region of Ethiopia. Located in the Ethiopian Highlands at an elevation of 2409 meters, it has no outlet. According to the Statistical Abstract of Ethiopia for 1967/68, Lake Hashenge is five kilometers long and four wide, with a surface area of 20 square kilometers.

The British explorer Henry Salt, who notes that the Tigrinya name of the lake is Tsada Bahri ("White Sea") from the number of birds which cover its surface, records a local tradition that a large city once stood on the site of Hashenge, but "it was destroyed, in his displeasure, by the immediate hand of God." The legend is vivid up to today.

On shores of the lake is Mifsas Bahri an important archaeological site of late Axumite remains.

== History ==
On August 29, 1542, Ahmad ibn Ibrahim al-Ghazi, the leader of the Adal Sultanate, advanced upon the Portuguese stockade near Ofla on the southern side of Ashenge, where he fought the Battle of Wofla and prevailed, afterwards capturing and killing the leader Cristóvão da Gama.

Another notable battle that took place on the shores of this lake was the Battle of Lake Ashenge on 9 October 1909, when Dejazmach Abate Bwalu defeated the rebel forces of Dejazmach Abraha Araya.

On 3 April 1936, thousands of soldiers of the Ethiopian Empire were killed with poison gas all around Lake Ashenge. The soldiers were withdrawing from the Battle of Maychew during the Second Italo-Abyssinian War. As they withdrew, the Italians sprayed and bombed the area around the lake with mustard gas to deadly effect. On 4 April, Emperor Haile Selassie I looked with despair upon the horrific sight of the dead bodies of his army ringing the poisoned lake.

== Natural history ==
Freshwater snail Ancylus ashangiensis is only known from Lake Ashenge.

Lake Ashenge, a closed-basin lake near the northernmost penetration of summer monsoon rains, is well placed to provide a continental record of past changes in the strength of the African monsoon system. Diatom and oxygen isotope analyses of the lake sediments confirm that the overall trend of climate change during the past 17,000 years was driven by precessional forcing, punctuated by abrupt shifts that may be linked to changes in Atlantic surface temperatures.

== Sources ==
- Barker, A.J. (1971). Rape of Ethiopia, 1936. New York: Ballantine Books. p. 160 pages. ISBN 978-0-345-02462-6.
