= Monument of the Discoveries =

- Padrão dos Descobrimentos
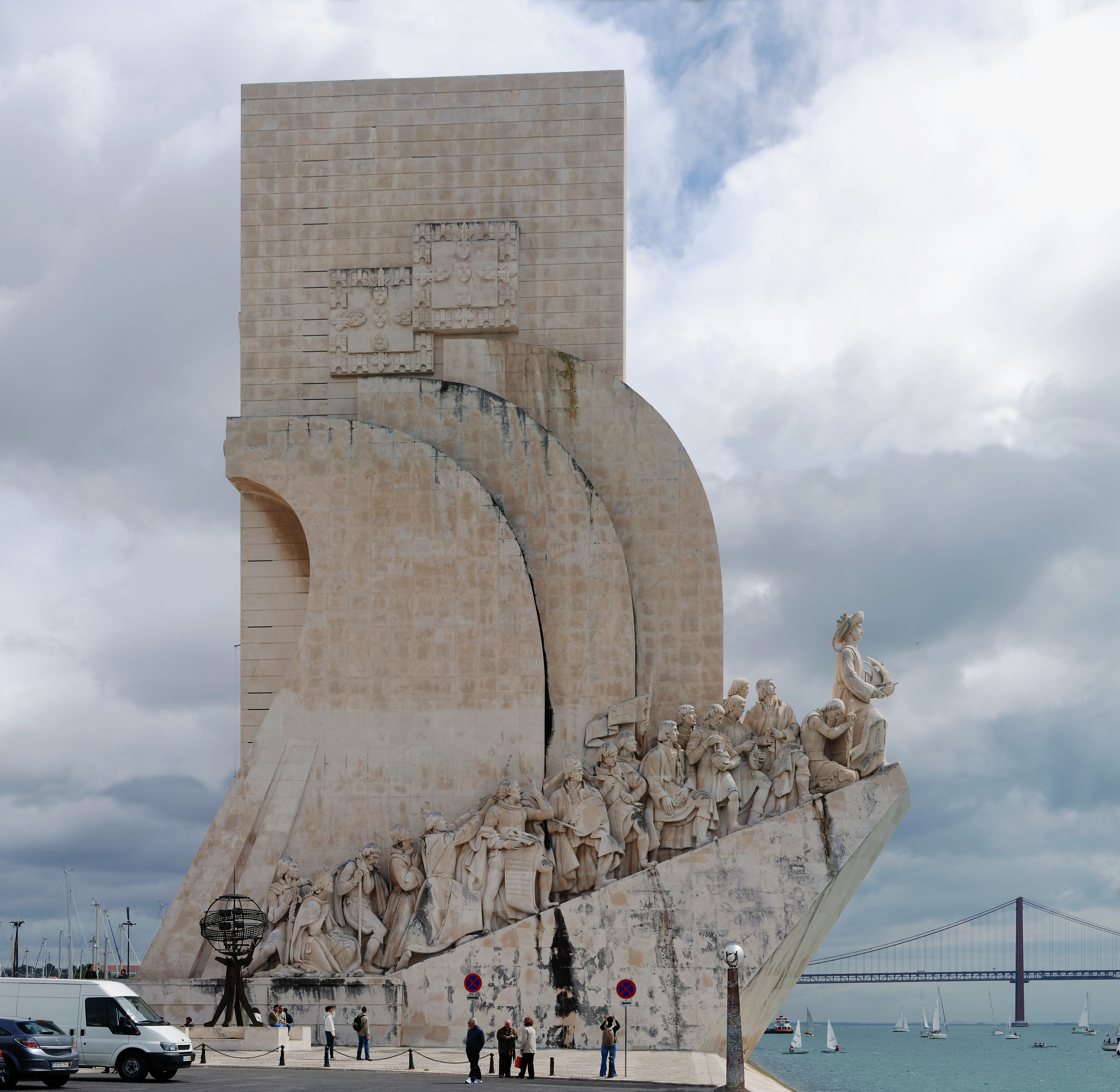
- The Padrão dos Descobrimentos on the edge of the Tejo River, as seen along its western profile

- Location within Lisbon

General information
- Type: Monument
- Architectural style: Modern classicism
- Location: Santa Maria de Belém, Lisbon, Portugal
- Coordinates: 38°41′36.98″N 9°12′20.59″W
- Opened: 3 February 1958; 68 years ago
- Owner: Portuguese Republic

Technical details
- Material: Steel

Design and construction
- Architect: Cottinelli Telmo

Website
- padraodosdescobrimentos.pt

The Monument of the Discoveries (Portuguese: Padrão dos Descobrimentos, Portuguese pronunciation: [pɐˈðɾɐ̃w duʒ ðɨʃkuβɾiˈmẽtuʃ]) is a monument on the northern bank of the Tejo River estuary, in the civil parish of Santa Maria de Belém, Lisbon. Located along the river where ships departed to explore and trade with India and the Orient, the monument celebrates the Portuguese Age of Discovery (or "Age of Exploration") during the 15th and 16th centuries.

== History ==
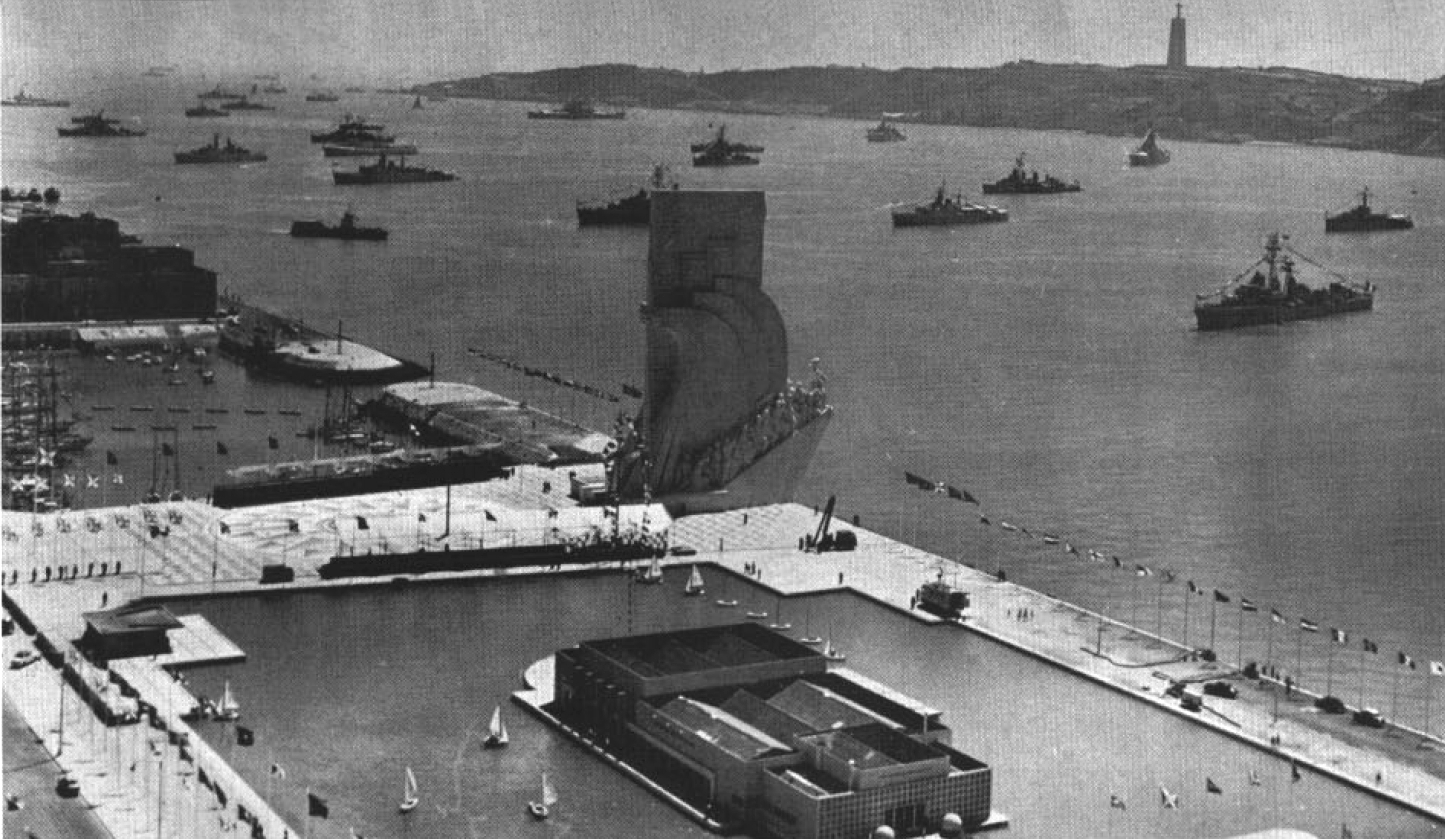
Inauguration in 1960 with 32 ships of 14 nations.

The monument was conceived in 1939 by Portuguese architect José Ângelo Cottinelli Telmo, and sculptor Leopoldo de Almeida, as a temporary beacon during the Portuguese World Exhibition opening in June 1940. The Monument to the Discoveries represented a romanticized idealization of the Portuguese exploration that was typical of the Estado Novo regime of António de Oliveira Salazar. It was originally constructed as a temporary construction, located in the Praça do Império as part of an urban renewal project favoured by minister Duarte Pacheco, but with the resistance of Cottinelli Telmo. Yet, by June 1943, the original structure was demolished after the exposition as there was no concrete formalization of the project.

On 3 February 1958, in decree No. 41-517, the government, through the Ministério de Obras Publicas (Ministry of Public Works), the Overseas Provinces and the Câmara Municipal of Lisbon, promoted the intent to construct a permanent Monument to the Discoveries. Between November 1958 and January 1960, the new monument was constructed in cement and rose-tinted stone (from Leiria), and the statues sculpted from limestone excavated from the region of Sintra. The new project was enlarged from the original 1940 model as part of the commemorations to celebrate the fifth centennial of the death of Infante Henry the Navigator.

Although the project was based on Cottinelli Telmo's plan, he was replaced after his death by António Pardal Monteiro (as primary architect), and stability studies were completed under the direction of engineers Edgar Cardoso, Ruy Correia and António Franco e Abreu. The interior plan was executed by António Pardal Monteiro, who also worked with Luís Cristino da Silva to plan the monumental square. The northern part of the property was completed by the firm Pardal Monteiro, while the southern area was completed by José Raimundo. The sculptures were modeled by Leopoldo de Almeida, with the assistance of sculptors Soares Branco and António Santos, using models by António Cândido and Carlos Escobar (under the direction of António Branco and Alfredo Henriques).

Inaugurated on 9 August 1960, it was one of several projects nationwide that were intended to mark the Comemorações Henriquinas (the celebrations marking the anniversary of the death of Henry the Navigator). Yet it was not completely finished until 10 October 1960, being transferred to the responsibility of the Administração Geral do Porto de Lisboa (General Administration of the Port of Lisbon). Although in 1962, an accord was signed with the Câmara Municipal of Lisbon to transfer its title, between 1960 and 1979 nothing was done with the monument. A document (Despacho No.57/P/79) published in the municipal journal (No. 13260, 5 November 1979) advanced the city's intention to produce a permanent exhibition, but it was only in 1985 that public works completed the cultural centre (Portuguese: Centro Cultural das Descobertas) which inaugurated public access to the top of the structure, in addition to creating spaces for an observation deck, auditorium and hall for exhibitions. In April 2003, the management of the Padrão dos Descobrimentos was placed in the custody of the public company Gestão de Equipamentos e Animação Cultural (EGEAC, E.E.M.).

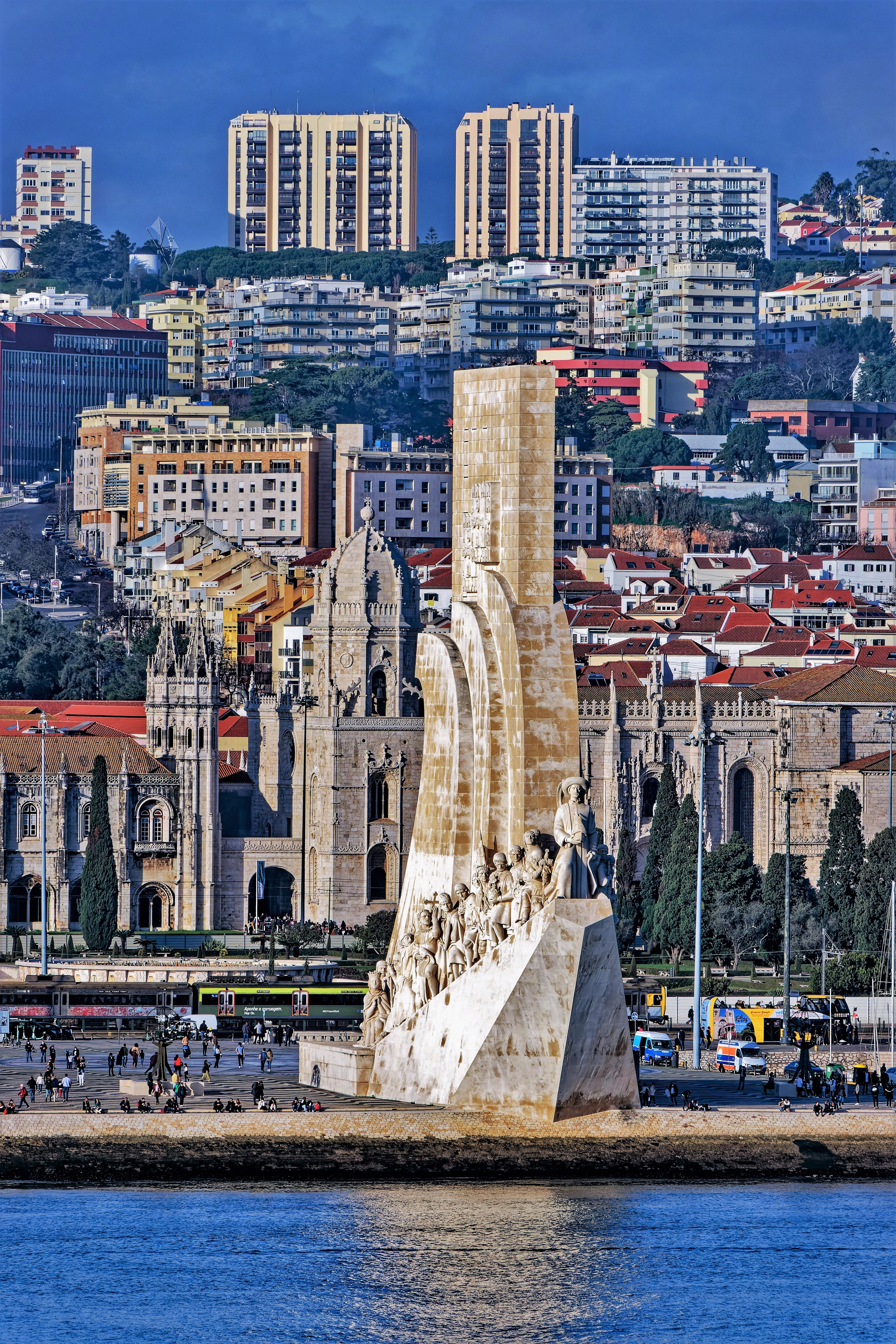
The Monument to the Discoveries seen from the Tagus.

== Architecture ==
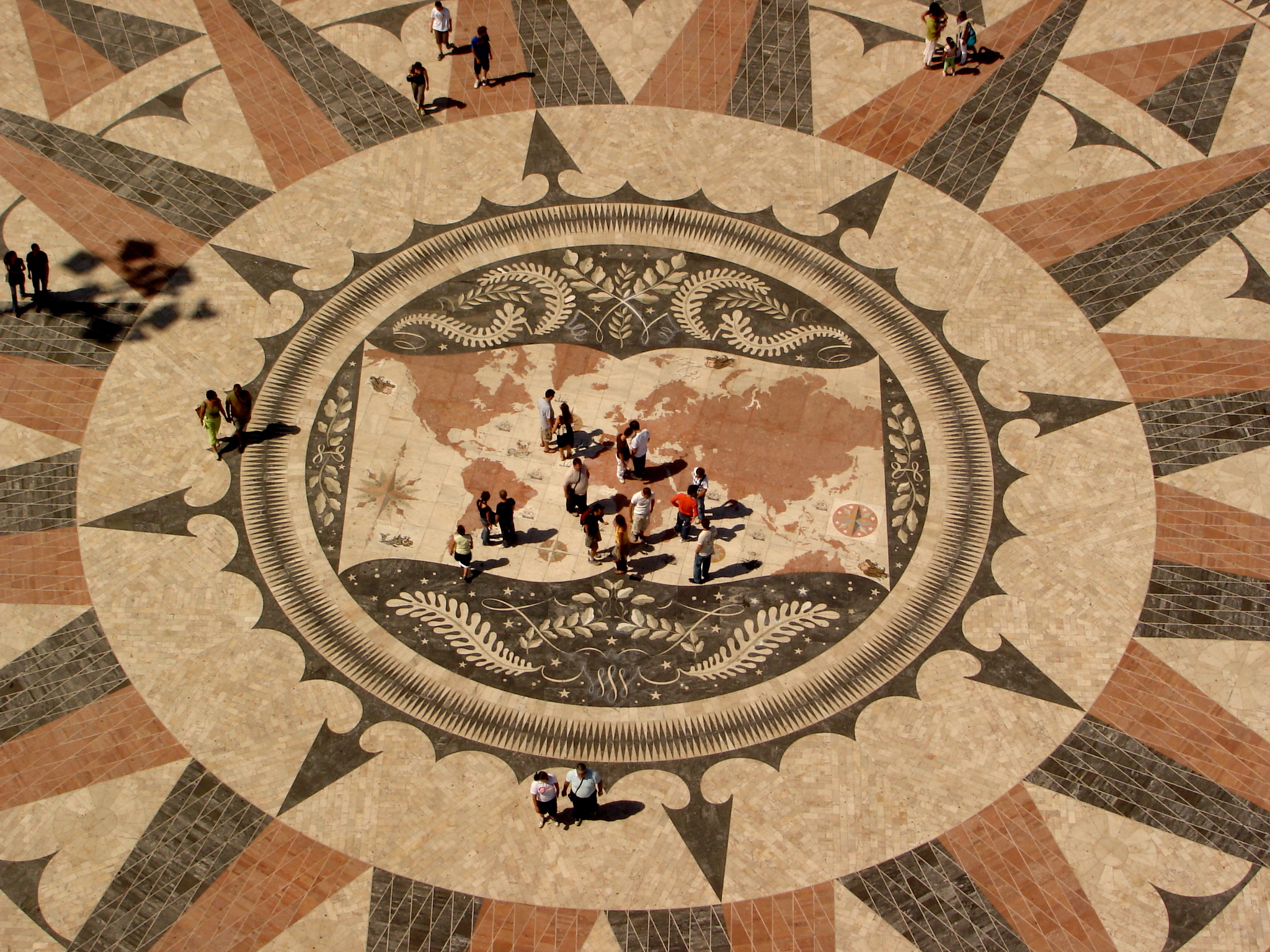
The compass rose and mappa mundi, a gift from the Union of South Africa created from beige, black and red limestone. Jerónimos Monastery is in the background.

The structure is located on the northern bank of the Tagus River, neighboring the Belém Marina, Algés and Dafundo Nautical Centre, and the Museum of Popular Art (Portuguese: Museu de Arte Popular), and demarcated by stone pedestals with armillary spheres. Opposite the large square, and across the Avenida da Índia-Avenida de Brasília motorway, is the Praça do Império (Empire Square) which fronts the Jerónimos Monastery, Belém Cultural Center and the green-spaces of the Jardim Vasco da Gama.

The original structure, which Telmo, Barros and Almeida created, was erected in steel and cement, while the 33 statues were produced in a composite of plaster and tow. Ostensibly a 56-metre-high (184 ft) slab standing vertically along the bank of the Tagus, the design takes the form of the prow of a caravel (ship used in the early Portuguese exploration). On either side of the slab are ramps that join at the river's edge, with the figure of Henry the Navigator on its edge. On either side of the Infante, along the ramp, are 16 figures (33 in total) representing figures from the Portuguese Age of Discovery. These great people of the era included monarchs, explorers, cartographers, artists, scientists and missionaries. Each idealized figure is designed to show movement towards the front (the unknown sea), projecting a direct or indirect synthesis of their participation in the events after Henry.

The South African government was responsible for gifting the construction of the square in front of the monument: the 50-metre-diameter (160 ft) Rosa-dos-Ventos (compass rose) was executed using different types of limestone, including lioz, a rare type of beige limestone found only around Lisbon, more specifically in Sintra. Designed by the architect Cristino da Silva, it includes a Mappa mundi that is 14 metres wide, showing the routes of Portuguese carracks and caravels during the Age of Discovery.

On the northern façade flanking the staircase are two inscriptions in metal: on the left, "AO INFANTE D. HENRIQVE E AOS PORTVGVESES QVE DESCOBRIRAM OS CAMINHOS DO MAR" (To Prince Lord Henry and the Portuguese that Discovered the Paths of the Sea) over a metal anchor; and, on the right, the words "NO V CENTENÁRIO DO INFANTE D. HENRIQVE 1460 – 1960" (On the Fifth centenary of Prince Lord Henry 1460–1960), over a crown of laurel. The double staircase ascends one level, before the entranceway to the monument, allowing a perspective on the square and the lateral figures.

The interior consists of three areas: the auditorium with space for 101 people, a stage of 18 square metres (190 sq ft), with film projection booth; a secondary level with two halls for exhibitions; and the last level with four rooms. Normally, the auditorium hosts a multimedia exhibition on the history of Lisbon, while the other rooms are used for exhibitions. The top of the monument (reached via a lift or 267 stairs) offers views of the Tagus river, the Belém neighbourhood and its many attractions, including the Belém Tower and the Jerónimos Monastery, which date from the Age of Discovery.

=== Statues ===
In addition to the main statue of Henry the Navigator, holding a model of a carrack, on either side of the ramps of the monument are a total of 33 figures from the history of the Discoveries, specifically (from left to right):

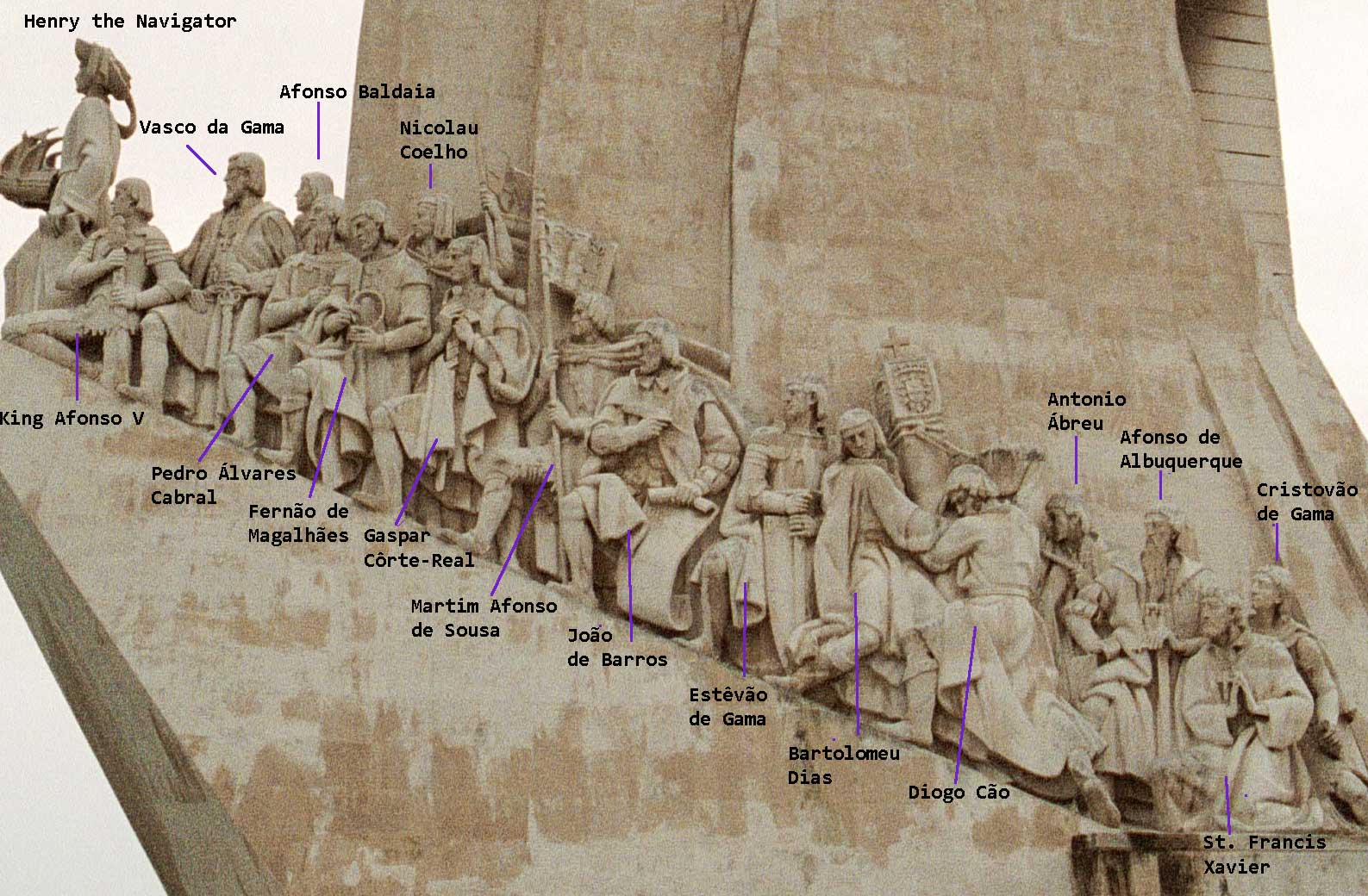
Eastern profile (figures labeled)

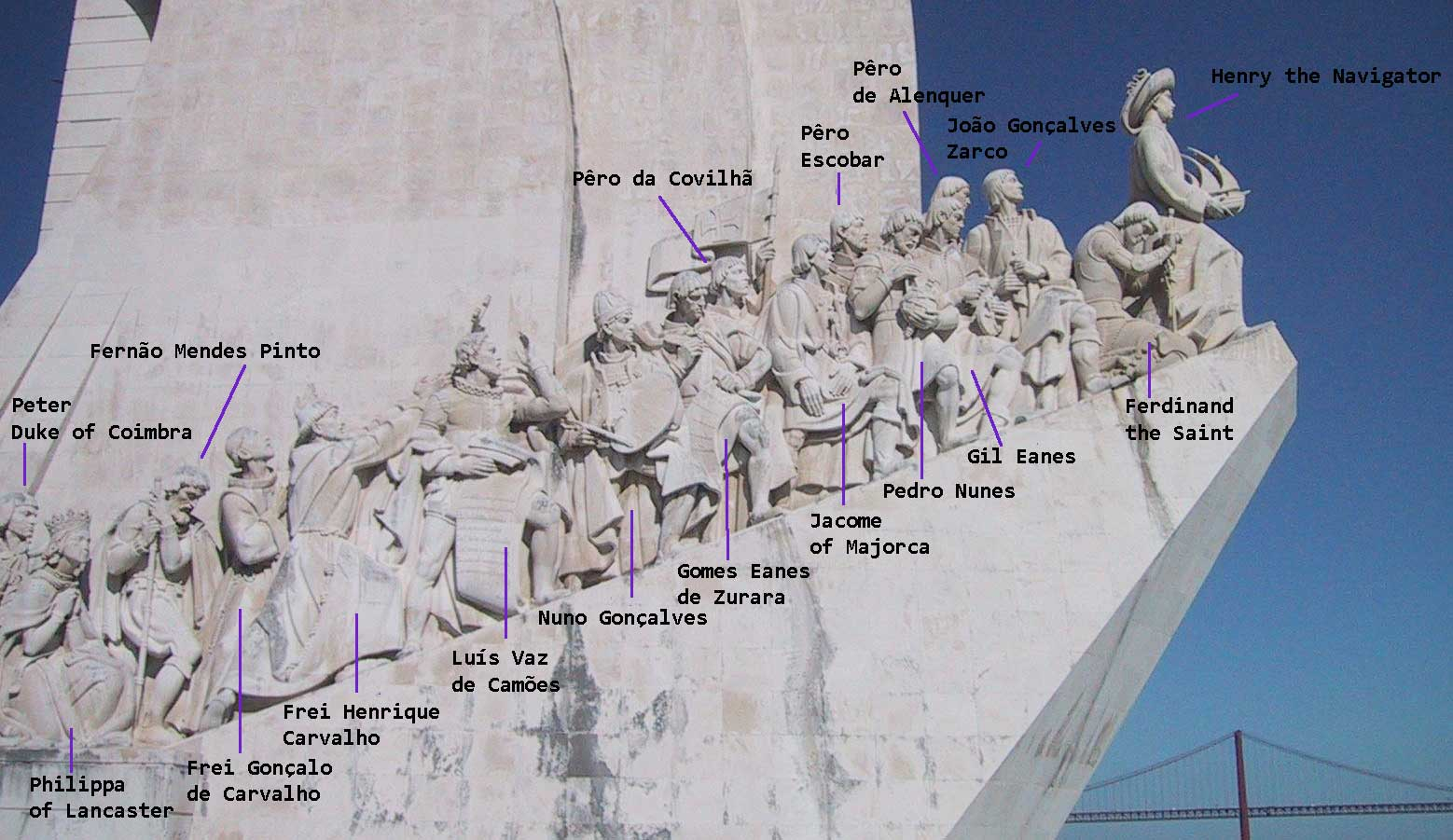
Western profile (figures labeled)

Eastern profile

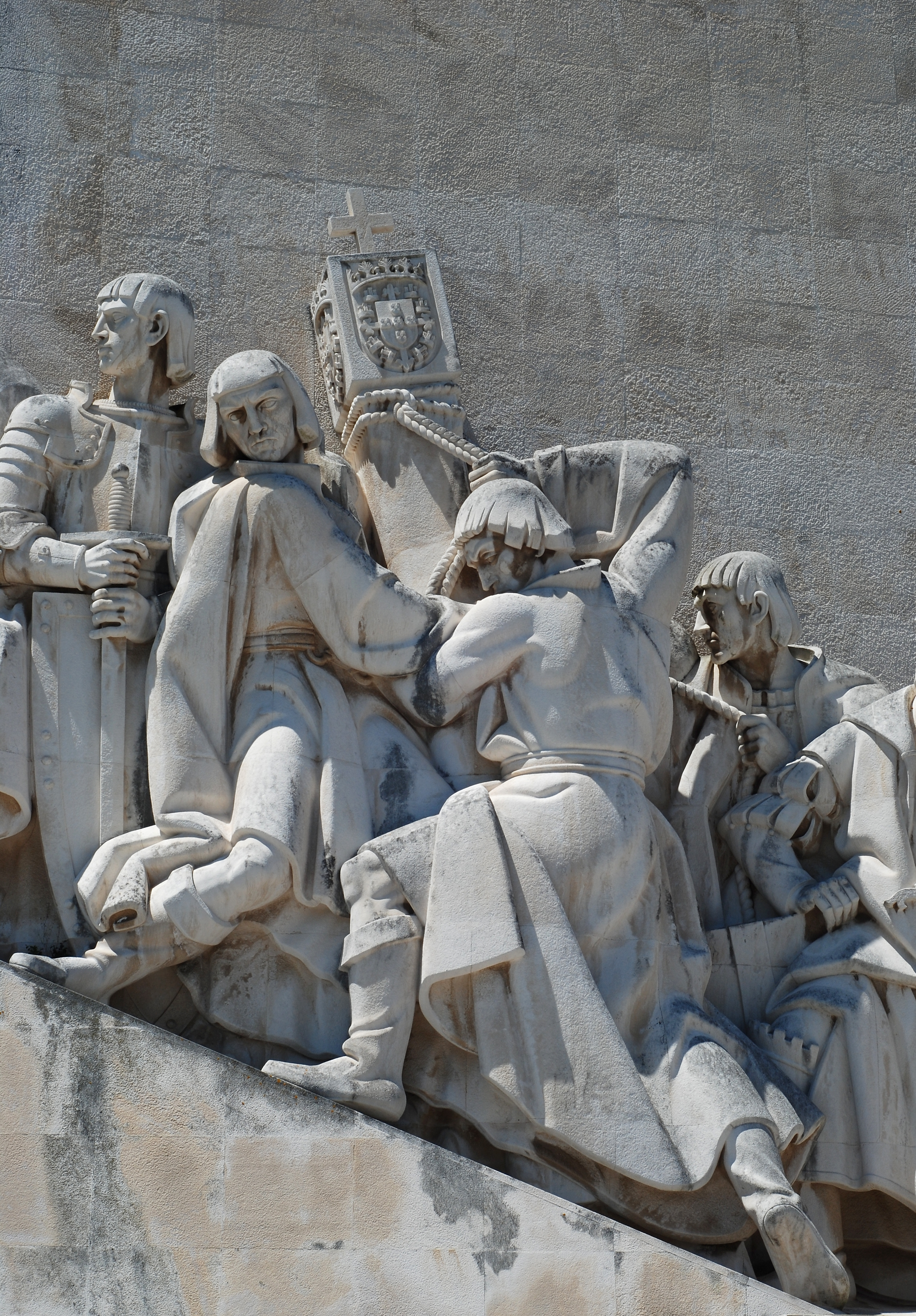
Detail showing Estêvão da Gama (far left) and António de Abreu (far right), Bartolomeu Dias (centre left) and Diogo Cão (centre right) raise a padrão/marker

- Afonso V of Portugal
- Vasco da Gama (discoverer of the sea route to India)
- Afonso Gonçalves Baldaia (navigator)
- Pedro Álvares Cabral (discoverer of Brazil)
- Ferdinand Magellan (first to circumnavigate the globe)
- Nicolau Coelho (navigator)
- Gaspar Corte-Real (navigator)
- Martim Afonso de Sousa (navigator)
- João de Barros (writer)
- Estêvão da Gama (sea captain)
- Bartolomeu Dias (first to cross over the Cape of Good Hope)
- Diogo Cão (first to arrive to the Congo River)
- António de Abreu (navigator)
- Afonso de Albuquerque (second viceroy of Portuguese India)
- Saint Francis Xavier (missionary)
- Cristóvão da Gama (captain)

Western profile

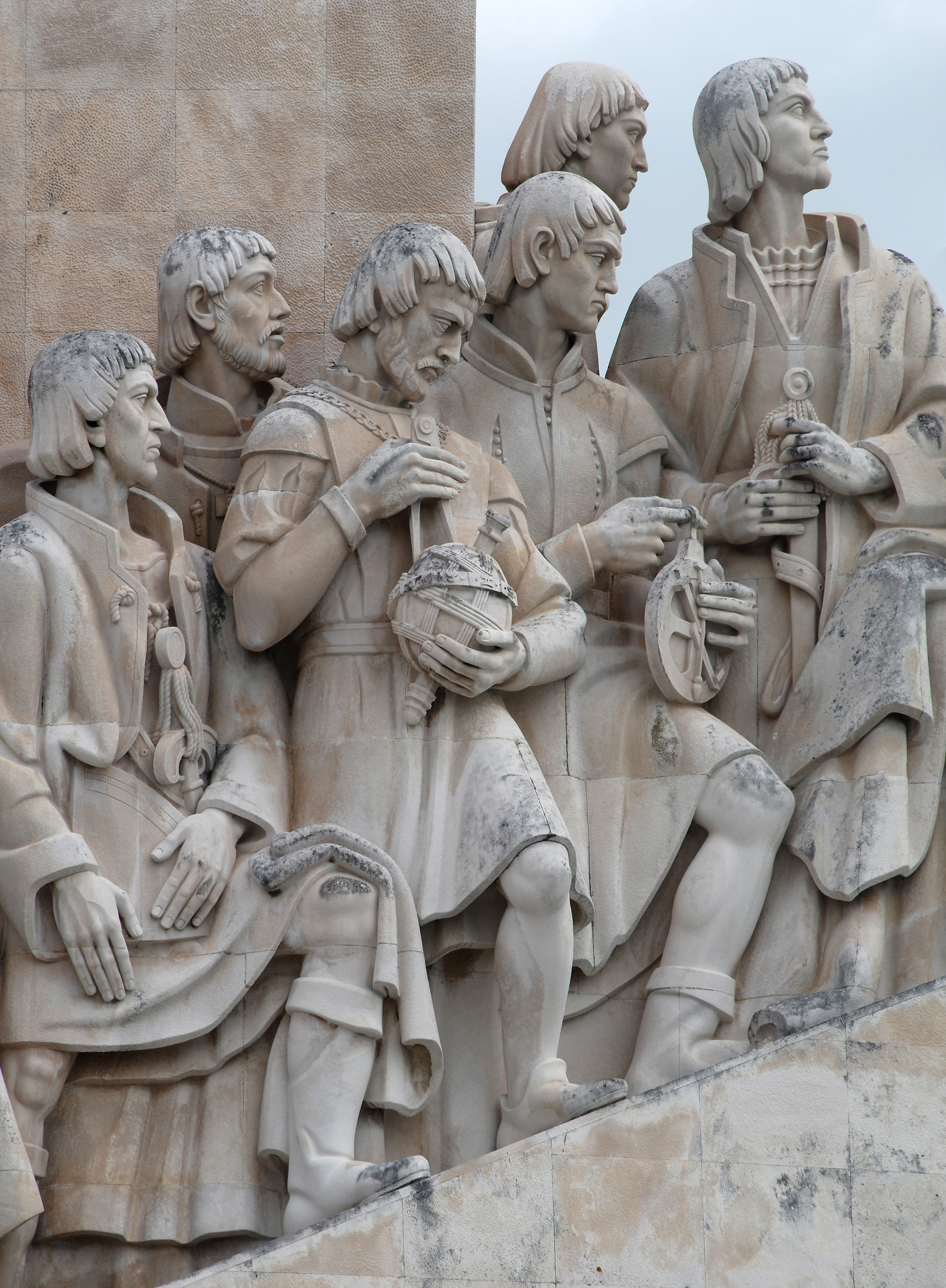
Detail showing Pedro Nunes holding an armillary sphere (center). To his left, Jácome de Maiorca and Pedro Escobar; to his right, Pero de Alenquer, Gil Eanes and João Gonçalves Zarco.

- Peter, Duke of Coimbra (son of King John I of Portugal)
- Queen Philippa of Lancaster
- Fernão Mendes Pinto (explorer and writer)
- Frei Gonçalo de Carvalho, O.P. (Dominican missionary)
- Frei Henrique de Coimbra, O.F.M. (Franciscan missionary)
- Luís de Camões (renaissance poet who celebrated the navigations in the epic Lusiads)
- Nuno Gonçalves (painter)
- Gomes Eanes de Zurara (chronicler)
- Pero da Covilhã (traveller)
- Jácome de Maiorca (Jehudà Cresques, cartographer)
- Pedro Escobar (pilot)
- Pedro Nunes (mathematician)
- Pero de Alenquer (pilot)
- Gil Eanes (navigator)
- João Gonçalves Zarco (navigator)
- Ferdinand the Holy Prince (son of King John I of Portugal)

== In popular culture ==
- The monument was featured in Lisa Stansfield's music video for the single "Change", where she is seen walking up and down the eastern ledge.
- The monument was featured on the 23rd season of the American reality competition series The Amazing Race, where the mappa mundi was used as part of a challenge where contestants had to measure the route that Ferdinand Magellan sailed across the world.
