= Cristóvão da Gama =

16th-century Portuguese military commander

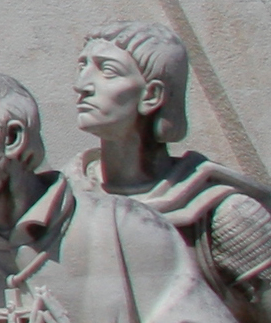
- Effigy of Cristóvão da Gama in the Padrão dos Descobrimentos, in Lisbon, Portugal
- Born: Cristóvão da Gama c. 1516; Sines, Kingdom of Portugal
- Died: 29 August 1542 (aged 25–26); Ofla, Adal Sultanate
- Occupation: Military commander
- Known for: Leader of a Portuguese military expedition in Ethiopia
- Parent(s): Vasco da Gama; Catarina de Ataíde

Signature
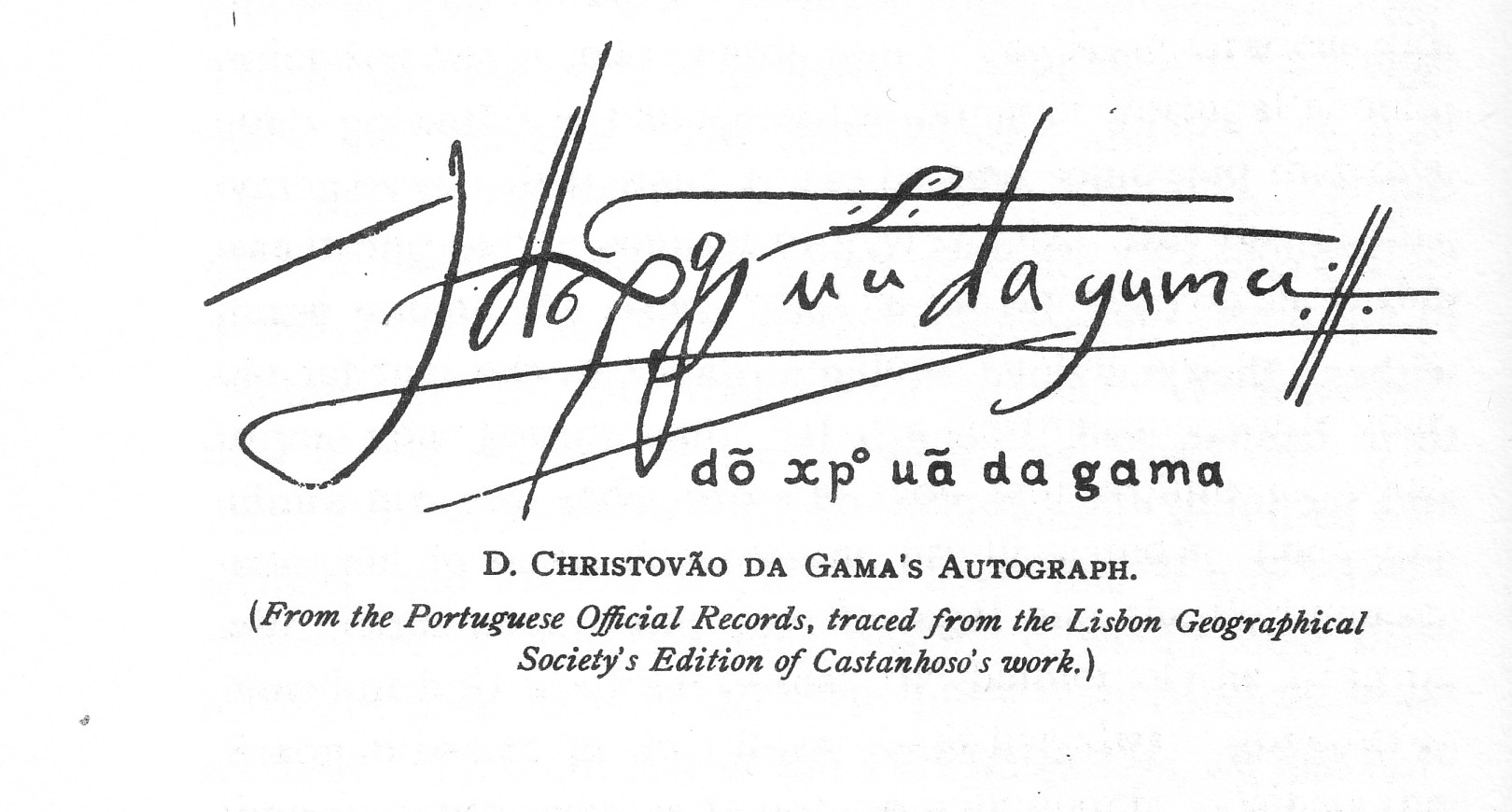

Cristóvão da Gama (c. 1516 – 29 August 1542), anglicised as Christopher da Gama, was a Portuguese military commander who led an army of 400 musketeers on a crusade in Ethiopia (1541–1543) against the Muslim Adal army of Ahmad ibn Ibrahim al-Ghazi. He was the son of explorer Vasco da Gama.

He, along with the allied Ethiopian army, was victorious against Adal forces in four battles. He was seriously wounded in his last battle and was captured, tortured, and executed by Imam Ahmad. Richard Burton, in his 1856 book First Footsteps in East Africa, called Gama "the most chivalrous soldier of a chivalrous age".

== Early career ==
Cristóvão (or Christopher) da Gama was the son of navigator Vasco da Gama and the younger brother of Estêvão da Gama. He first went to India in 1532 with his brother, returned to Portugal in 1535, and then joined Garcia de Noronha in sailing to Diu on 6 April 1538. Many times in these travels he demonstrated a quick mind that saved his companions. In recognition of his usefulness, in 1541, his brother Estêvão, then Viceroy of India, gave him command of a ship in the fleet Estêvão led into the Red Sea against the Ottoman naval base at Suez. He was defeated along with his brother in the ensuing battle against the Ottoman Empire.

== Ethiopian campaign ==
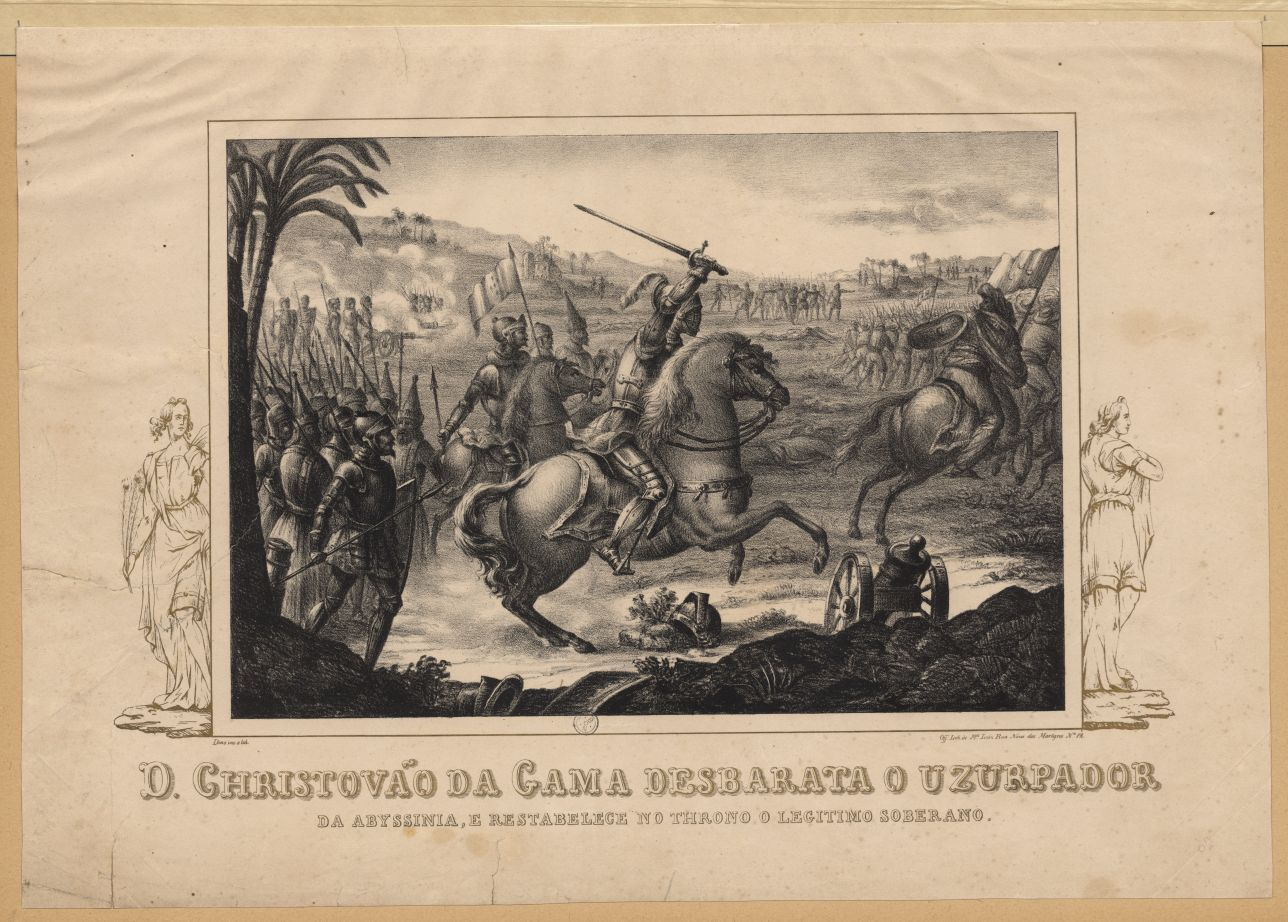
Engraving of Cristovão da Gama chasing the "usurper" in Abyssinia

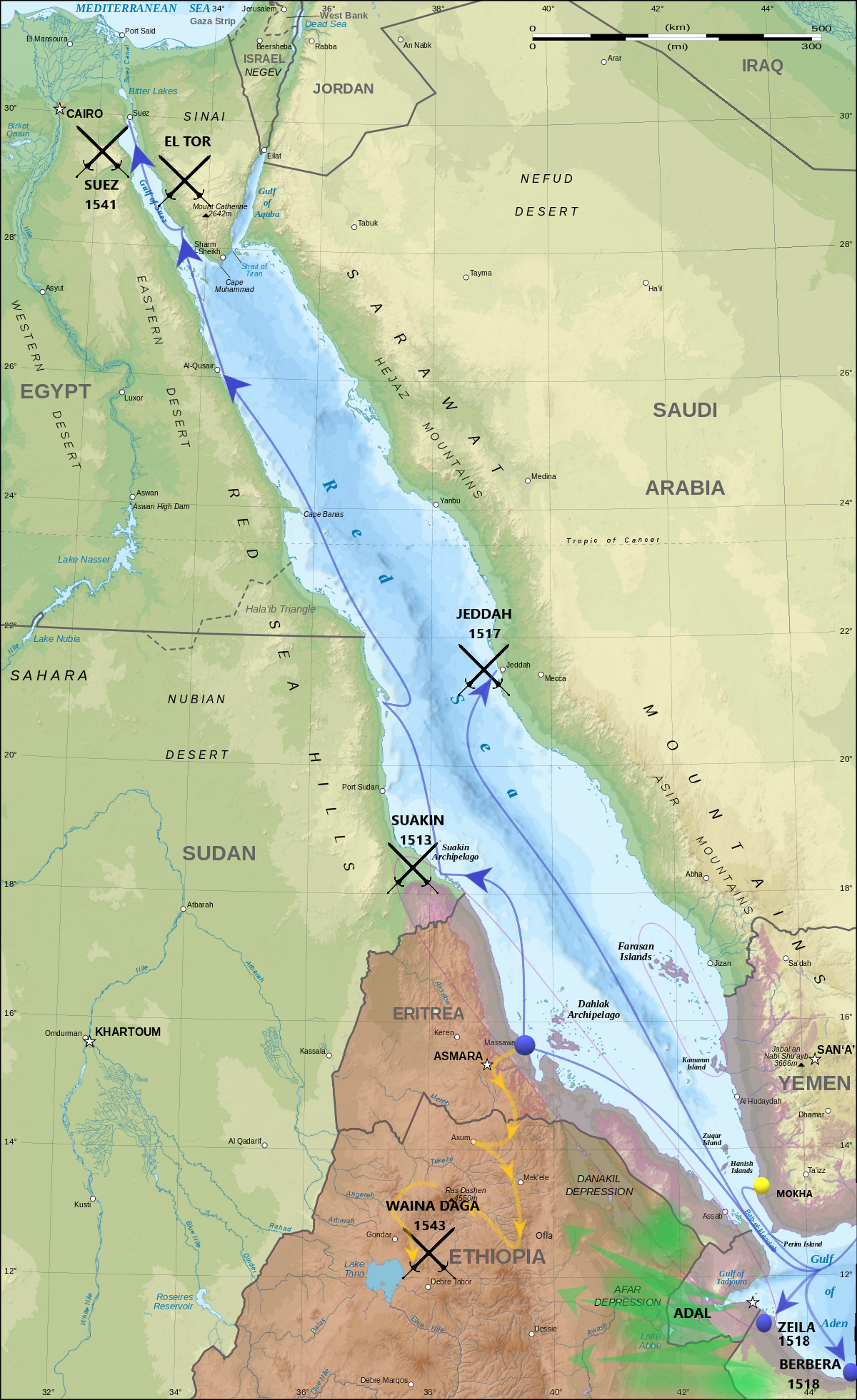
Map of the Portuguese campaigns in the Red Sea and inland Ethiopia during the 16th century.

After this defeat at the hands of the Ottomans, he returned with his brother back to Massawa on 22 May 1541 to rejoin the ships they had left there. While at Massawa, his brother Estêvão da Gama attempted to salvage something from this expedition by dispatching an expeditionary force under Cristóvão to assist the beleaguered Emperor of Ethiopia, Gelawdewos. Four hundred Portuguese men-at-arms were selected, 70 of whom were also skilled artisans or engineers, and 130 slaves for this expedition, equipped with about 1000 arquebuses, an equal number of pikes and several bombards. João Bermudes, who had represented himself as the Patriarch of Ethiopia to the Portuguese, accompanied this expedition. An account of this campaign in the Ethiopian Highlands was later written by Miguel de Castanhoso, who accompanied Gama and was an eye-witness to almost everything he recorded. The men were landed at Massawa and Arqiqo, the next port south of Massawa, and began their trek inland to Debarwa, the capital of the Bahr negus, or Ethiopian viceroy for the northern provinces.

The Portuguese reached Debarwa after a march of 11 days on 20 July, to learn that the rainy season (which Castanhoso, as well as the natives, referred to as "winter") made further travel impossible. Cristóvão would not allow his men to pass the months in idleness, employing them in constructing sledges for the bombards and in raiding nearby villages that had accepted Ahmed Gragn's rule. He also learned from the Bahr negus that Queen Seble Wongel was camped nearby on top of a mountain that Ahmed had not been able to reduce by siege. (R.S. Whiteway identifies this mountain with Debre Damo.) With 100 men, he marched to the mountain, and invited Queen Seble Wongel to join him; she did so, bringing her entourage of 30 men and 50 women, all of whom were received with careful ceremony.

Once the rains ended, the Portuguese continued south. After months of being slowed by their equipment, Da Gama decided to leave half of it in an arsenal on Debre Damo. His army passed the Church of St. Romanos around Christmas of 1541, and celebrated Epiphany in the province of Agame (January 1542). Gama's first encounter with the Imam's troops was 2 February 1542 at the Battle of Bacente, which Whiteway located on Amba Senayt in Haramat. The invaders had taken possession of a hill from which they made raids into the countryside. Although Queen Seble Wongel advised Gama to march around this hill, advising him to wait until her son Emperor Gelawdewos could arrive from Shewa and join him, he believed that failing to engage the invaders would make the natives distrust his troops, and that they would then stop bringing food and supplies. Fortunately, the engagement was an unquestioned success, and Gama's men took the hill despite superior enemy numbers, losing only eight men.

At the end of February, two Portuguese arrived from a ship anchored at Massawa, escorted by six people native to the area. Gama responded with a detachment of 40 men to make contact, obtain supplies, and exchange news. This group failed to reach the ship before it sailed, and the only outcome was that these soldiers and their captain were absent for the next battle, which was against Ahmad Gragn himself.

As Queen Seble Wongel had feared, the events at Bacente alerted Ahmad that a hostile army had entered the area, and he marched north to confront it, meeting Gama at Jarte (which Pedro Paez identifies with Sahart, although Whiteway locates it in the Wajirat Mountains). The Imam made the first contact, sending a messenger to Gama to demand that the Portuguese force either leave Ethiopia, join the Imam, or be destroyed. On the Imam's orders, the messenger produced the gift of a monk's habit, an expensive insult to Gama. Gama responded with his own messenger, who delivered "a few lines in Arabic", stating that he had come to Ethiopia "by order of the great Lion of the Sea" and on the "following day he [Ahmad] would see what the Portuguese were worth", and delivered Gama's own insulting gift: a pair of "small tweezers for the eyebrows, and a very large mirror—making him out [to be] a woman."

Cristóvão da Gama and the Portuguese in battle in Ethiopia, 1929 Italian illustration.

Two battles followed these exchanges at Jarte, the first on 4 April and the next on 16 April. The first battle was a victory for the Portuguese, although Gama lost one of his captains: Ahmad Gragn was wounded, which forced his troops to retire to the far side of the plain. The Portuguese, finding their encampment on the battlefield becoming unbearable, moved across the plain next to the enemy camp, which led to the second battle. This time, the Adal-Ottoman army was even more soundly defeated, and according to Castanhoso, "The victory would have been complete this day had we only [had] a hundred horses to finish it."

Ahmad was forced to retreat further south, where with fortune against him, the local population now openly defied him by refusing to provide him supplies or soldiers. Whiteway identifies the Imam's refuge as a village named Wajarat, while J. Spencer Trimingham places it in the Zobil mountains overlooking the Afar Depression. Gama marched after him as far as Lake Ashangi, where on the advice of Queen Seble Wongel, he made camp on a hill in Wofla as the rainy season started.

At some point late in the rains, Gama was approached by a Jew (possibly one of the Beta Israel), who told him of a mountain stronghold that Ahmad Gragn's followers controlled weakly (identified by Whiteway as Amba Sel). It was also at this time that Gama was accurately informed about the Emperor Gelawdewos's true strength: the Ethiopian monarch was living as an outlaw in the south, with only 60 to 70 men in his army. However, the mountain was the major barrier between the two allies, and Gama also learned that the garrison had a large number of horses—a resource he had badly needed at the second battle of Jarte. Gama swiftly marched south with about 100 men and seized control of the mountain.

Leaving 30 men behind to bring the horses, Gama led his victorious men back to Wofla, to find Ahmad Gragn in position to attack that next morning. Having successfully petitioned the governor of Zabid in South Arabia, as well as offering "much money" and submission to the official, Gragn received 2900 musketeers (2000 from Arabia and 900 handpicked Ottomans), many more than Gama had. The Portuguese were heavily defeated on 28 August at the Battle of Wofla, with only 170 surviving the assault (counting the 30 men escorting the horses from the Hill of the Jews). Gama, his arm broken from a bullet, was captured that night with 14 companions by an Adal patrol. A British historian Clements Markham claimed in the 19th century that Gama's capture was due to his refusal to retreat in order to find an attractive lady with whom he had fallen in love, after capturing her at the Battle of the Hill of the Jews.

== Gama's death and aftermath ==
Cristóvão da Gama was brought to Ahmed Gragn's camp, where the Imam produced the tweezers Gama had given him and began to pluck out his beard. There Gama was tortured in an attempt to force him to convert to Islam. Castanhoso's—and Jerónimo Lobo's account after him—describe Gama's fortitude and death in language worthy of a hagiography, complete with miracles. In the end Ahmad Gragn chopped off Gama's head and tossed it into a nearby spring, whose waters Castanhoso reported gained a reputation for giving "health to the sick". Lobo elaborates upon this story, claiming that upon hearing of this miracle the Imam had a dead dog tossed into the spring and the spring covered with a cairn of stones; Lobo confirms this detail in describing the account of a party sent to retrieve Gama's remains and send them to his nephew, Vasco da Gama Conde da Vidigueira. (Lobo gives the impression that he accompanied this expedition, but a letter of Manuel de Almeida states otherwise.)

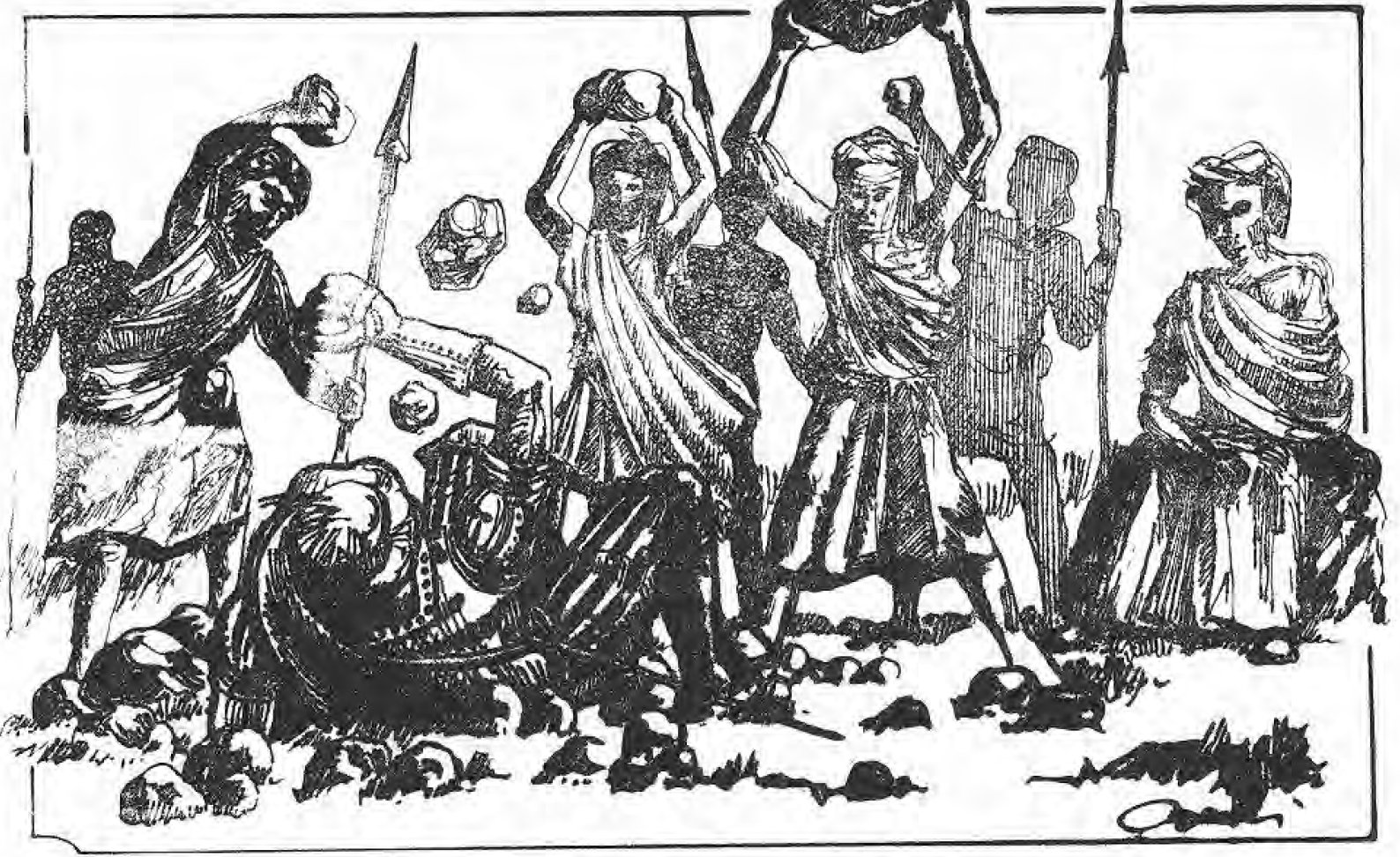
A contemporary 20th century depiction of Cristóvão da Gama's execution

Certain that the surviving Portuguese were scattered, without their firearms, and alone in a foreign land, Ahmad Gragn concluded that this threat was ended, dismissed all but 200 of the foreign musketeers, and proceeded to his camp at Derasge on the shores of Lake Tana. However, over 120 men had joined Queen Seble Wongel, who had taken refuge at the Mountain of the Jews. Ten days later her son, Emperor Gelawdewos, arrived and they took measure of their situation. Using the arms stockpiled at Debre Damo, the Portuguese were able to rearm themselves; with the promise of their ability, Gelawdewos was able to raise a new army, which met Ahmad Gragn at Wayna Daga. The Portuguese musketeers aimed their fire only at the Muslim musketeers, who had played a decisive part at Wofla—and at Imam Ahmad himself. While the sources differ on the exact details, most agree that Ahmad Gragn was killed by the men of Cristóvão da Gama to avenge their commander's death.
