= Estêvão da Gama (16th century) =

Portuguese Navigator

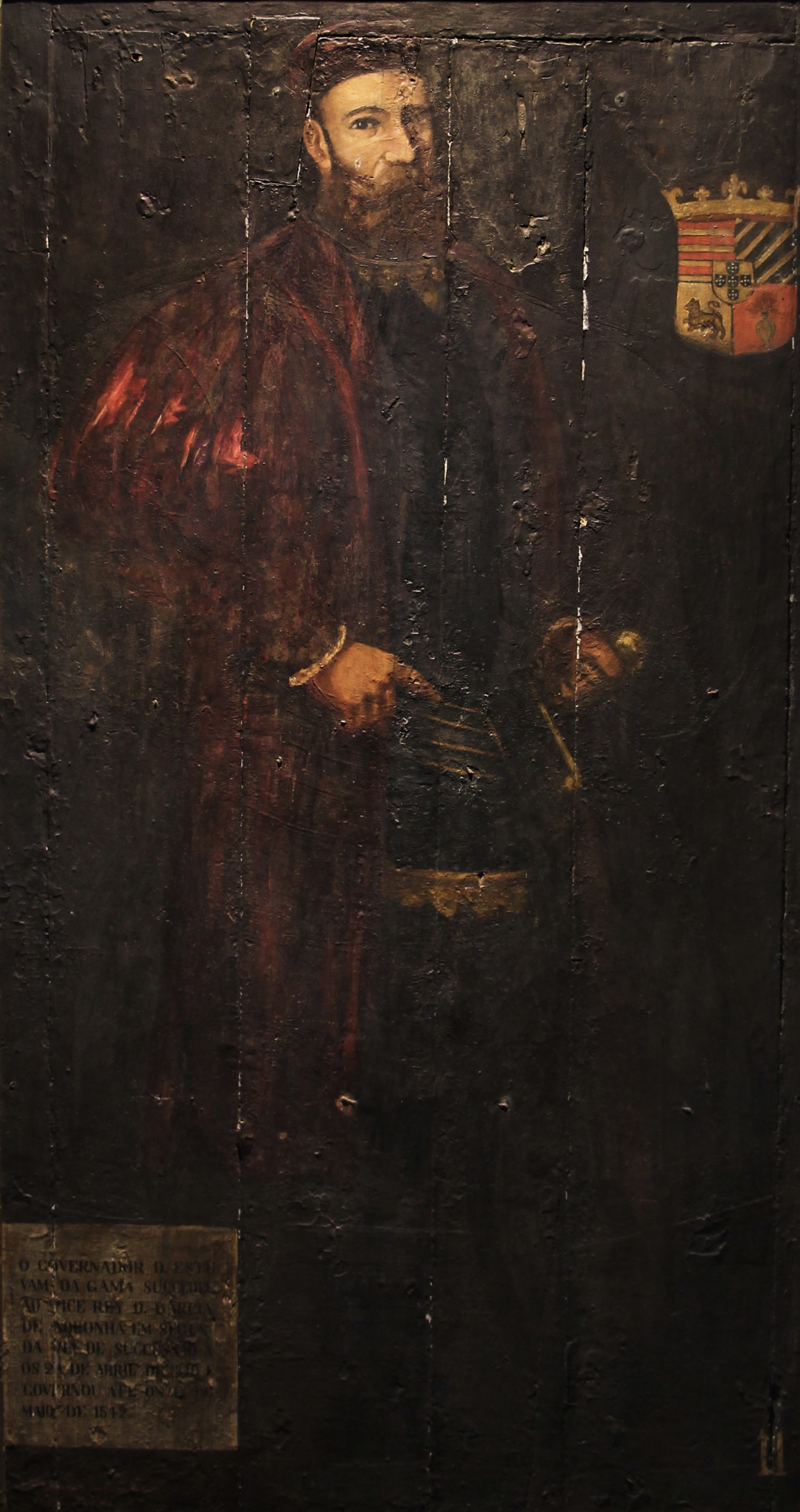

Governor of India
- In office 1540–1542
- Monarch: John III
- Preceded by: Garcia de Noronha
- Succeeded by: Martim Afonso de Sousa

Personal details
- Born: 1505 Kingdom of Portugal
- Died: 1576 (age 71–72) Lisbon, Kingdom of Portugal

Military service
- Allegiance: Portuguese Empire
- Battles/wars: Ottoman–Portuguese conflicts (1538–1557)

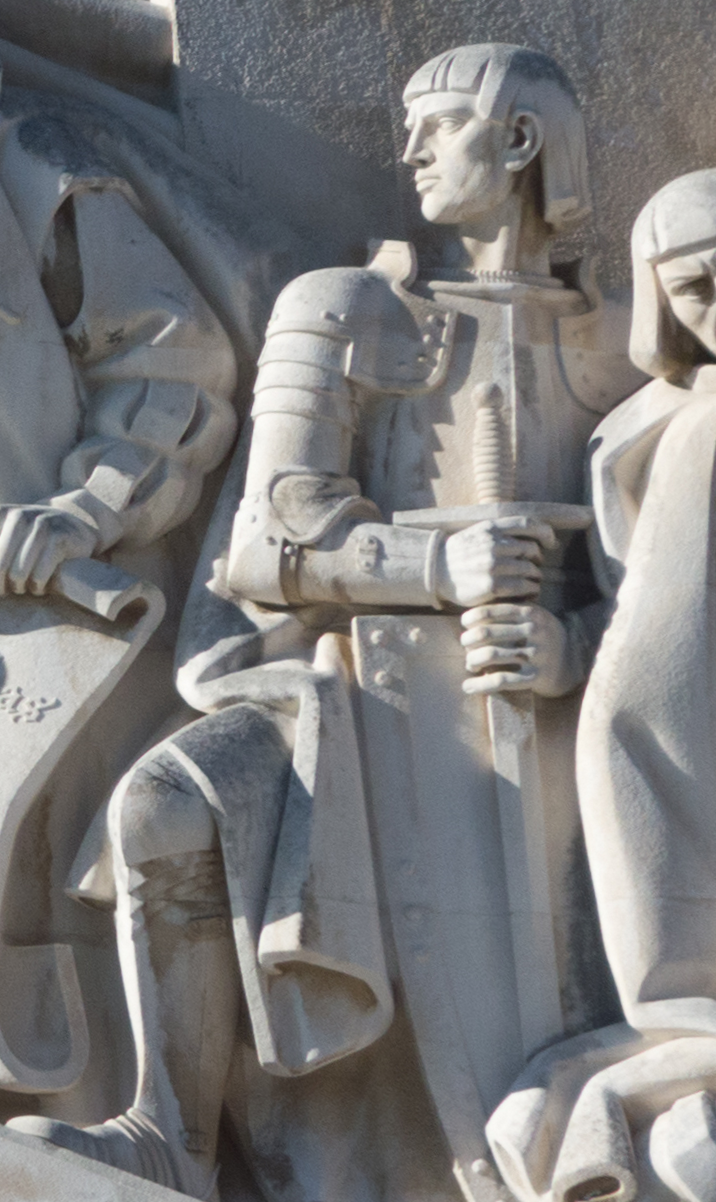
Effigy of Estêvão da Gama in the Monument of the Discoveries, in Lisbon, Portugal.

D. Estêvão da Gama (c. 1505–1576) was the Portuguese governor of Portuguese Gold Coast (1529–1535) and Portuguese India (1540–1542). Named after his paternal grandfather Estêvão da Gama, Estêvão was the second son of Vasco da Gama, and the brother of Cristóvão da Gama.

He commanded the fleet that entered the Red Sea, with the intent of attacking the Ottoman fleet in its harbor at Suez, leaving Goa on 31 December 1540 and reaching Aden on 27 January 1541. The fleet reached Massawa on 12 February, where Gama left a number of ships and continued north. Reaching Suez, he discovered that the Ottomans had long had intelligence of his raid, and foiled his attempt to burn their beached ships. Gama was forced to retrace his steps to Massawa, although pausing to attack the port of El-Tor on the Sinai Peninsula.

Once back at Massawa, Gama found the men he had left were restless and convinced by the self-described patriarch João Bermudes that they should provide military assistance to the beleaguered emperor of Ethiopia. Gama acquiesced to their demands, and landed 400 men, 130 military slaves, and sufficient supplies for them at Massawa and the nearby port of Arqiqo under the charge of his brother Cristóvão, before departing for India on 9 July.

== Campaign in Ethiopia ==
In 1541, Estêvão da Gama, led a military expedition to Ethiopia to aid the Christian emperor Gelawdewos against the Muslim forces of Imam Ahmad ibn Ibrahim al-Ghazi, known as “Ahmad Gragn” (“the Left-Handed”).

The Portuguese force, about 400 musketeers supported by artillery, landed at Massawa and marched inland through the rugged Ethiopian highlands. Despite harsh conditions, attrition, and clashes along the way, they eventually joined the Ethiopian royal army. The combined forces engaged Ahmad Ibrahim at the Battle of Wayna Daga in February 1543. In the fierce combat that followed, Ahmad was killed, and his army was routed, securing a decisive Christian victory that ended the Muslim advance and preserved the independence of the Ethiopian kingdom.

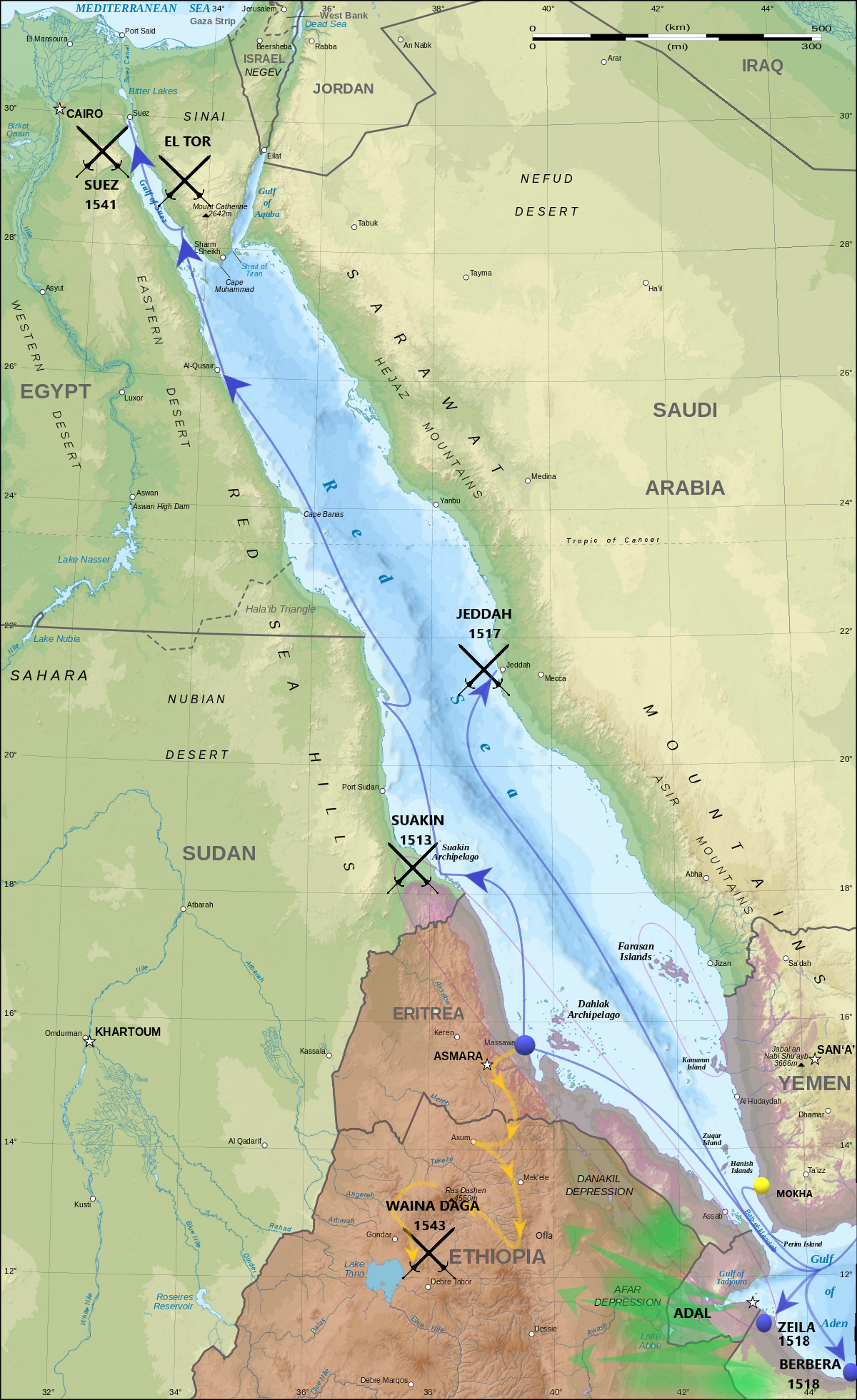
Map of the Portuguese campaigns in the Red Sea and inland Ethiopia during the 16th century.

== Cultural depiction ==
- Estêvão da Gama appears in the 2011 Indian film Urumi, portrayed by the American actor Alexx O'Nell.
