= Ottoman–Portuguese confrontations =

Series of military encounters between Portuguese and Ottoman Empire in medieval age

The Ottoman–Portuguese or the Turco-Portuguese confrontations refers to a series of different military encounters between the Portuguese Empire and the Ottoman Empire, or between other European powers and the Ottoman Empire in which relevant Portuguese military forces participated. Some of these conflicts were brief, while others lasted for many years. Most of these conflicts took place in the Indian Ocean, in the process of the expansion of the Portuguese Empire, but also in the Red Sea. These conflicts also involved regional powers, after 1538 the Adal Sultanate, with the aid of the Ottoman Empire, fought against the Ethiopian Empire, which was supported by the Portuguese, under the command of Cristóvão da Gama, the son of the famous explorer Vasco da Gama. This war is known as the Ethiopian–Adal war.

== Conflicts ==
- Siege of Jeddah
- Battle of al-Shihr (1531)
- Siege of Diu (1531)
- Conquest of Tunis (1535)
- Ottoman–Portuguese conflicts (1538–1560)
  - Siege of Diu (1538)
  - Battle of Suakin (1541)
  - Battle of El Tor
  - Battle of Suez (1541)
  - Attack on Jeddah (1541)
  - Battle of Jarte
  - Battle of Wofla
  - Battle of Wayna Daga
  - Siege of Diu (1546)
  - Battle of Bab el Mandeb
  - Siege of Qatif (1551)
  - Ottoman campaign against Hormuz
  - Capture of Muscat (1552)
  - Battle of the Bay of Velez
  - Battle of the Strait of Hormuz (1553)
  - Battle of the Gulf of Oman
  - Action at Diu
  - Red Sea campaign (1556)
  - Attack on Mocha
  - Siege of Bahrain
  - Battle of Kamaran
- Conquest of the Peñón de Vélez de la Gomera (1564)
- Siege of Malacca (1568)
- Capture of Muscat (1581)
- Ottoman–Portuguese conflicts (1586–1589)
  - Battle of Mombasa (1589)
- Sack of Madeira
- Ottoman–Venetian War (1714–1718)
  - Battle of Matapan
- Spanish–Algerian War (1775–1785)
  - Bombardment of Algiers (1784)
- Action of 26 May 1789
- Action of 15 August 1799
- Action of 27 May 1802
