= List of cities besieged by the Ottoman Empire =

Cities attacked by Ottoman forces

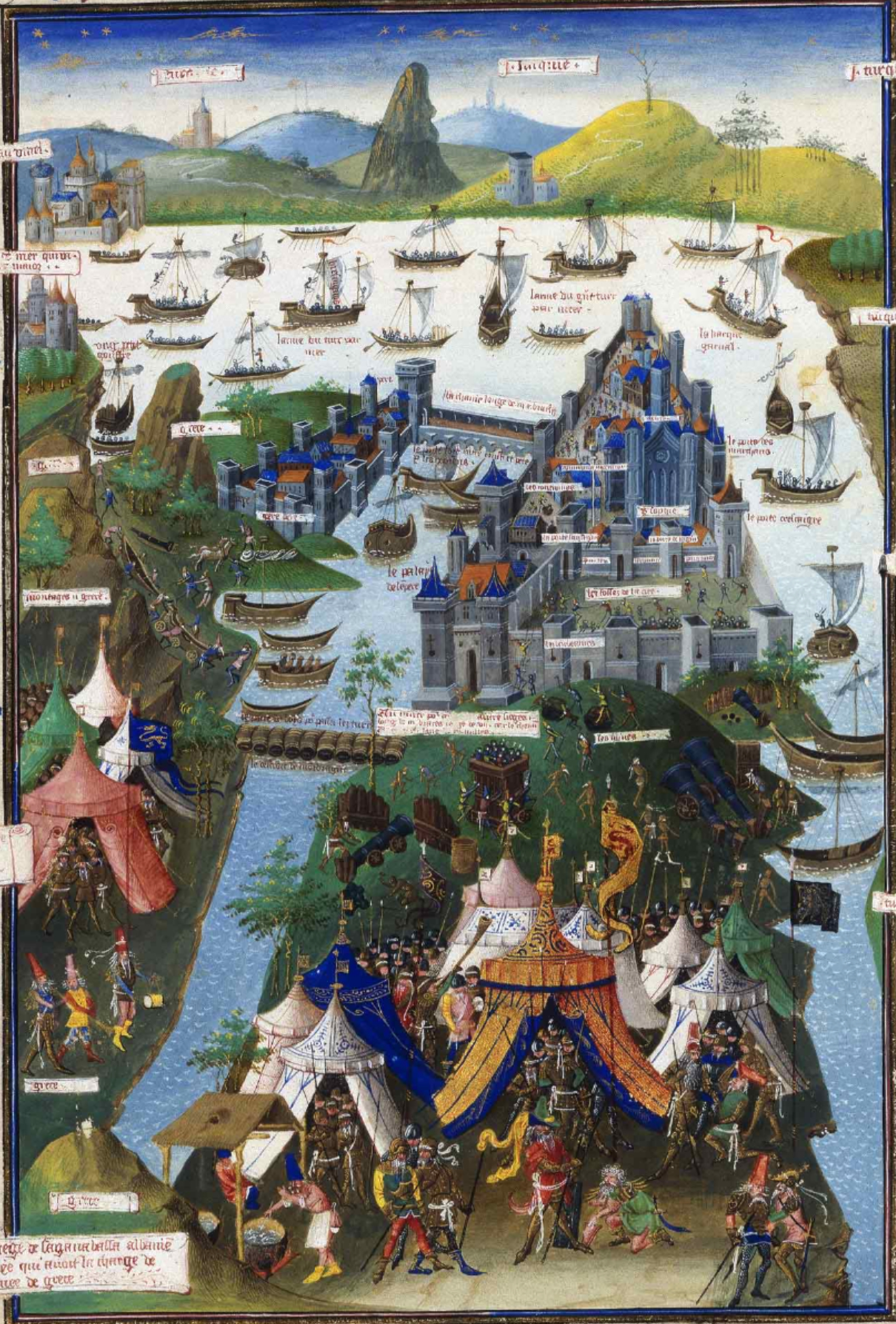
Siege of Constantinople,1453

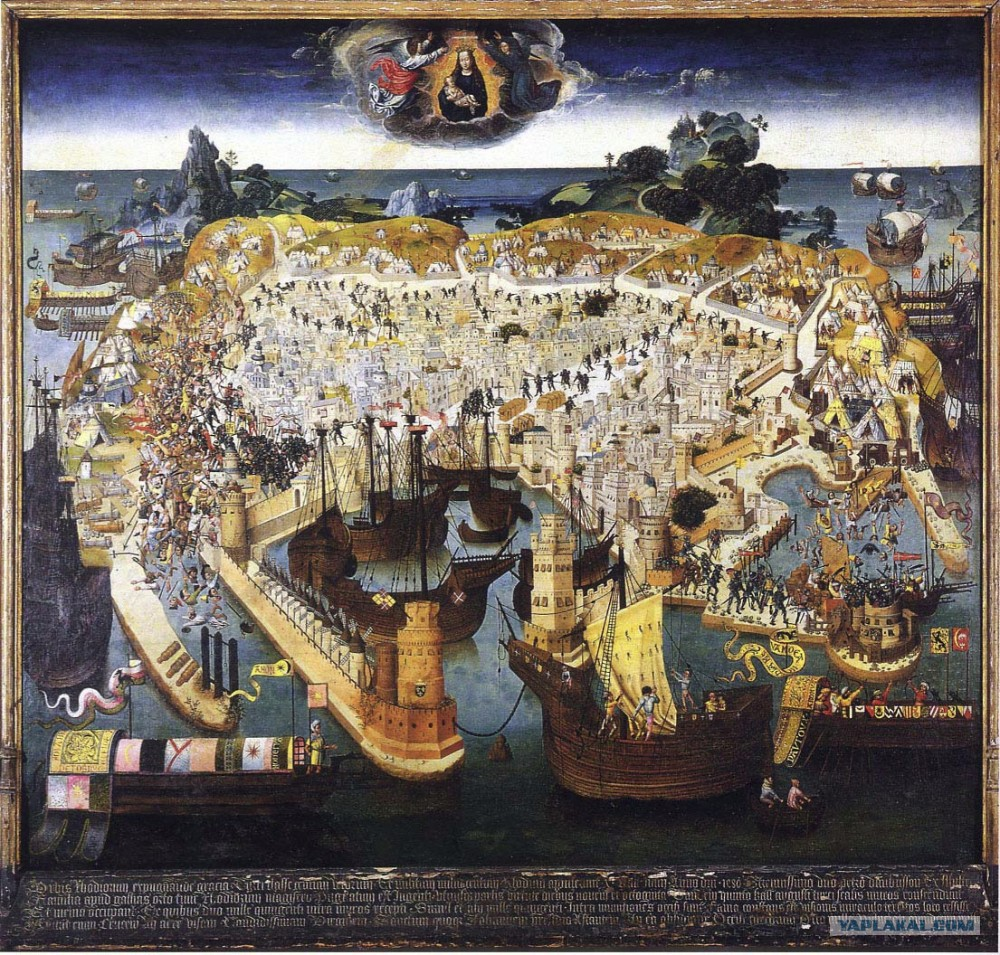
Siege of Rhodes, 1480

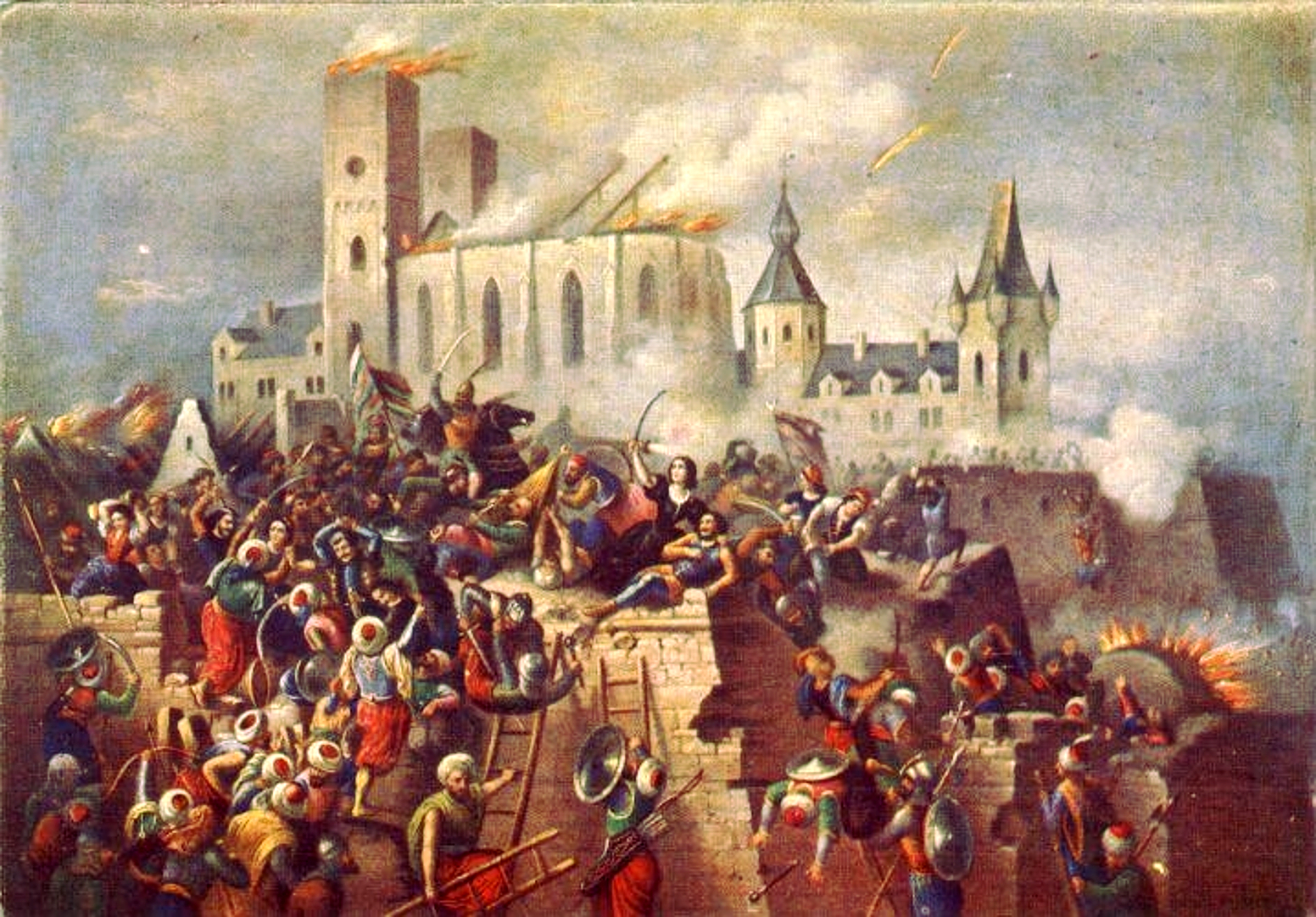
Siege of Eger Castle, 1552

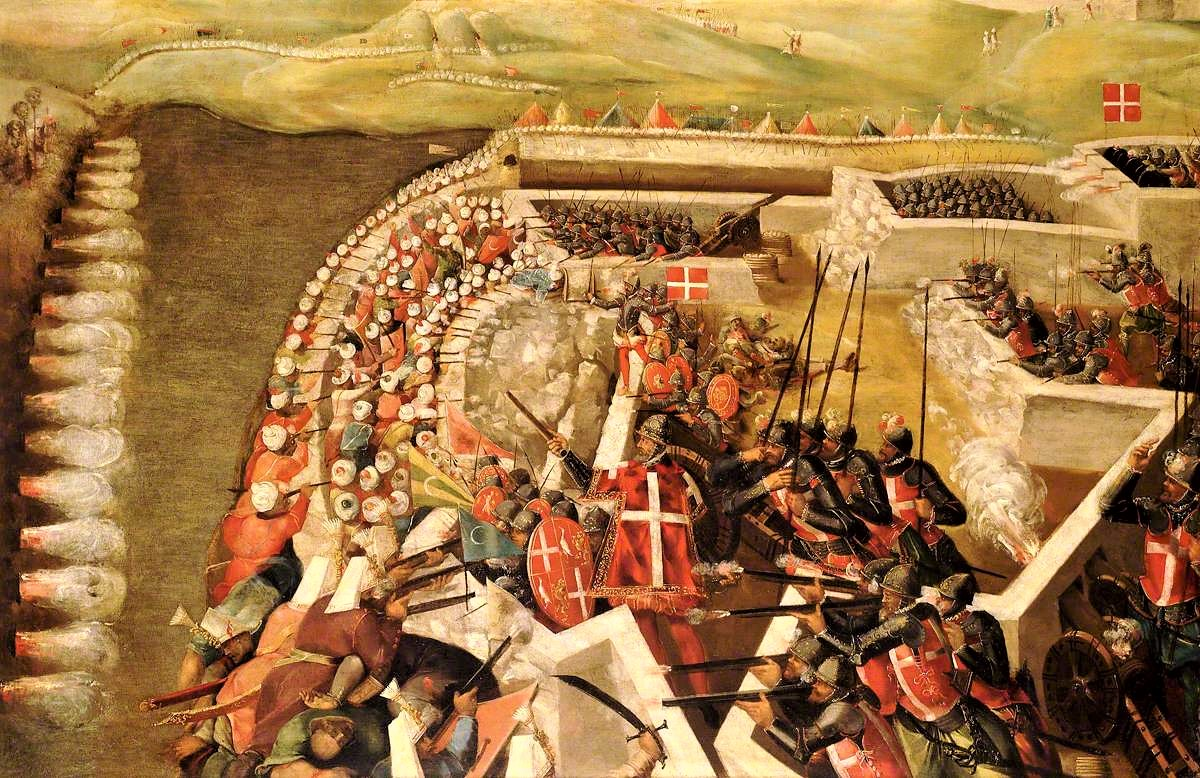
Great Siege of Malta, 1565

Below is the list of cities which were besieged by the Ottoman Empire.

Year	City	State	Modern City	Modern state
1285	Kulaca Hisar	Byzantine Empire	İnegöl	Turkey
1288	Karacahisar	Byzantine Empire	Eskişehir	Turkey
1326	Prusa	Byzantine Empire	Bursa	Turkey
1331	Nicaea	Byzantine Empire	Iznik	Turkey
1337	Nicomedia	Byzantine Empire	Izmit	Turkey
1361	Adrianople	Byzantine Empire	Edirne	Turkey
1393	Tarnovo	Bulgarian Empire	Veliko Tarnovo	Bulgaria
1422	Constantinople	Byzantine Empire	Istanbul	Turkey
1422	Thessalonica	Byzantine Empire	Thessaloniki	Greece
1448	Svetigrad	League of Lezhë	near Debar	North Macedonia
1453	Constantinople	Byzantine Empire	Istanbul	Turkey
1456	Nándorfehérvár	Kingdom of Hungary	Belgrade	Serbia
1461	Trebizond	Empire of Trebizond	Trabzon	Turkey
1462	Mytilene	House of Gattilusi	Mytilene	Greece
1478	Krujë	League of Lezhë	Krujë	Albania
1480	Rhodes	Knights Hospitaller	Rhodes	Greece
1481	Otranto	Kingdom of Naples	Otranto	Italy
1517	Cairo	Mamluk Sultanate	Cairo	Egypt
1522	Rhodes	Knights Hospitaller	Rhodes	Greece
1529	Algiers	Kabyles, Spanish Empire	Algiers	Algeria
1529	Vienna	Habsburg Austria	Vienna	Austria
1532	Güns	Kingdom of Hungary	Kőszeg	Hungary
1534	Tunis	Hafsid dynasty	Tunis	Tunisia
1534	Baghdad	Safavid Persia	Baghdad	Iraq
1537	Corfu	Republic of Venice	Corfu	Greece
1537	Klis	Kingdom of Croatia	Klis	Croatia
1538	Diu	Portuguese Empire	Diu	India
1539	Castelnuovo	Spanish Empire	Herceg Novi	Montenegro
1541	Buda	Kingdom of Hungary	Buda	Hungary
1541	Algiers	Ottoman Algeria	Algiers	Algeria
1543	Nice	House of Savoy	Nice	France
1543	Esztergom	Kingdom of Hungary	Esztergom	Hungary
1547	Van	Safavid Empire	Van	Turkey
1548	Aden	Portuguese Empire	Aden	Yemen
1551	Gozo	Knights of Malta	Gozo	Malta
1551	Tripoli	Knights of Malta	Tripoli	Libya
1552	Hormuz	Portuguese Empire	Hormuz	Iran
1552	Muscat	Portuguese Empire	Muscat	Oman
1552	Eger	Kingdom of Hungary	Eger	Hungary
1555	Bougie	Spanish Empire	Béjaïa	Algeria
1556	Oran	Spanish Empire	Oran	Algeria
1563	Oran	Spanish Empire	Oran	Algeria
1565	Malta	Knights of Malta	Valletta	Malta
1566	Szigetvar	Kingdom of Hungary	Szigetvár	Hungary
1574	Tunis	Spanish Empire	Tunis	Tunisia
1578	Gvozdansko	Kingdom of Croatia	Gvozdansko	Croatia
1593	Sisak	Kingdom of Croatia	Sisak	Croatia
1606	Ganja	Safavid Persia	Ganja	Azerbaijan
1596	Eger	Habsburg Austria	Eger	Hungary
1638	Baghdad	Safavid Persia	Baghdad	Iraq
1663	Uyvar	Nové Zámky	Habsburg Austria	Slovakia
1664	Novi Zrin	Kingdom of Croatia	Donja Dubrava	Croatia
1669	Candia	Republic of Venice	Iraklion	Greece
1672	Podilskyi (Kamaniçe)	Poland-Lithuania	Kamianets-Podilskyi	Ukraine
1683	Vienna	Habsburg Austria	Vienna	Austria
1739	Belgrade	Habsburg Austria	Belgrade	Serbia
