= Capture of Muscat (1552) =

Part of Ottoman campaign against Hormuz

- Part of the Ottoman campaign against Hormuz and Ottoman–Portuguese conflicts (1538–1559)
- Map of the Ottoman campaign against Hormuz.
Date	August 1552
Location	Muscat, Oman 23.608611°N 58.591944°E
Result	Ottoman victory

Belligerents
Portuguese Empire	Ottoman Empire

Commanders and leaders
João de Lisboa	Piri Reis; Seydi Ali Reis

Strength
60 troops	25 galleys 1,200 troops (4 galleons 25 galleys 850 troops)

Casualties and losses
60 prisoners	Unknown
- Location within Oman

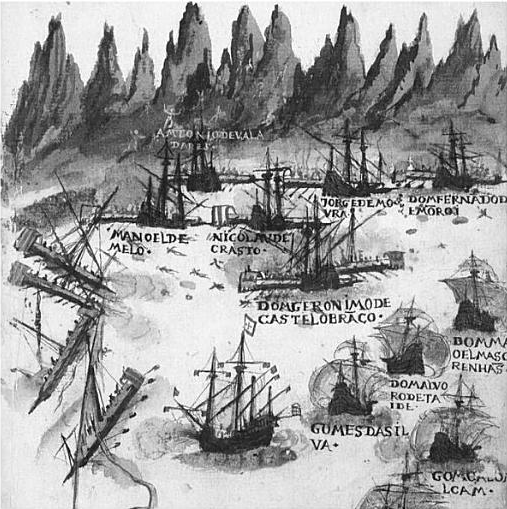
Seydi Ali Reis and his galleys taken in an ambush by Portuguese forces while trying to bring back his fleet from Basra to Suez in August 1554.

The capture of Muscat occurred in 1552, when an Ottoman fleet under Piri Reis attacked Old Muscat, in modern Oman, and plundered the town from the Portuguese. These events followed the important Ottoman defeat in the third siege of Diu in 1546, which put a stop to their attempts in India, but also the successful capture of Aden in 1548, which allowed the Ottomans to resist the Portuguese in the northwestern part of the Indian Ocean.

== Background ==
The city, once part of the Kingdom of Hormuz, had been in Portuguese hands since 1507, when a Portuguese fleet under Afonso de Albuquerque attacked the city, destroyed it, and then came back soon after to occupy it.

The Ottomans attempted to intervene against the Portuguese presence, and four Ottoman ships bombarded the city in 1546.

The city was again attacked by the Ottomans in 1552 as part of a broader conflict over the Persian Gulf and Indian Ocean. This time they attacked with a larger fleet under Piri Reis and Seydi Ali Reis. Their ultimate objective was to seize the islands of Hormuz and Bahrain, in order to block Portuguese access to the Persian Gulf and thus reestablish Ottoman control of the Indian Ocean trade.

== Battle ==
The Ottoman force consisted of 4 galleons, 25 galleys, and 850 troops (according to Diogo do Couto, the Ottomans had 15 galleys and 1200 troops). The recently built Fort Al-Mirani was besieged for 18 days with one piece of Ottoman artillery brought on top of a ridge. Lacking food and water, the 60-strong Portuguese garrison and its commander, João de Lisboa, agreed to surrender, only to be taken as captives. The fort was captured and its fortifications destroyed.

Soon however the Ottomans departed. Ultimately, they managed to occupy and control the coasts of Yemen, Aden, and Arabia, as far north as Basra, so as to facilitate their trade with India and block the Portuguese from attacking the Hijaz.

== Aftermath ==
The Ottomans again attacked the Portuguese possessions of the coast of India in 1553, with a raid on the Pearl Fishery Coast of South India around Tuticorin. They were assisted by the Marakkar Muslims of Malabar, and had the tacit agreement of Vittula Nayak of Madurai. 52 Portuguese were captured at Punnaikayal, and churches were burnt down. The Ottomans failed however in 1553 against a Portuguese fleet at sea near al-Fahl.

Seydi Ali Reis and his galleys would be attacked in an ambush by Portuguese forces while he was trying to bring back his float from Basra to Suez in August 1554.

Three Ottoman galleys would again occupy Muscat in 1581, letting the population escape, before the city again fell to the Portuguese in 1588.

== See also ==
- Capture of Muscat (1581)
- Ottoman–Portuguese conflicts (1538–1560)
- Ottoman–Portuguese conflicts (1586–1589)
