= Battle of the Strait of Hormuz =

Battle of the Strait of Hormuz or battle off Hormuz may refer to:

- Portuguese conquest of Hormuz (1507)
- Portuguese intervention in Hormuz (1514–1515)
- Ottoman campaign against Hormuz (1552–1554)
- Battle of the Strait of Hormuz (1553)
- Anglo-Persian capture of Hormuz (1622)
- Battle off Hormuz (1625)
- Tanker war (1981–1988), during the Iran–Iraq War
- Operation Praying Mantis (18 April 1988)
- 2026 Strait of Hormuz campaign

== See also ==
- Piracy in the Strait of Hormuz
