= Battle of the Strait of Hormuz (1553) =

1553 Ottoman–Portuguese naval battle

- Part of Ottoman–Portuguese conflicts (1538–1559)
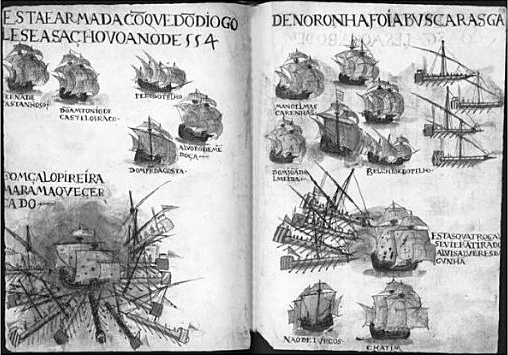
- Battle of the Strait of Hormuz, in Livro de Lisuarte de Abreu
Date	August 1553
Location	Strait of Hormuz
Result	Portuguese victory

Belligerents
(Kingdom of Portugal) Portuguese Empire	Ottoman Empire

Commanders and leaders
(Kingdom of Portugal) Dom Diogo de Noronha	Murat Reis

Strength
6 galleons 9 caravels 25 foists	15 galleys 1 carrack

Casualties and losses
Few	Few

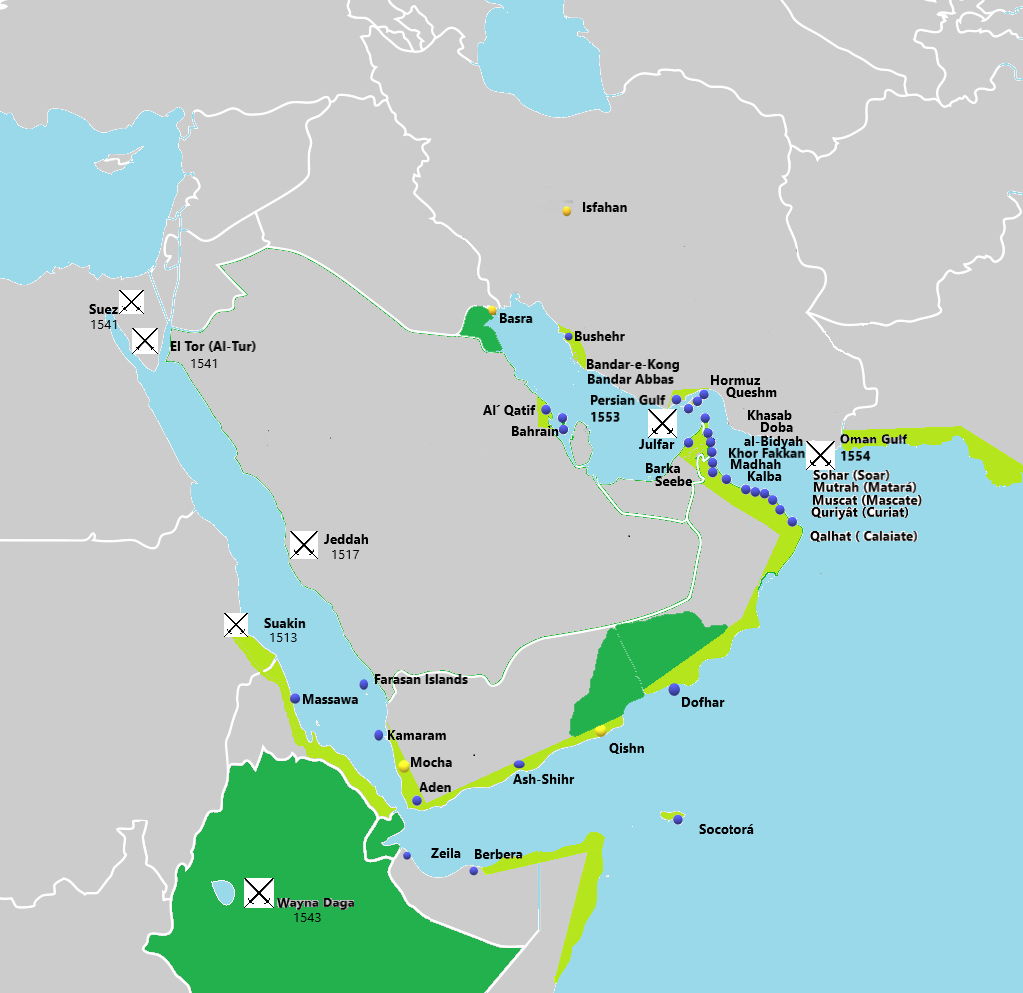
Portuguese in the Persian Gulf and Red Sea. Light green: possessions and main cities. Dark green: protectorate or under influence. Yellow: main factories.

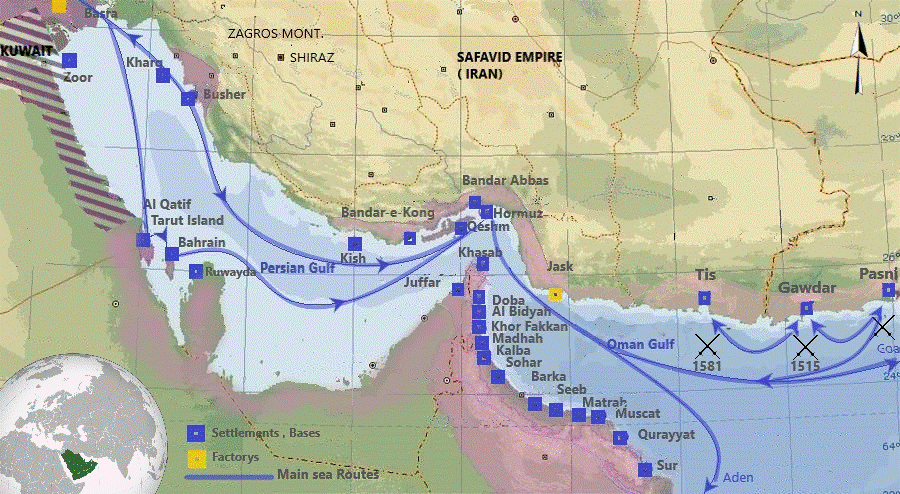
Purple: Portuguese in the Persian Gulf in the 16th and 17th century. Main cities, ports and routes.

The Battle of the Strait of Hormuz was fought in August 1553 between an Ottoman fleet, commanded by Admiral Murat Reis, against a Portuguese fleet of Dom Diogo de Noronha. The Turks were forced to retreat after clashing with the Portuguese.

== Background ==
Piri Reis was beheaded at Constantinople in late 1552 for exceeding the orders he had previously received in conducting the Ottoman campaign against Hormuz, notwithstanding the fact that he presented the Ottoman sultan with all the plunder captured during his mission. Sultan Suleiman the Magnificent had him replaced by Murat Reis, as Ottoman "admiral of the Indian Ocean fleet". Murat Reis had been responsible for the loss of Qatif to the Portuguese in 1551, and he was anxious to recover his reputation.

The mission of Murat Reis was to transfer 15 galleys stationed at Basra to the Red Sea, to firmly secure it against Portuguese incursions. Such a task however, demanded sailing through the Persian Gulf, closely watched and heavily guarded by the Portuguese from their base at Hormuz.

Piri Reis' attack on Muscat and Hormuz the previous year had triggered a Portuguese response from Goa, in the form of 30 galleons and caravels, 70 oar ships, and 3,000 soldiers commanded by the Viceroy himself, Dom Afonso de Noronha. These forces were eventually not needed, but nonetheless, significant reinforcements were detached to secure Hormuz against possible Ottoman attacks in the near future. The Portuguese captain of Hormuz was then Dom António de Noronha, while the sea-captain of Hormuz was Dom Diogo de Noronha. Dom Diogo was joined by the flotilla of Dom Pedro de Ataíde, who had just returned from blockading the mouth of the Red Sea that year.

In May 1553, Dom Diogo set out to sea to patrol the vicinity of Cape Musandam with his main force, while two small craft were dispatched to scout the Shatt al-Arab for Ottoman movements. A few months later, the two craft returned, with information that Murat Reis had departed Basra with 16 vessels and followed close behind, on his way towards the Strait of Hormuz.

== The battle ==
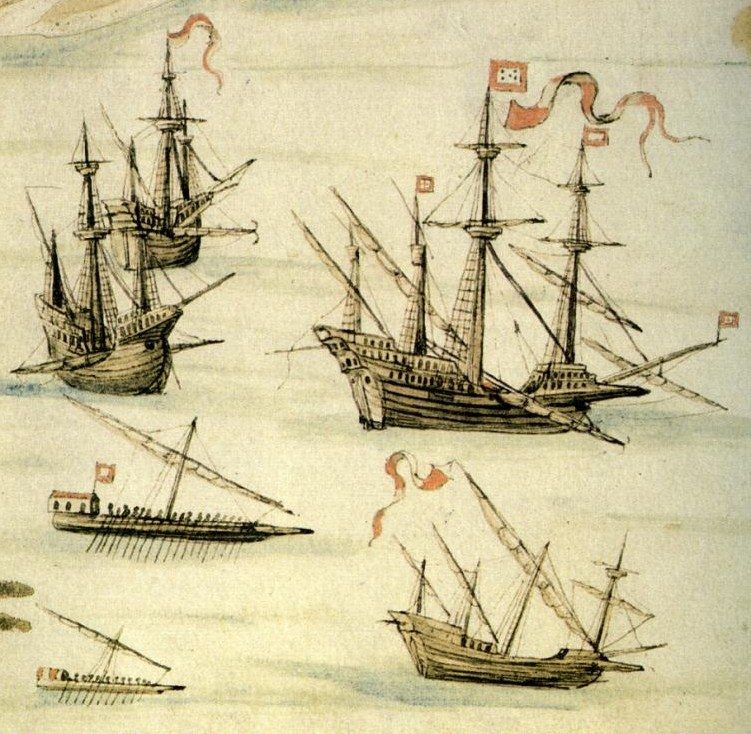
Portuguese vessels used in the Indian Ocean; carracks, galleons, square-rigged caravels, and oarships of several sizes

The Turks sailed in a column close to shore, and as soon as they spotted the Portuguese fleet, attempted to circle it around the north. To allow the galleons and war-caravels to fire broadsides, the Portuguese formed a line – a tactic that in the future would become standard in naval warfare. Murat Reis proved just as skilful commanding his galleys: lacking broadside artillery, he instead would order all his galleys to veer to starboard at the same time, to allow the bow guns to fire at the Portuguese, before resuming course.

One Turkish cannonball pierced the Portuguese flagship below the waterline; at this critical moment, the ship-master performed a risky manoeuvre: shifting direction towards the wind, the galleon tilted, bringing the hole above the waterline and allowing the carpenters to plug it mid-battle.

Towards the end of the morning wind fell, leaving the Portuguese and Ottoman sail vessels immobile, but not the galleys. Possessing himself a carrack which he could not leave behind, Murat Reis took the opportunity to surround an isolated Portuguese galleon, commanded by Gonçalo Pereira Marramaque. For the following six hours, the galleon crew withstood a continuous bombardment, that felled its masts and tore down its fore and aft castles. Yet the Turks were unable to sink it through gunfire alone, or close in for the grapple. Marramaque was always to be found wherever the vessel was most threatened during combat.

At the same time, the Turkish galleys were harassed by the Portuguese foists, which being lighter, did not press with the attack.

As the wind picked up towards evening, the Portuguese galleons and war-caravels once more closed in on the Turkish galleys, and Murat Reis finally disengaged, taking the route back to Basra along the Persian coast.

== Aftermath ==
Coming aboard the battered galleon, Dom Diogo de Noronha applauded its crew for their brave resistance – congratulating the commanding officers last, declaring that they had not but done their duty as expected of nobility of their rank.

Gonçalo Pereira Marramaque was towed back to Hormuz by a few oarships, while Dom Diogo de Noronha set out in pursuit of the Turkish galleys. Since wind blew weak, Murat Reis gained a considerable lead and managed to reach Basra safely within seven days, and Dom Diogo likewise returned to Hormuz and Goa, leaving just a few craft keeping watch at the mouth of the Shatt al Arab.

Following this setback, Murat Reis was dismissed of his command, and replaced with Seydi Ali Reis, who would likewise attempt an incursion across the Persian Gulf the following year.

== See also ==
- Battle of the Gulf of Oman
