= Capture of Muscat (1581) =

1581 Ottoman expedition into Muscat

Sack of Muscat (1581)
- Part of Ottoman–Portuguese conflicts
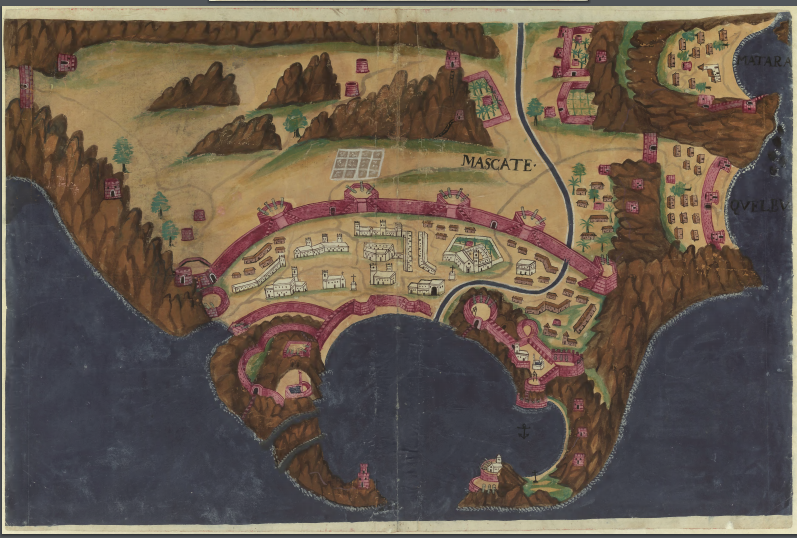
- Portuguese Fortress in Muscat, 17th century.
| Date | Summer 1581 |
| Location | Muscat, Oman |
| Result | Ottoman victory |

Belligerents
| Portuguese Empire | Ottoman Empire |

Commanders and leaders
| Unknown | Mir Ali Beg |

Strength
| Unknown | 150–200 men 3 light galliots |

Casualties and losses
| 3 galliots captured , 150+ men killed. | Unknown |

The capture of Muscat occurred in 1581, when an Ottoman fleet under Mir Ali Beg attacked the Portuguese fort of Muscat and plundered the town from the Portuguese.

== Capture ==
In summer 1581, the Ottoman commander, Mir Ali Beg, who was accustomed to raiding expeditions, launched a daring raid against the Portuguese-held city of Muscat. He had a force of 150 to 200 men and three light galliots. On his arrival in Muscat, Ali Beg landed a party of men near the fort and dispatched his galliots with instructions that once they reached the harbor of the fort, they would heavily bombard it to draw the attention of the inhabitants in their direction, and Ali Beg would attack them from behind, with the support of some local Muslims. The Portuguese were caught off guard, and panic struck them.

Seeing that they were unprepared for any defense, they escaped from the fort, and the Ottomans killed some Portuguese. The inhabitants of the fort—around 500 of them—also joined the Portuguese in the town of Bruxel, a town five leagues inland. Only a few of them escaped with their property, and Ali Beg sacked the city for six days. They were able to collect a vast amount of loot. They also destroyed the church in the fort. The Ottomans captured three Portuguese galliots alongside a king's ransom and stolen merchandise.

News of this success quickly spread throughout the western Indian Ocean, establishing Ali Beg's corsa skills and setting the stage for his future expeditions on the Swahili Coast.

== See also ==
- Capture of Muscat (1552)
- Ottoman–Portuguese conflicts (1538–1560)
- Ottoman–Portuguese conflicts (1586–1589)
