= Ottoman campaign against Hormuz =

1552 Ottoman military campaign

Ottoman campaign against Hormuz (1552–1554)
- Part of Ottoman–Portuguese conflicts (1538–1559)
- Map of Piri Reis's expedition
Date	1552–1554
Location	Persian Gulf
Result	Portuguese victory

Belligerents
Portuguese Empire; Kingdom of Hormus	Ottoman Empire

Commanders and leaders
Dom Afonso de Noronha; Dom Diogo de Noronha	Piri Reis; Seydi Ali Reis

Strength
Unknown	4 galleons 25 galleys 850 troops

The Ottoman campaign against Hormuz took place in 1552–1554. An Ottoman fleet led by Admiral Piri Reis and Seydi Ali Reis was dispatched from the Ottoman harbour of Suez to eliminate the Portuguese presence from the northwestern part of the Indian Ocean, and especially their fortress at Hormuz Island.

== Preliminaries ==
The Ottomans were able to take possession of Basra from Persia during the Ottoman–Safavid War (1532–1555). The Ottomans were then able to capture several key positions in the Persian Gulf. In 1550, they captured Qatīf.

In the 1552–1554 expedition, the Ottoman force consisted of 4 galleons, 25 galleys, and 850 troops, dispatched from the Ottoman harbour of Suez.

== Sieges of Muscat and Hormuz ==
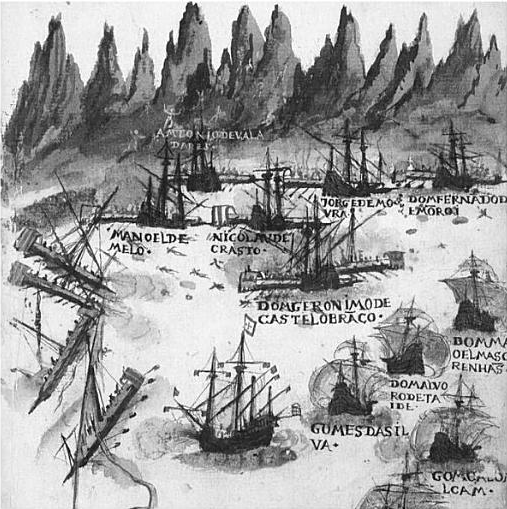
Seydi Ali Reis and his galleys taken in an ambush by Portuguese forces while trying to bring back his fleet from Basra to Suez in August 1554.

The fleet managed to sack Portuguese Muscat, modern Oman, in August 1552 in the Capture of Muscat. Soon, however, the Ottomans departed. However, they were unsuccessful in the Siege of Hormuz in September 1552.

Ultimately, the fleet managed to occupy and control the coasts of Yemen, Aden, and Arabia, as far north as Basra, so as to facilitate their trade with India. The fleet went up to Basra, then an Ottoman harbour. They were unable to capture Bahrain in 1559.

Meanwhile, during the year 1553, Seydi Ali Reis was leading an expedition against the Portuguese into the Indian Ocean, but he was unsuccessful.

Seydi Ali Reis and his galleys would be taken in an ambush (Battle of the Gulf of Oman) by Portuguese forces while he was trying to bring back his fleet from Basra to Suez in August 1554.

== See also ==
- Capture of Aden (1548)
- Siege of Hormuz (1552)
- Capture of Muscat (1552)
- Battle of the Strait of Hormuz (1553)
- Battle of the Gulf of Oman

== Sources ==
- Kunt, I.Metin; Woodhead, Christine (1995). Suleyman the Magnificent and His Age: The Ottoman Empire in the Early Modern World. Routledge. ISBN 978-0582038271.
- Mikaberidze, Alexander, ed. (2011). Conflict and Conquest in the Islamic World: A Historical Encyclopedia, Volume 1. ABC-CLIO. ISBN 978-1-59884-336-1.
