= Siege of Qatif (1551) =

16th c. military conflict

Siege of Qatif 1551
- Part of Ottoman–Portuguese conflicts (1538–1559)
Date	July 1551
Location	Qatif
Result	Portuguese victory

Belligerents
Portuguese Empire; Kingdom of Hormuz	Ottoman Empire

Commanders and leaders
Dom António de Noronha; Rax Xarafo; Mirmaxet	Unknown

Strength
1,200 Portuguese soldiers 3,000 Hormuzi auxiliaries 7 galleons 12 oar ships	400 men

Casualties and losses
Light	Light

The siege of Qatif was a military confrontation between the Portuguese Empire and the Ottoman Empire at Qatif in 1551. The Portuguese, together with their Hormuzi vassals successfully sieged, captured and demolished the fort captured from the Ottomans.

== Background ==
In 1550, the Ottoman governor of Basra captured Qatif after having bribed part of the garrison of its fort, and upon arriving with a fleet, the fort surrendered while its Hormuzi governor retreated to Hormuz, which was controlled by the Portuguese. When the Portuguese governor of India Afonso de Noronha received news at Goa that the Ottomans had captured Qatif and were encroaching on the Persian Gulf, he dispatched Dom António de Noronha to the Persian Gulf with 1,200 men and a fleet of 7 galleons and 12 oarships, tasked with expelling the Turks.

Upon arriving at Hormuz, its king provided Dom António with a force of 3,000 Persian and Hormuzi auxiliaries, under the command of his vizier, Rax Xarafo, and Mirmaxet, vizier of Mogostan.

== The siege ==
From Hormuz Dom António sent Manuel de Vasconcelos ahead with the oarships to scout Qatif and sever its communications with Ottoman Basra. He arrived in late July with the remainder of his fleet. The Portuguese staged a landing, and although Turkish horsemen attacked the Portuguese, they were driven back to the fortress. Before long the Portuguese had dug trenches, set artillery batteries and began battering the forts walls. Seeing no way to resist, at the end of eight days the garrison fled under the darkness of the night, the last being detected by the Portuguese and killed. The fort was then demolished.

== See also ==
- Kingdom of Ormus
- Ottoman-Portuguese conflicts (1538-1559)
