= Battle of the Gulf of Oman =

1554 naval battle

Coordinates: 25°N 58°E

- Part of the Ottoman–Portuguese conflicts (1538–1559)
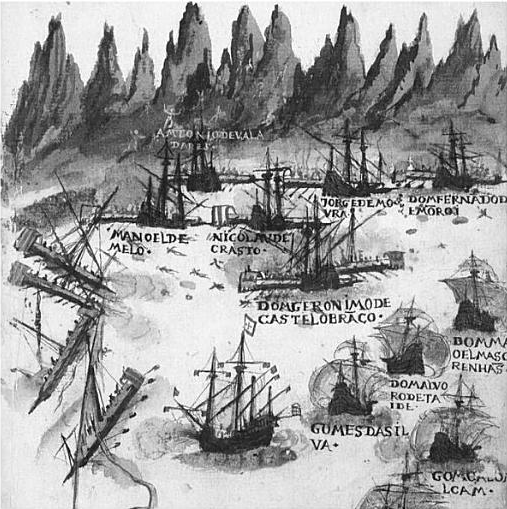
- The Portuguese attack on the Turkish fleet, in Livro de Lisuarte de Abreu
| Date | 10–25 August 1554 |
| Location | Gulf of Oman |
| Result | Portuguese victory |

Belligerents
| (Kingdom of Portugal) Portuguese Empire | Ottoman Empire |

Commanders and leaders
| (Kingdom of Portugal) Dom Fernando de Meneses (Kingdom of Portugal) Dom Antão de Noronha | Seydi Ali Reis |

Strength
| 6 galleons 6 caravels 25 fustas 1,200 men | 15 galleys 1,000 men |

Casualties and losses
| Few | All galleys captured or destroyed |

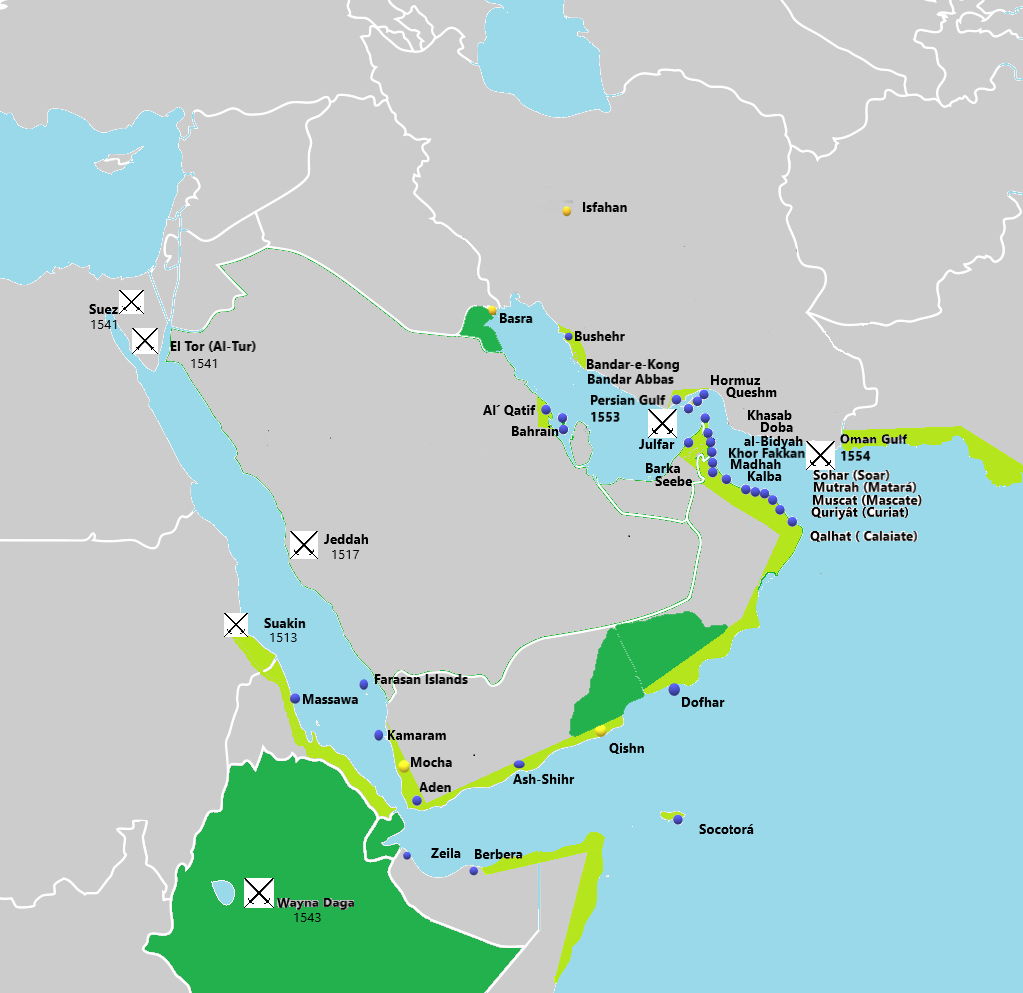
Portuguese in the Persian Gulf and Red Sea. Light Green - Possessions and main cities . Dark Green -Protectorate or under influence. Yellow - Main Factories.

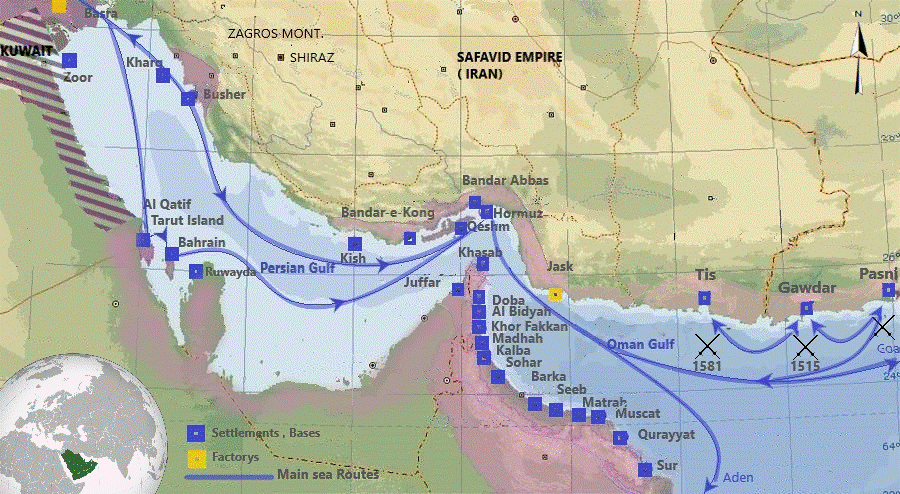
Purple - Portuguese in Persian Gulf in the 16th and 17th century. Main cities, ports and routes.

The Battle of the Gulf of Oman was a naval battle between a large Portuguese armada under Dom Fernando de Meneses and the Ottoman Indian fleet under Seydi Ali Reis. The campaign was a catastrophic failure for the Ottomans who lost all of their ships. Seydi Ali Reis later wrote that the engagement was "worse than any he had lived through under Barbarossa".

== Background ==
Since the Siege of Diu in 1538, the Ottoman Empire was attempting to counter Portuguese influence in the Indian Ocean. In 1552, Ottoman admiral Piri Reis led a number of expeditions around the Arabian Peninsula against the Portuguese with limited success. He was replaced with Murat Reis, who also led an unsuccessful campaign against the Portuguese the following year.

In late 1553, Sultan Suleiman the Magnificent nominated Seydi Ali as admiral (reis) of Ottoman naval forces stationed in Basra, in replacement of Murat Reis. He was ordered to link up his galleys with those in Suez to better fight the Portuguese, but such a task meant sailing through Portuguese controlled waters in the Persian Gulf.

In February 1554, the Portuguese dispatched from Goa six galleons, six caravels, 25 foists, and 1,200 Portuguese soldiers under the command of Dom Fernando de Meneses, son of the Viceroy, tasked to blockade the mouth of the Red Sea and collect information on any Ottoman movements. Throughout the month of March the Portuguese sighted not a single merchant ship crossing the Bab-el-Mandeb, presumably because the presence of the Portuguese fleet had discouraged any voyages that season. In April the expedition sailed to Muscat, where part of the fleet was left to spend the monsoon season while Dom Fernando took the oarships, a galleon, and several merchantships to Hormuz, to replace Dom Antão de Noronha with Bernardim de Sousa as the captain of that fortress. When the westerly winds started blowing in July, the galleon was sent back and Dom Fernando sent 3 small craft (catures) of native fishermen to scout the Shatt al-Arab for any Turkish galleys. The fishermen informed the Portuguese that Moradobec (Murat Reis) had been replaced by Alecheluby (Seydi Ali), and was about to set sail to Suez with 15 galleys.

== Battle ==
In the beginning of August the Turks set sail from Basra. The Portuguese forces in Muscat were immediately alerted of the Turks' movement and set sail to the Cape Musandam to meet them. The Portuguese oar ships sailed in the front, followed by the caravels and then the heavy galleons. The Ottomans were sighted crossing the cape on August 10, sailing against the wind in a column formation.

=== Turkish ruse ===
Steadfast, Ottoman admiral Seydi Ali ordered his fleet to maintain formation, sailing against the wind towards the Portuguese. As they closed in, the bombards of the forward Portuguese foists and the galleon Santa Cruz began exchanging shots with the leading Turkish galleys. At the last moment, Seydi Ali Reis ordered all of his galleys to turn to starboard towards land at the same time, thus avoiding the Portuguese ships, which were then unable to give chase because of the wind. The Ottomans successfully dodged a disfavourable encounter with the Portuguese and were now on their way towards Muscat.

=== Portuguese maneuver ===
Taken by surprise, the Portuguese captains gathered aboard the flagship São Mateus to discuss how to catch up with the Turkish galleys. A suggestion was taken from an experienced Portuguese pilot, who claimed that winds blew eastwards by the Persian coast, and would allow them to speedily bounce back to the Omani coast ahead of the Turks. The Portuguese fleet sailed north, then east, and after a few days arrived back in Muscat where they got the news that the Turks had not yet sailed by.

In the meantime, believing to have definitely left the Portuguese behind, the Turks advanced slowly against the wind, in order to give rest to the rowers, but always followed by Portuguese light oar craft from afar.

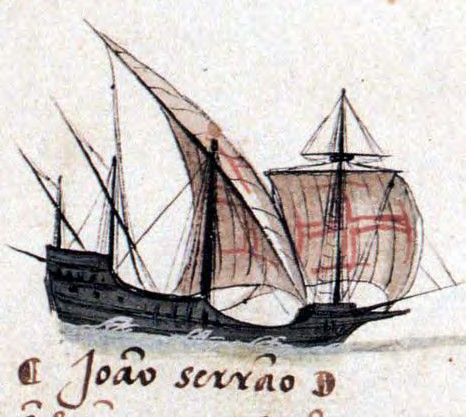
Portuguese square-rigged caravel, heavier and more suitable for naval combat.

The Portuguese waited for two or three days in Muscat, before setting out to meet the Turkish fleet by the nearby Cape Suadi. On the morning of August 25, the Turks once more sighted the same armada that Seydi Ali Reis thought to have eluded several days prior.

=== Battle ===
The Portuguese had now a more favourable westward wind, but because the Turks sailed so close to shore with their sails down, the Portuguese only sighted them at relatively short distance. As a result, they were unable to maneuver in time to prevent a few Ottoman galleys from sailing past them.

The Portuguese flagship São Mateus was then the ship closest to shore and it seemed to be the best positioned to intercept the Turkish galleys. Unable to reach the galleys, however, it dropped anchor and immediately sounded its guns at the enemy fleet. Nine galleys slipped by under Portuguese fire, but the tenth was hit by a large cannonball. Several men were killed and it veered abruptly, blocking the path of the following galleys that were then caught up and immobilized. The Portuguese caravels, the most agile ships of the fleet, promptly maneuvered at full sail to engage the galleys in a boarding battle. The caravel of Dom Jerónimo de Castelo Branco was the first to vigorously ram and grapple two galleys, hurling a large number of clay fire bombs before boarding them. Thrown into disarray, many Turkish sailors and soldiers jumped to sea, where they were cut down by the shallow draught Portuguese foists. Several more caravels arrived to attack the rest of the galleys, that surrendered after a half an hour struggle.

Seydi Ali Reis in the meantime, decided to head east across the Arabian Sea to Gujarat with his remaining galleys, hoping to evade the Portuguese as quickly as possible. Dom Fernando de Meneses ordered Dom Jerónimo and the caravels to chase after them.

== Aftermath ==
Besides the galleys themselves, the Portuguese captured 47 bronze cannon, that they took to Muscat where they were met with celebrations.

Seydi Ali Reis would eventually reach Gujarat, and was forced into the harbour of Surat by the caravels of Dom Jerónimo, where he was welcomed by the Gujarati governor. When the Portuguese Viceroy knew in Goa of their presence in India, he dispatched two galleons and 30 oarships on October 10 to the city, to pressure the governor to hand over the Turks. The governor did not surrender them but proposed to destroy their ships, to which the Portuguese agreed. Seydi Ali Reis would later endure a journey of over 2 years before finally making it back to Constantinople overland, having written about the lands he passed by during the voyage. According to his writings, Seydi Ali never realized that the fleet that he encountered on August 10 and 25 was the very same.

== Sources ==
- Monteiro, Saturnino (2010). Batalhas e Combates da Marinha Portuguesa: 1539-1579. Lisbon: Livraria Sá da Costa Editora. ISBN 978-972-562-296-4.
