= Mirat ul Memalik =

Travel notes of Ottoman Admiral Seydi Ali Reis

Mirat ul Memalik (The Mirror of Countries) is a historical book written in 1557 by Ottoman admiral Seydi Ali Reis about his travels in South Asia, Central Asia, and the Middle East. This book, which is now considered one of the earliest travel books of Turkish literature, was written in the Ottoman Turkish and Chagatai language (seyahatname) both of which are now extinct Turkic languages.

== Background ==
Seydi Ali Reis was an Ottoman admiral sent by Sultan Suleiman the Magnificent to counter the Portuguese piracy and attacks on Muslim pilgrim ships in the Indian Ocean, Arabian Sea, Red Sea, and Persian Gulf.

But after two marine battles against the Portuguese fleet and a great storm named the elephant typhoon (tufan’ı fil) by the locals, his remaining six galleys drifted to India. The fleet was unserviceable, resulting in his return home overland with 50 men.

== The book ==
Seydi Ali Reis then arrived at the royal court of the Mughal Emperor Humayun in Delhi, where he met the future Mughal emperor Akbar, who was 12 years old at the time.

He returned to the Ottoman Empire over Muslim states in South Asia; Afghanistan, Central Asia, and Iran. But he delayed his return because of the war between the Ottoman Empire and the Safavid Empire in Iran. Finally, following the treaty of Amasya in 1555, he was able to return home and present his book Mirat ul Memalik about his journey to the sultan in 1557. This book is now considered one of the earliest travel books in Ottoman literature.
