= Ottoman–Portuguese conflicts (1538–1560) =

Series of military encounters between the Portuguese and Ottoman Empires

- Part of the Ottoman–Portuguese confrontations
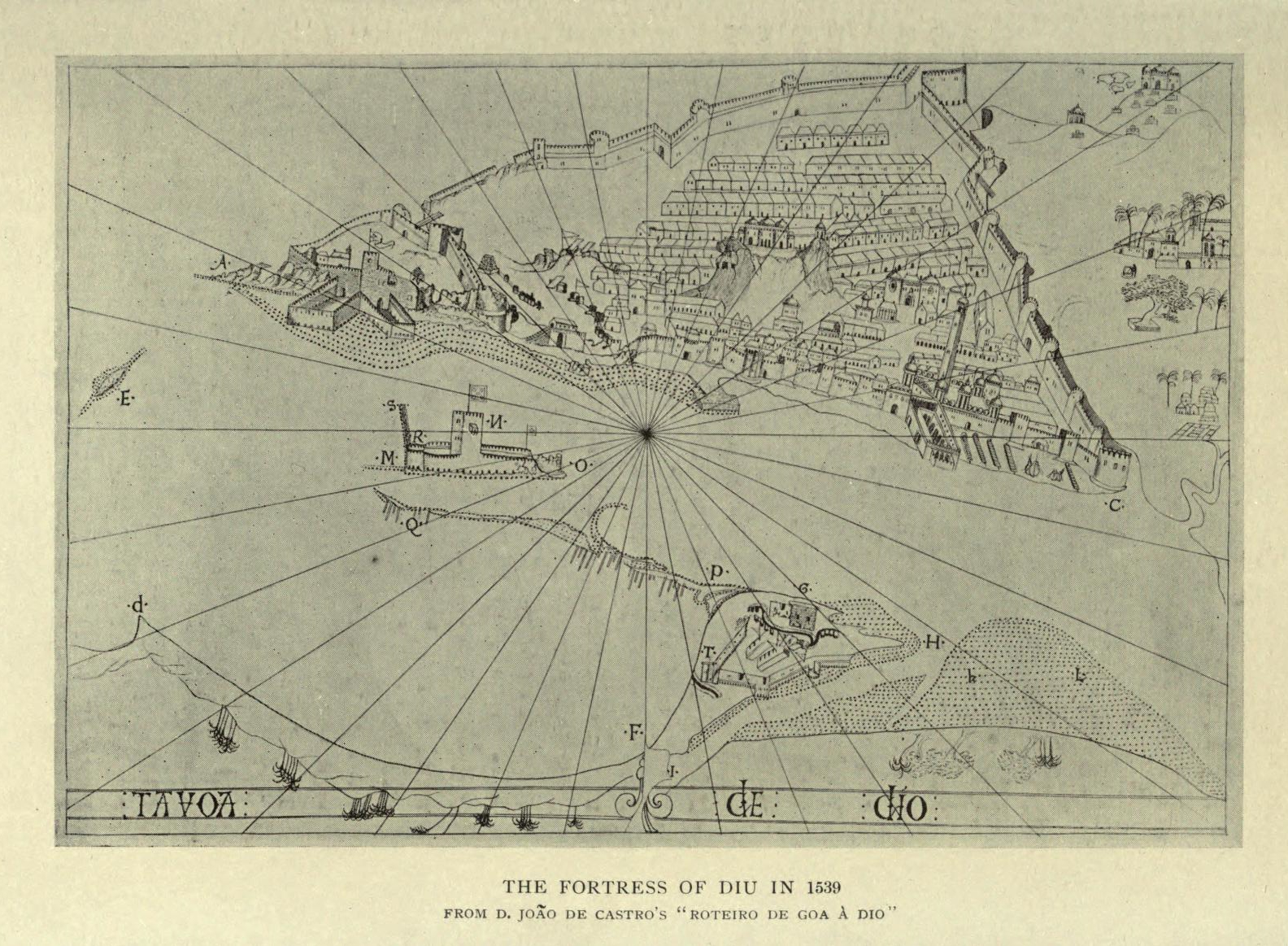
- The Portuguese fortress of Diu in India, strongly attacked by the Ottomans in 1538.
Date	1538–1560 (22 years)
Location	The Persian Gulf, Horn of Africa, Red Sea and India
Result	Status quo ante bellum; Portugal maintains control of the Persian Gulf and the Indian Ocean; Ottomans expand their influence in the Red Sea

Belligerents
Portuguese Empire; Kingdom of Hormuz; Supported by: Ethiopian Empire; Kathiri Sultanate	Ottoman Empire; Supported by: Adal Sultanate; Gujarat Sultanate; Baloch Tribe

Commanders and leaders
Estêvão da Gama; Cristóvão da Gama (executed); António da Silveira; Diogo de Noronha; António de Noronha; João de Castro; Álvaro de Castro; Fernando de Meneses; (Ethiopian Empire) Dawit II of Ethiopia; (Ethiopian Empire) Gelawdewos of Ethiopia	(Ottoman Empire) Suleiman Pasha; (Ottoman Empire) Piri Reis; (Ottoman Empire) Seydi Ali Reis; (Ottoman Empire) Sefer Reis; (Ottoman Empire) Murat Reis; (Ottoman Empire) Mustafa Pasha †; (Ottoman Empire) Khadjar Safar †; Ahmad al-Ghazi †; Barakat ibn Umar Din †; Nur ibn Mujahid; Jalal Aldin

The Ottoman–Portuguese conflicts (Portuguese: Guerra Turco-Portuguesa, Turkish: Osmanlı İmparatorluğu-Portekiz İmparatorluğu çekişmesi, 1538–60) also known as the Ottoman–Portuguese War, were a period of conflict during the Ottoman–Portuguese confrontations and series of armed military encounters between the Portuguese Empire and the Ottoman Empire along with regional allies in and along the Indian Ocean, Persian Gulf, and Red Sea.

== Background ==
After the voyages of Vasco da Gama, a powerful Portuguese Navy took control of the Indian Ocean in the early 16th century. It threatened the coastal cities of the Arabian Peninsula and the Indian subcontinent. The headquarters of the Portuguese was Goa, a city on the west coast of India, captured in 1510.

Ottoman control of the Red Sea meanwhile began in 1517 when Selim I annexed Egypt to the Ottoman Empire after the Battle of Ridaniya. Most of the habitable zone of the Arabian Peninsula (Hejaz and Tihamah) soon fell voluntarily to the Ottomans. Piri Reis, who was famous for his World Map, presented it to Selim just a few weeks after the sultan arrived in Egypt. Part of the 1513 map, which covers the Atlantic Ocean and the Americas, is now in the Topkapı Museum. The portion concerning the Indian Ocean is missing; it is argued that Selim may have taken it, so that he could make more use of it in planning future military expeditions in that direction. In fact, after the Ottoman domination in the Red Sea, the Turco-Portuguese rivalry began. Selim entered into negotiations with Muzaffar Shah II of Gujarat, (a sultanate in northwest India), about a possible joint strike against the Portuguese in Goa. However Selim died in 1520.

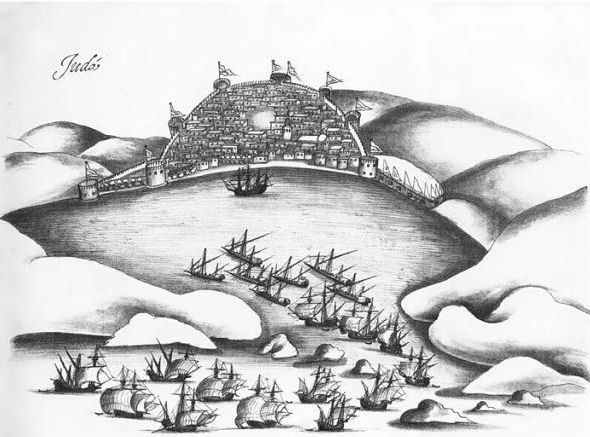
The Ottoman admiral Selman Reis defended Jeddah against a Portuguese attack in 1517

In 1525, during the reign of Suleiman I (Selim's son), Selman Reis, a former corsair, was appointed as the admiral of a small Ottoman fleet in the Red Sea which was tasked with defending Ottoman coastal towns against Portuguese attacks. In 1534, Suleiman annexed most of Iraq and by 1538 the Ottomans had reached Basra on the Persian Gulf. The Ottoman Empire still faced the problem of Portuguese controlled coasts. Most coastal towns on the Arabian Peninsula were either Portuguese ports or Portuguese vassals. Another reason for Turco-Portugal rivalry was economic. In the 15th century, the main trade routes from the Far East to Europe, the so-called spice route, was via the Red Sea and Egypt. But after Africa was circumnavigated the trade income was decreasing. While the Ottoman Empire was a major sea power in the Mediterranean, it was not possible to transfer the Ottoman Navy to the Red Sea. So, a new fleet was built in Suez and named the "Indian fleet". The apparent reason of the expeditions in the Indian Ocean, nonetheless, was an invitation from India.

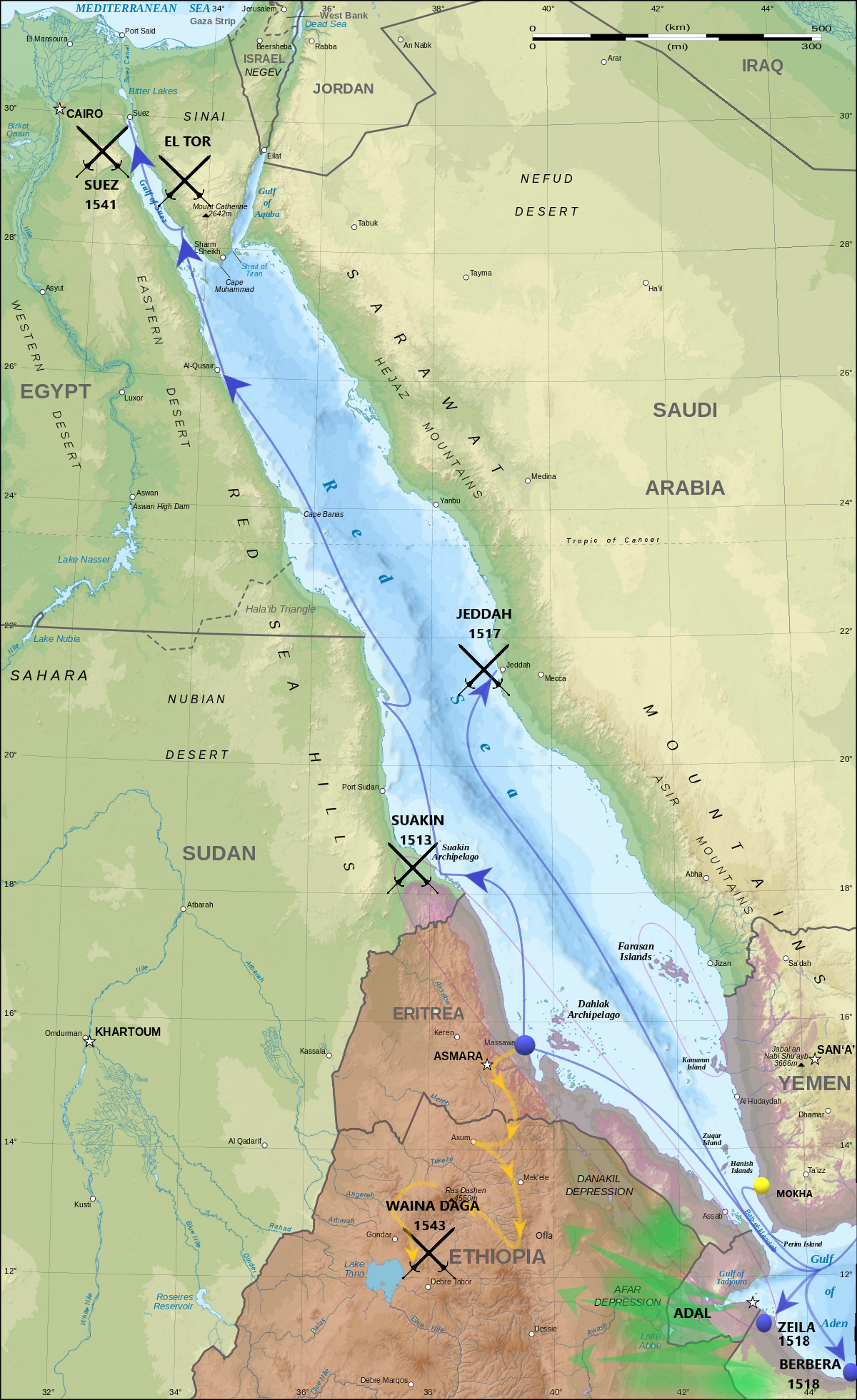
Portuguese presence in the Red Sea

This war took place upon the backdrop of the Ethiopian–Adal War. Ethiopia had been invaded in 1529 by the Adal Sultanate with Ottoman backing. Portuguese help, which was first requested by Emperor Dawit II in 1520, finally arrived in Massawa during the reign of Emperor Galawdewos. The force was led by Cristóvão da Gama (second son of Vasco da Gama) and included 400 musketeers, several breech-loading field guns, and a few Portuguese cavalrymen as well as a number of artisans and other non-combatants.

== Course of hostilities ==
=== Siege of Diu, 1538 ===
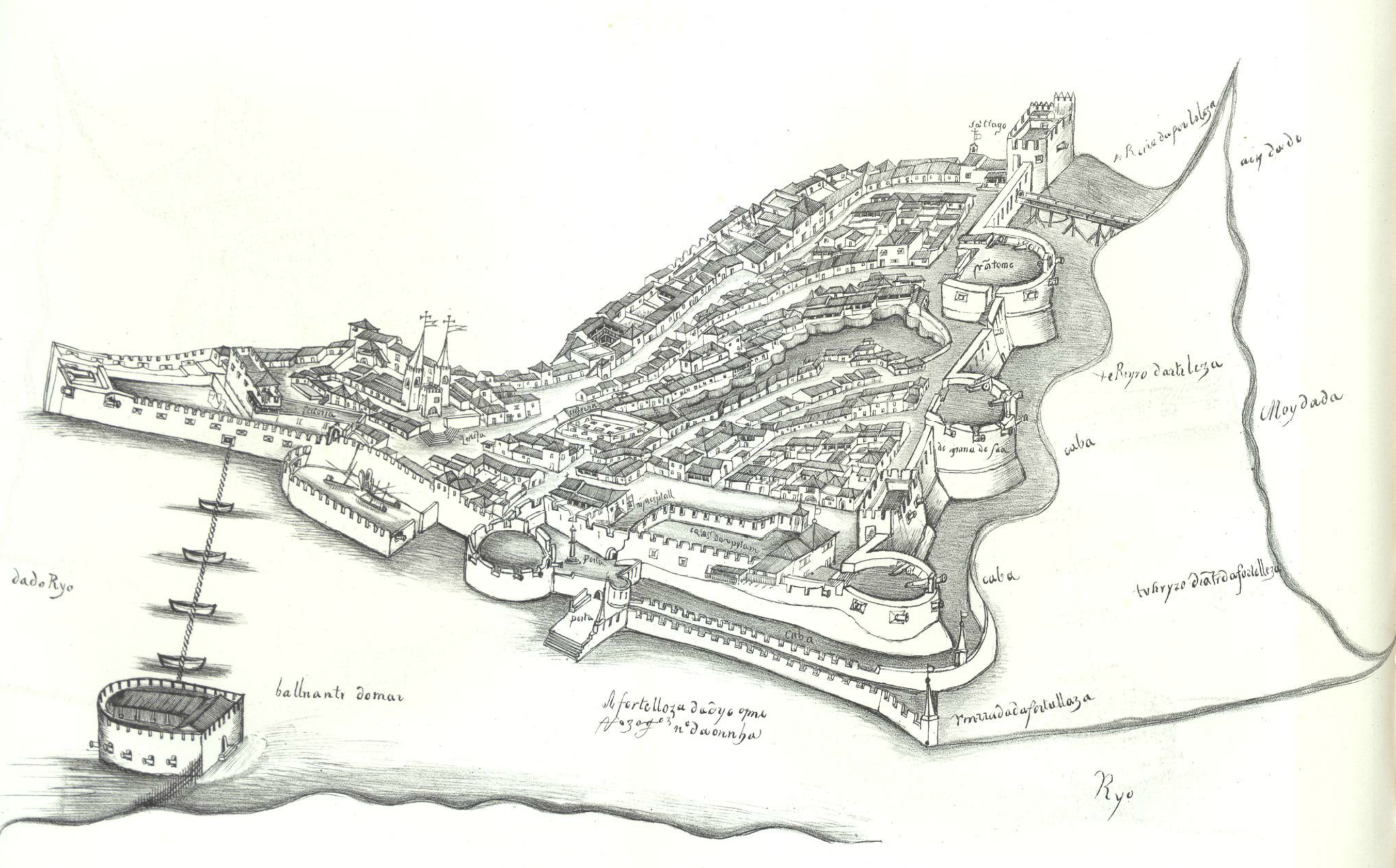
The Portuguese fortress of Diu in Gujarat, India.

Major hostilities between Portugal and the Ottoman Empire began in 1538, when the Ottomans assisted the Sultanate of Gujarat with about 80 vessels to lay siege to Diu, which had been built by the Portuguese in 1535. The Ottoman fleet was led by Suleiman I's governor of Egypt Suleiman Pasha, but the attack was not successful, and the siege was lifted.

Bahadur Shah, the son of Muzaffer II, the ruler of Gujarat who had negotiated with Selim, appealed to Constantinople for joint action against the Portuguese navy. Suleiman I used this opportunity to check Portuguese domination in the Indian Ocean and appointed Hadim Suleiman Pasha as the admiral of his Indian Ocean fleet. Hadim Suleiman Pasha's naval force consisted of some 90 galleys. In 1538, he sailed to India via the Red and Arabian Seas, only to learn that Bahadur Shah had been killed during a clash with the Portuguese navy and his successor had allied himself with Portugal. After an unsuccessful siege at Diu, he decided to return. On his way back to Suez, however, he conquered most of Yemen, including Aden. After the expedition, Hadim Suleiman was promoted to grand vizier.

=== Suez campaign, 1541 ===
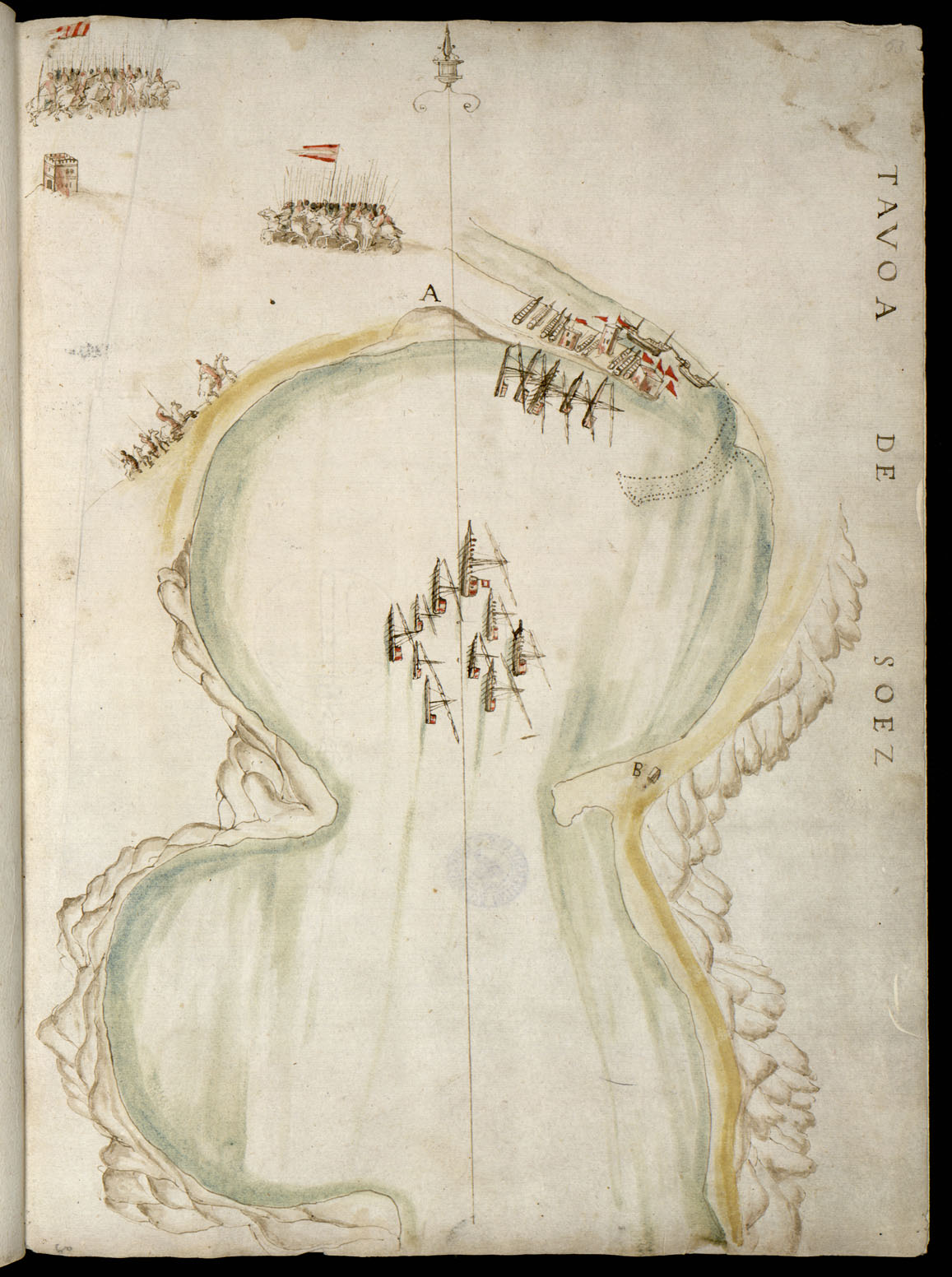
Portuguese depiction of Suez in 1541.

The Portuguese under Estêvão da Gama (first son of Vasco da Gama) organized an expedition to destroy the Ottoman fleet at Suez, leaving Goa on 31 December 1540 and reaching Aden by 27 January 1541. The fleet reached Massawa on 12 February, where Gama left a number of ships and continued north. The Portuguese then destroyed the Ottoman ports of Suakin and Qoseir, they attacked Jeddah but were repulsed. Reaching Suez, he discovered that the Ottomans had long known of his raid, and foiled his attempt to burn the beached ships. Gama was forced to retrace his steps to Massawa, although pausing to attack the port of El-Tor (Sinai Peninsula).

=== Ethiopian campaign, 1541–1543 ===
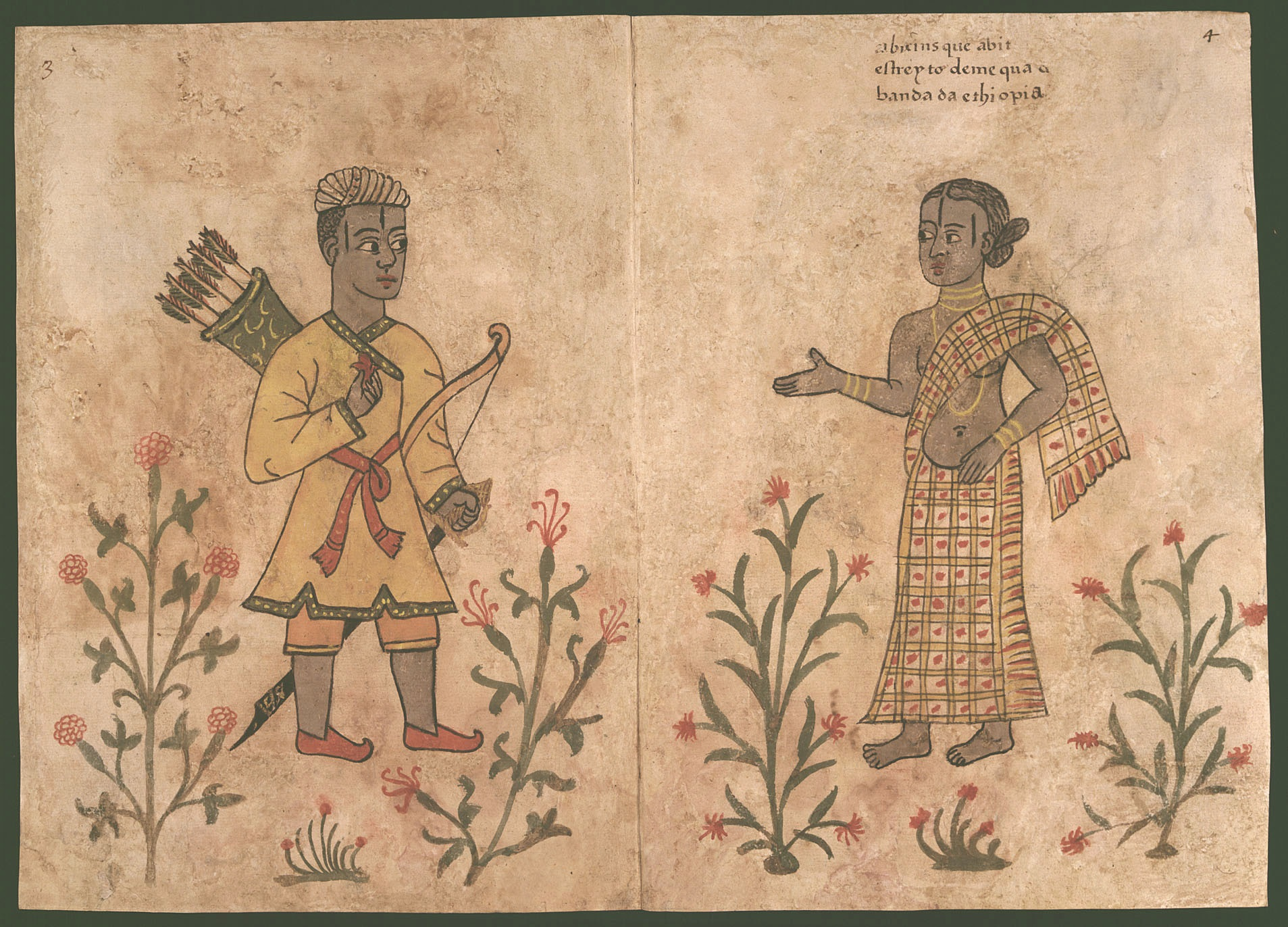
16th century Portuguese depiction of Ethiopians, from the Códice Casanatense.

At Massawa, governor Estevão da Gama responded to an appeal to assist the Christian Ethiopian Empire against invading Adalite forces. An expeditionary corps of 400 men were left behind, commanded by the governor's brother, Cristóvão da Gama. In February 1542, the Portuguese were able to capture an important Adalite stronghold at the Battle of Baçente. The Portuguese were again victorious at the Battle of Jarte, killing almost all of the Turkish contingent. However, imam then requested aid from the Ottoman governor of Yemen in Aden, who sent 2,000 Arabian musketeers, 900 Turkish pikemen, 1,000 Turkish foot musketeers, some Shqiptar foot soldiers (with muskets) and Turkish horsemen. In the Battle of Wofla, Somali and Turkish forces defeated the Portuguese.

Gelawdewos was eventually able to reorganize his forces and absorb the remaining Portuguese soldiers, defeating and slaying Ahmed at the Battle of Wayna Daga, marking the end of the Ethiopian-Adal war (although warfare would resume not long after, at a much-diminished scale).

=== Battle of the Mergui Archipelago, 1544 ===
In early 1544, approximately 100 Portuguese freebooters under Lançarote Guerreiro sailed from Malacca in four fustas to raid shipping near Tenasserim, one of Siam's principal ports. King Chairachathirat of Ayutthaya assigned an Ottoman mercenary captain, Heredin Mafamede, to eliminate the threat. Heredin had commanded an Ottoman galley during Süleyman Pasha's 1538 Diu campaign but, having become separated from the fleet while crossing the Indian Ocean, proceeded to Tenasserim and entered Siamese service. His fleet comprised one galley, probably the vessel he had sailed from the Red Sea, four galliots and five fustas, manned by 800 fighting men, including 300 janissaries. (Note: According to another source, the fleet consisted of 15 ships.)

The battle took place on 28–29 September 1544. Heredin caught Guerreiro careening his ships in the Mergui Islands. When the Portuguese fled, Heredin dispersed his fleet in pursuit, leaving his flagship isolated. In the dead of night, Guerreiro launched a desperate surprise assault on the galley, capturing it and slaughtering its entire complement, including Heredin. Two Ottoman fustas approaching after daybreak to report were seized by the Portuguese. When two more approached, they suffered the same fate. A storm then sank two Ottoman galliots and the remaining fusta, while the two surviving galliots were subsequently hunted down and captured by the Portuguese.

=== Siege of Diu, 1546 ===
In 1546, the Gujarati governor of Surat, Khoja Zufar wanted to recapture Diu from the Portuguese. A fleet dispatched by Suleiman consisting of 30 ships and Ottoman soldiers arrived in Diu to help the Gujarati forces besiege the city. After around 7 months of fighting, Portuguese reinforcements from Goa arrived under the command of João de Castro and the Muslim forces were routed. Khoja Zufar would die in battle.

=== Aden revolt, 1548 ===
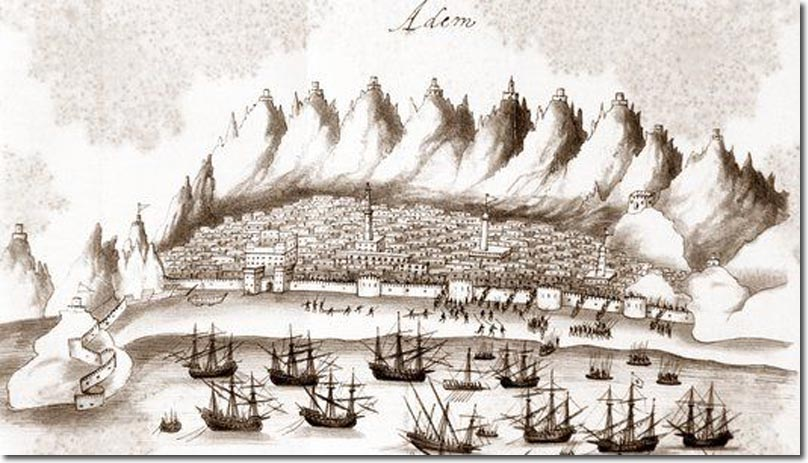
1513 Portuguese depiction of Aden.

The aim of the second expedition was to restore Ottoman authority in the Red Sea and Yemen. The new admiral was Piri Reis, who had earlier presented his world map to Selim. He recaptured Aden which in 1548 had revolted against Ottoman authority, thus securing the Red Sea.

=== Siege of Qatif, 1551 ===
In 1551, the Ottoman governor of Basra captured the fort of Qatif on the Arabian Peninsula, owned by a vassal of the Portuguese, the King of Hormuz. The Portuguese, together with their Hormuzi vassals successfully sieged and captured the fort from the Ottomans, whose garrison fled under the cover of the night. The fort was then razed afterward.

=== Piri Reis expedition, 1552 ===
Route of Piri Reis in 1552.

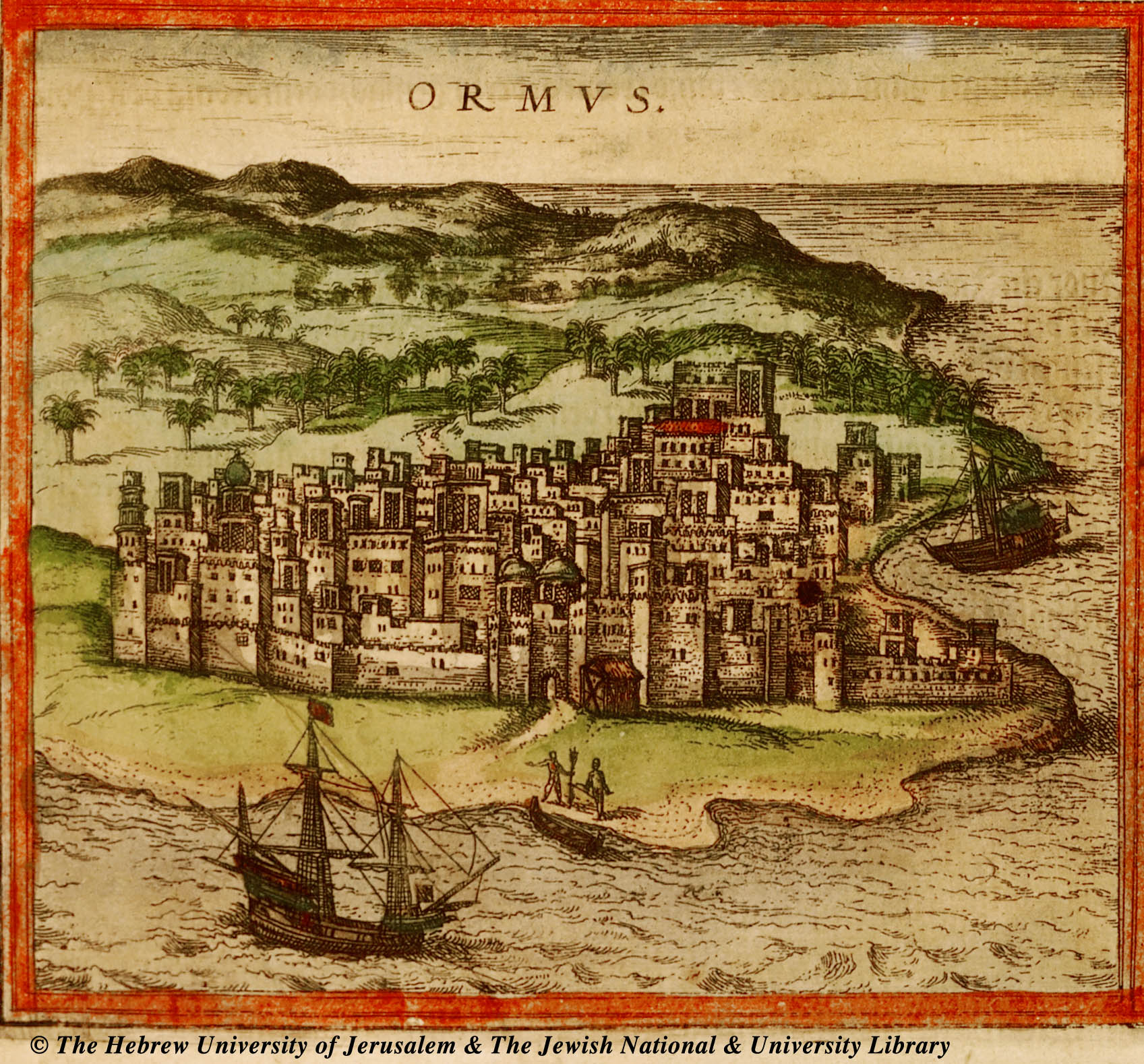
Portuguese ships in Hormuz

Three years later Piri Reis sailed out from Suez again with 30 ships and the goal of wresting Hormuz Island, the key to the Persian Gulf, from Portugal. Piri Reis sacked Muscat on his way. Turning further east, Piri Reis failed to capture Hormuz, at the entrance of the Persian Gulf. He sacked the town, but the Portuguese fortress remained intact. Faced with reports of an approaching Portuguese fleet, Piri Reis decided to withdraw the fleet to Basra. He returned to Suez with two galleys which were his personal property. The sultan sentenced Piri Reis to death for these acts and had him executed in 1553.

Following these events, the Portuguese dispatched considerable reinforcements to Hormuz, and the following year defeated an Ottoman fleet at the Battle of the Strait of Hormuz.

=== Murat Reis the Elder Expedition and Battle of the Strait of Hormuz, 1553 ===
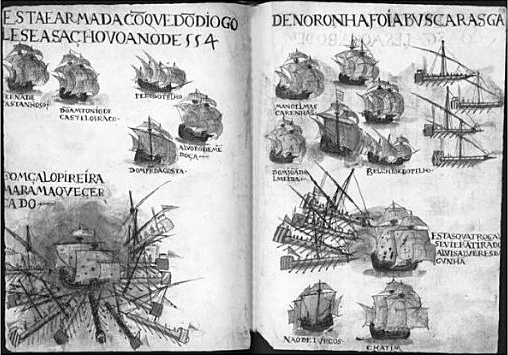
Battle of the Strait of Hormuz, depicted in the Book of Lisuarte de Abreu.

In 1553, the Portuguese soundly defeated an Ottoman fleet led by Murat Reis the Elder in the Battle of the Strait of Hormuz. The purpose of this expedition was to bring the fleet back to Suez. The new Ottoman admiral was the former sanjak-bey (governor) of Qatif. While trying to sail out of the Persian Gulf, he encountered a large Portuguese fleet commanded by Dom Diogo de Noronha. In the largest open-sea engagement between the two countries, Murat was defeated by the Portuguese fleet and had to return to Basra.

=== Seydi Ali Reis Expedition and Battle of the Gulf of Oman, 1554 ===
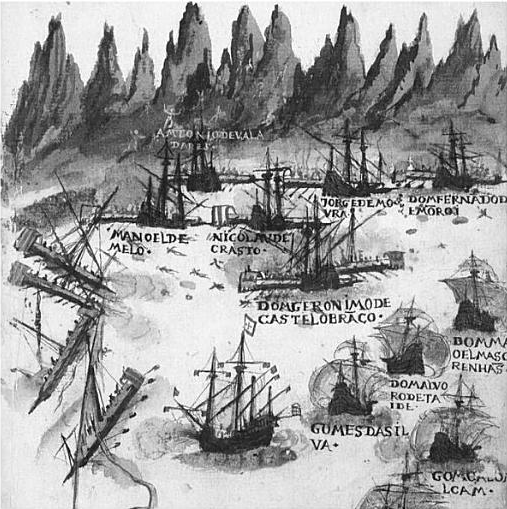
The Portuguese rout the Turkish fleet, in Livro de Lisuarte de Abreu

Seydi Ali Reis was appointed as the admiral after the failure of the third expedition, in 1553. But what he found in Basra was a group of neglected galleys. Nevertheless, after some maintenance, he decided to sail. He passed through the Strait of Hormuz and began sailing along Omani shores where he fought the Portuguese fleet twice. After the second battle, Seydi Ali Reis fled, eventually reaching Gujarat and was forced into the harbor of Surat by the caravels of Dom Jerónimo, where the Gujarati governor welcomed him. When the Portuguese Viceroy knew in Goa of their presence in India, he dispatched two galleons and 30 warships on October 10 to the city, to pressure the governor to hand over the Turks. The governor did not surrender them but proposed to destroy their ships, to which the Portuguese agreed. The remainder of the fleet was unserviceable, resulting in his return home overland with 50 men. Seydi Ali Reis then arrived at the royal court of the Mughal Emperor Humayun in Delhi where he met the future Mughal emperor Akbar who was then 12 years old.

The route from India to Turkey was a very dangerous one because of the war between the Ottoman Empire and Persia. Seydi Ali Reis returned home after the treaty of Amasya was signed between the two countries in 1555. He wrote a book named Mirror of Countries (Mir’at ül Memalik) about this adventurous journey and presented it to Suleiman I in 1557. This book is now considered one of the earliest travel books in Ottoman literature.

=== Red Sea Campaign, 1556 ===
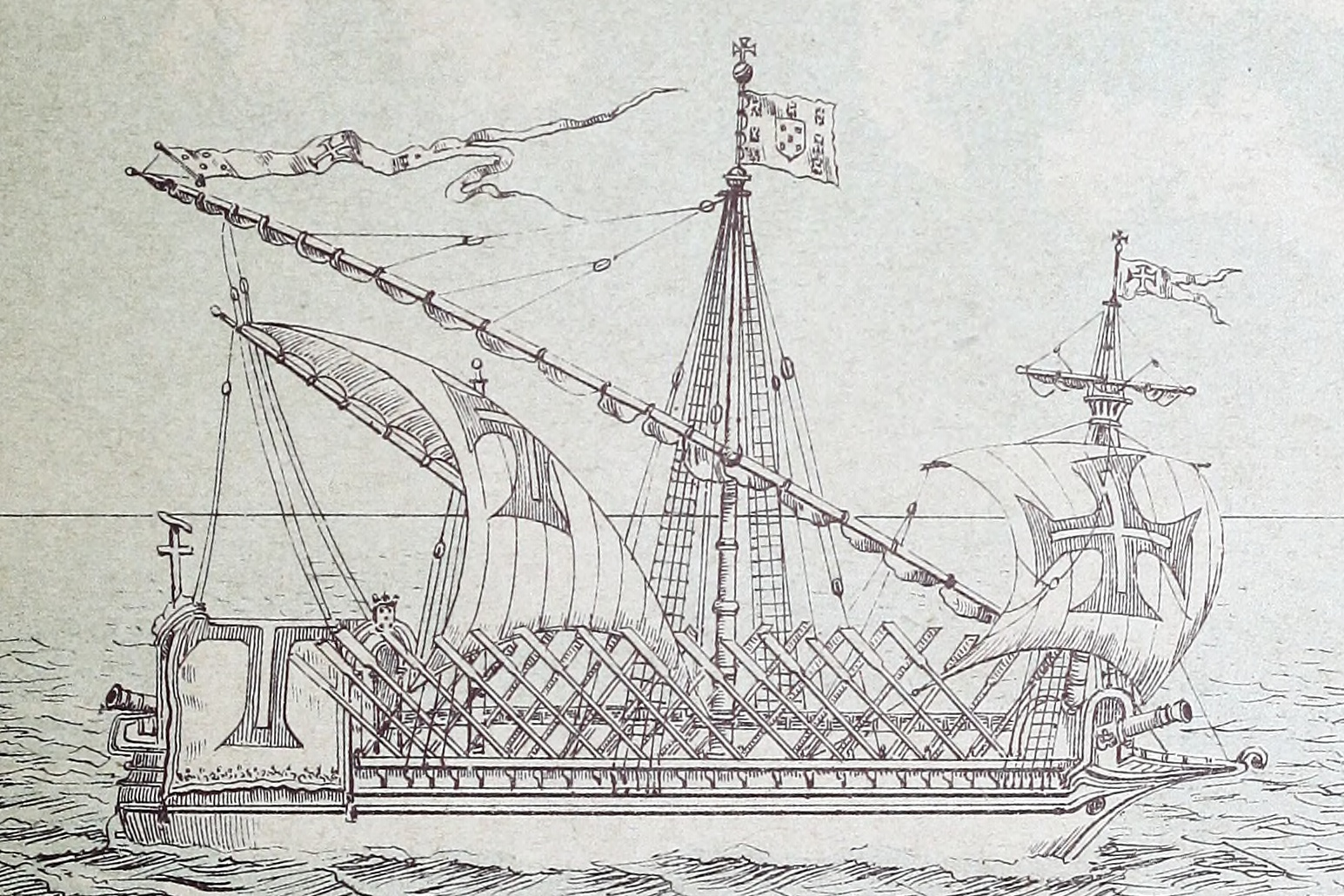
Portuguese galley.

In early 1556, two Portuguese galleys under the command of João Peixoto sailed into the Red Sea to collect information regarding Ottoman preparations at Suez. Having found everything to be quiet there, he set sail to the city of Suakin, where he arrived one night. Finding the city asleep, Peixoto landed with his men and killed many, including the ruler, and captured considerable spoil. He departed the following day, and keeping close to shore sacked a number of towns en route to Goa.

=== Siege of Bahrain, 1559 ===
In 1559 the Ottomans laid siege to Bahrain, which had been conquered by the Portuguese in 1521 and ruled indirectly since then, but the forces led by the Governor of Al-Hasa were decisively beaten back. After this, the Portuguese effectively controlled the entirety of the naval traffic in the Persian Gulf. They raided the Ottoman coastal city of Al-Katif during this time, in 1559.

=== Battle of Kamaran Island, 1560 ===
In 1560 the Turkish privateer Sefer Reis captured two Portuguese warships by Kamaran Island in the Red Sea.

== Aftermath ==
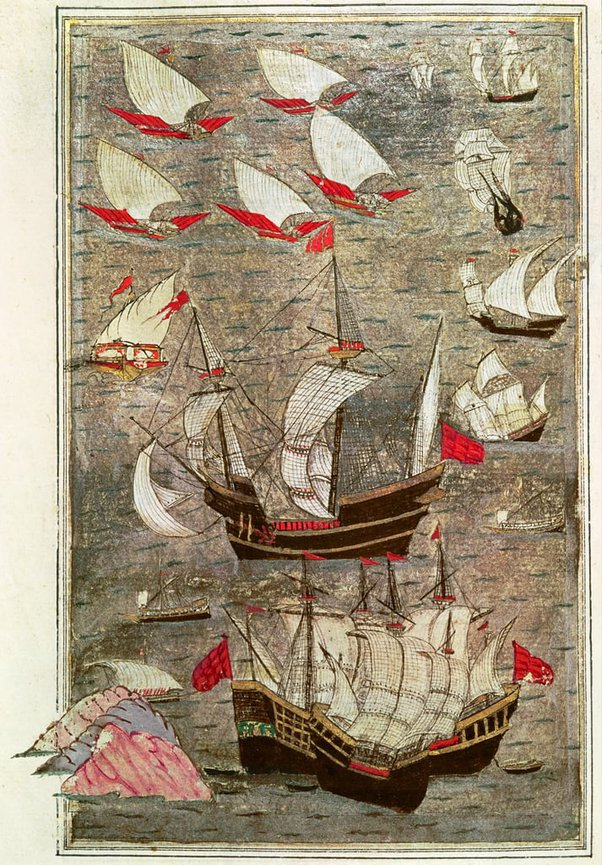
Ottoman fleet in the Indian Ocean in the 16th century.

The original Ottoman goals of checking Portuguese domination in the ocean and assisting Muslim Indian lords were not achieved. This was in spite of what an author has called "overwhelming advantages over Portugal", as the Ottoman Empire was wealthier and much more populous than Portugal, professed the same religion as most coastal populations of the Indian Ocean basin and its naval bases were closer to the theater of operations.

On the other hand, Yemen, as well as the west bank of the Red Sea, roughly corresponding to a narrow coastal strip of Sudan and Eritrea, were annexed by Özdemir Pasha, the deputy of Hadım Suleiman Pasha. Three more provinces in East Africa were established: Massawa, Habesh (Abyssia) and Sawakin (Suakin). The ports around the Arabian Peninsula were also secured.

Portuguese naval banner bearing a Cross of the Order of Christ, commonly used in the 16th century.

With its strong control of the Red Sea, the Ottomans successfully managed to dispute control of the trade routes to the Portuguese and maintained a significant level of trade with the Mughal Empire throughout the 16th century.

Sometimes, Ottoman assistance to Aceh (in Sumatra, Indonesia), in 1569 is also considered to be a part of these expeditions (see Kurtoğlu Hızır Reis). However, that expedition was not a military expedition.

It is known that Sokollu Mehmed Pasha, the grand vizier of the empire between 1565 and 1579, had proposed a canal between the Mediterranean and Red Seas. If that project could have been realized, it would be possible for the navy to pass through the canal and eventually into the Indian Ocean. However, this project was beyond the technological capabilities of the 16th century. The Suez Canal was not opened until some three centuries later, in 1869, by the largely autonomous Khedivate of Egypt.

Unable to decisively defeat the Portuguese or threaten their shipping, the Ottomans abstained from further substantial action, choosing instead to supply Portuguese enemies such as the Aceh Sultanate, and things returned to the status quo ante bellum. The Portuguese for their part enforced their commercial and diplomatic ties with Safavid Persia, an enemy of the Ottoman Empire. A tense truce was gradually formed, wherein the Ottomans were allowed to control the overland routes into Europe, thereby keeping Basra, which the Portuguese had been eager to acquire, and the Portuguese were allowed to dominate sea trade to India and East Africa. The Ottomans then shifted their focus to the Red Sea, which they had been expanding into previously, with the acquisition of Egypt in 1517 and Aden in 1538.

== See also ==
- Military history of Portugal
- Siege of Malacca (1568)
- Kingdom of Ormus
- Conquest of Tunis (1535)
- Ottoman–Portuguese conflicts (1586–1589)
- Gujarati–Portuguese conflicts
- Somali–Portuguese conflicts
- Acehnese-Portuguese conflicts

== Sources ==
- Peter Malcolm Holt, Ann K. S. Lambton, Bernard Lewis The Cambridge history of Islam 1977.
- Attila and Balázs Weiszhár: Lexicon of War (Háborúk lexikona), Athenaum publisher, Budapest 2004.
- Britannica Hungarica, Hungarian encyclopedia, Hungarian World publisher, Budapest 1994.
- Shillington, Kevin (2013). Encyclopedia of African History. Routledge. ISBN 978-1-135-45670-2.
- Dumper, Michael R.T.; Stanley, Bruce E. (2007). Cities of the Middle East and North Africa: a Historical Encyclopedia. ABC-Clio. ISBN 978-1-57607-919-5.
- İnalcık, Halıl; Quataert, Donald (1994). An Economic and Social History of the Ottoman Empire, 1300–1914. Cambridge Univ. Press. ISBN 978-0-521-34315-2.
- Larsen, Curtis E. (1983). Life and Land Use on the Bahrain Islands: the Geoarcheology of an Ancient Society. University of Chicago Press. ISBN 978-0-226-46906-5.
- Nuno Vila-Santa, "Between Ottomans and Gujaratis: D. Diogo de Noronha, the Repositioning of Diu in the Indian Ocean, and the Creation of the Northern Province (1548–1560)", Asian Review of World Histories, Volume 8 (2020): Issue 2 (Jul 2020), pp. 207–233.
