= Aden Revolt =

1548 Ottoman capture of Aden

Coordinates: 12°47′52″N 45°01′27″E

Date	26 February 1548
Location	Aden, Yemen
Result	Ottoman victory
Territorial changes	Ottomans recapture Aden

Belligerents
Ottoman Empire	Aden rebels

Commanders and leaders
Piri Reis	Suleyman †; Mohammed

Strength
Unknown	Unknown

Casualties and losses
Unknown	Unknown

The Aden revolt of 1548 was a rebellion against Ottoman rule in Yemen, that was suppressed after Ottoman forces under Piri Reis arrived on 26 February 1548.

== Background ==
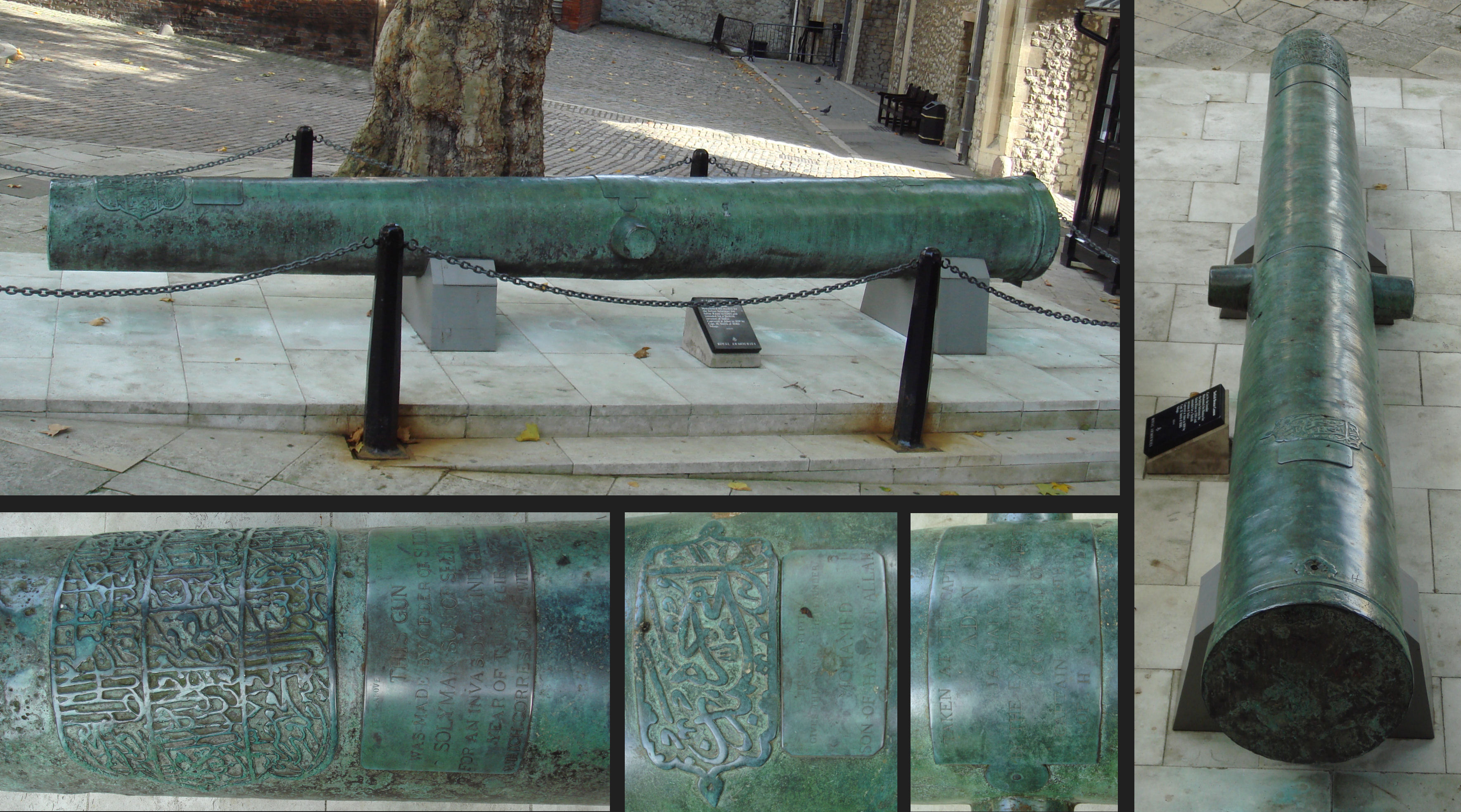
Aden cannon of Hadim Suleiman Pasha founded by Mohammed ibn Hamza in 1530–31 for an Ottoman invasion of India. Taken in the capture of Aden in 1839 by Henry Smith of HMS Volage to Tower of London.

Aden had already been captured by the Ottomans for Suleiman the Magnificent in 1538 by Hadim Suleiman Pasha, in order to provide an Ottoman base for raids against Portuguese possessions on the western coast of India. Sailing on to India, the Ottomans failed against the Portuguese at the Siege of Diu in September 1538, but then returned to Aden where they fortified the city with 100 pieces of artillery. From this base, Sulayman Pasha sought to take control of the whole country of Yemen, also taking Sanaa.

In 1547, Aden arose against the Ottomans however and invited the Portuguese instead, so that the Portuguese were in control of the city.

== The Revolt ==
The ruler of Campar Suleyman Ali bin Suleyman al-Tawlaki seized the city of Aden from the Ottomans and as they now threatened him, he sought the support of the Portuguese at Hormuz, offering to submit to the king of Portugal, John III. The Portuguese captain of Hormuz dispatched three small ships with men and supplies, commanded by Dom Payo de Noronha, who was well received by Suleyman. He surrendered the city and fortress to the Portuguese, on the understanding that they would protect him and help against the Ottomans. As Dom Payo had only a small force at his disposal, he sent one of his ships back to Hormuz to ask for reinforcements.

Ali bin Suleyman al-Tawlaki who was a local chieftain fought the Ottoman navy of 60 ships of various sizes which arrived on 15 November 1547 until he died, then he was succeeded by his son, Mohammed. Eventually, the Ottomans managed to win and the city was recaptured by Piri Reis on 26 February 1548.

== See also ==
- Siege of Aden (1513)
- Ottoman–Portuguese conflicts (1538–1560)
