= Diogo de Noronha =

Portuguese naval officer

Dom Diogo de Noronha was an important Portuguese military and a naval officer from the 16th century. He served in Portuguese Asia under viceroys Dom Afonso de Noronha (1550-1554), Dom Pedro Mascarenhas (1554-1555), governor Francisco Barreto (1555-1558) and viceroy Dom Constantino de Braganza (1558-1561). He is mostly recorded as the first Portuguese captain of Daman, India and one of the fathers of the Portuguese Northern Province.

== Early life ==
Not much is known about Dom Diogo earliest years. He was born in about 1516 and was known as "the Hearts" due to a problem in his back. He started his military career servicing in Portuguese Ceuta under captain Dom Afonso de Noronha (1538-1550), who was a relative to him, in the late 1540s. When Dom Afonso de Noronha was named viceroy of India, in 1550, by King John III of Portugal, Dom Diogo was appointed as one of the ship captains of the vice royal fleet. Due to some problems in navigation, he only reached India in May 1551.

== Early career in the Persian Gulf ==
In 1552, due to the siege of Portuguese Hormuz by the Ottoman admiral Piri Reis, Dom Diogo de Noronha was tasked with departing for the region on the fleet of Dom Antão de Noronha. Dom Antão had been appointed, by the viceroy Dom Afonso de Noronha, as the next captain of Hormuz and Dom Diogo was entrusted with the task of commanding the Portuguese fleet that attempted to blockade the way out of the Persian Gulf. At stake, was preventing that the Ottoman fleet of Basra, could unite with the Ottoman fleet of the Red Sea. Due to this fact, Dom Diogo de Noronha battled with Ottoman ships in 1553 and was successful in preventing their escape from the Persian Gulf.

== Captaincy of Diu ==
In 1554, Dom Diogo returned to India where the viceroy D. Afonso de Noronha entrusted him with the captaincy of Diu, India. King John III had already named him for it in 1551, but Dom Diogo only assumed it in 1554. He was given major powers and several men due to war in the region. The previous fear of a new joint siege to Diu by the Ottomans and the Gujaratis meant that Dom Diogo spent most of his years battling with Gujarati lords on the Diu area. He successfully managed to acquire all the income from the custom-house of Diu in 1555. Facing siege to Diu, Dom Diogo managed to manipulate the Gujarati court to achieve his goals. When governor Francisco Barreto visited Portuguese Vasai in 1556, he forced the governor to give up the concession of the custom-house revenues of Diu in exchange for Daman and he promised everyone that with 4000 soldiers he would conquer the whole Gujarati Sultanate. He also had hopes of succeeding the old viceroy Dom Pedro Mascarenhas in 1555, but was disillusioned when governor Barreto succeeded viceroy Mascarenhas in the King's orders. This fact explains some of his rivalry with governor Barreto. Still, when he ended his captaincy of Diu, in April 1557, governor Barreto asked him to stay in India for one more year since he hoped he could assist him in the conquer of Daman.

== Captaincy of Daman ==
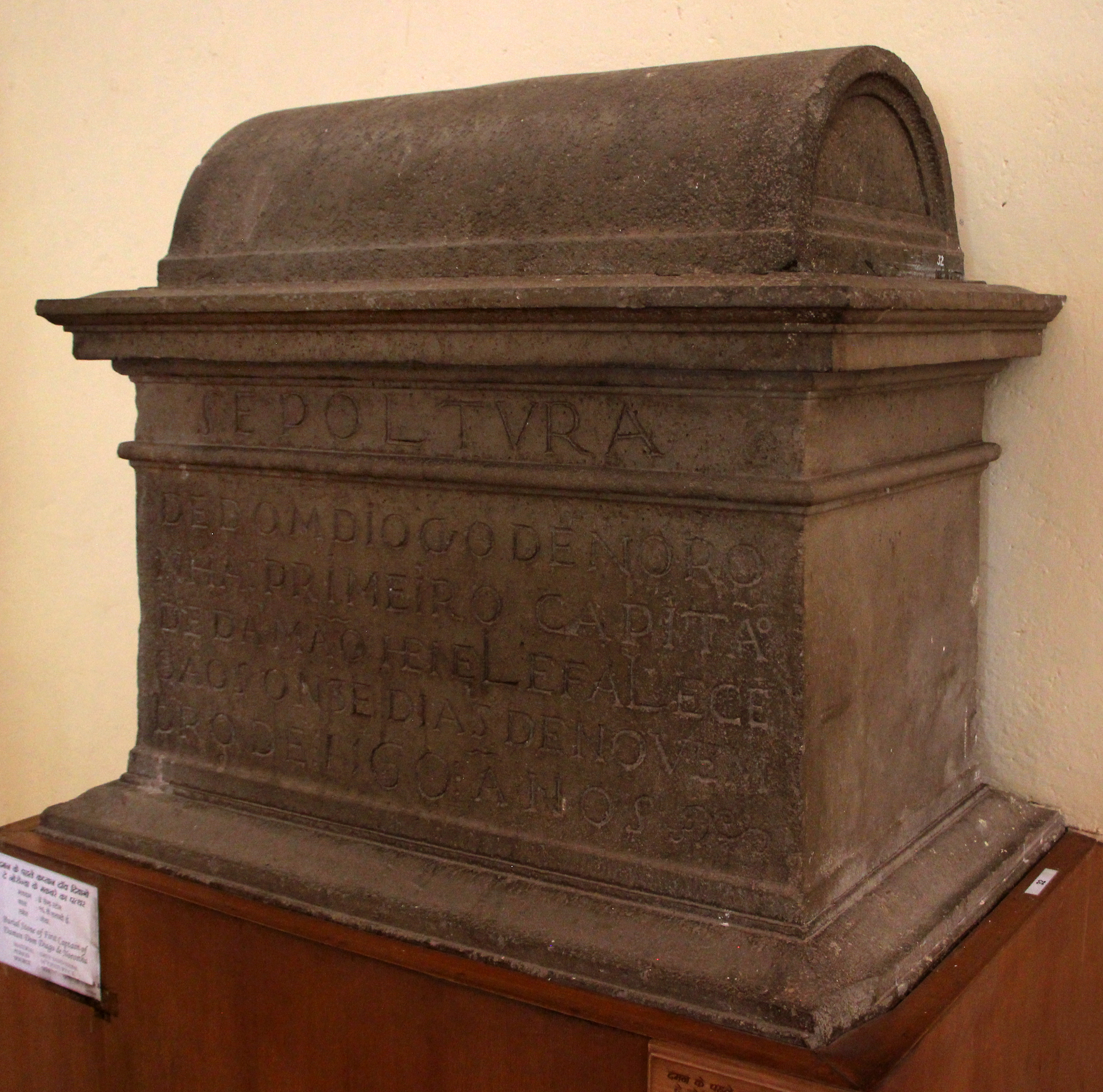
Sarcophagus of Diogo de Noronha in the Archaeological Museum of Old Goa, India

Governor Barreto did not stick to his word concerning the conquest of Daman. Therefore, when the viceroy Dom Constantino de Braganza arrived, in September 1558, Dom Diogo de Noronha convinced him to use the huge fleet that governor Barreto had assembled to boast the conquest of Daman. Previously, he had already entered negotiations with the Gujarati court to achieve a peaceful concession of Daman but he still intended to detach military speaking. He was responsible for the successful occupation of Daman, in February 1559. As a reward, viceroy Braganza named him as the first captain of the city. Although he tried to convince several times the viceroy to proceed to the conquest of Surat, which would ensure the Portuguese control on the Gulf of Cambay, he was unsuccessful. Due to this, he had a major role in the fortification of Daman and also successfully expelled the Abyssian sieges of the city. But he died in 1560. After his death, the viceroy recognised Noronha had reason and tried unsuccessfully to occupy Surat.

== Legacy ==
Alongside, governor Francisco Barreto and viceroy Dom Constantino de Braganza, Dom Diogo de Noronha had a crucial role in the creation of the Northern Province of the Portuguese Estado da India. Either with his action as captain of Diu or of Daman, Noronha had a sort of paternal role in the double-sizzling of this province that would become one of the crucial backbones for the sustention of Portuguese Asia for centuries.
