= Seydi Ali Reis =

Turkish admiral and navigator

- Born: 1498; Galata, Ottoman Empire
- Died: 1563 (aged 64–65); Constantinople, Ottoman Empire
- Known for: Writing several books of travel, navigation and astronomy

Seydi Ali Reis (1498–1563), formerly also written Sidi Ali Reis and Sidi Ali Ben Hossein, was an Ottoman admiral and navigator. Known also as Katib-i Rumi, Galatalı or Sidi Ali Çelebi, he commanded the left wing of the Ottoman fleet at the naval Battle of Preveza in 1538. He was later promoted to the rank of fleet admiral of the Ottoman fleet in the Indian Ocean, and as such, encountered the Portuguese forces based in the Indian city of Goa on several occasions in 1554. Seydi was able to unite several Muslim countries on the coast of the Arabian Sea (such as the Makran Sultanate, Gujarat Sultanate, and Adal Sultanate) against the Portuguese.

He is famous today for his books of travel such as the Mir'ât ül Memâlik (The Mirror of Countries, 1557) which describes the lands he has seen on his way back from India to Constantinople, and his books of navigation and astronomy, such as the Mir’ât-ı Kâinât (Mirror of the Universe) and the Kitâb ül Muhit: El Muhit fî İlmi'l Eflâk ve'l Buhûr (Book of the Regional Seas and the Science of Astronomy and Navigation) which contain information on navigation techniques, methods of determining direction, calculating time, using the compass, information on stars, sun and moon calendars, wind and sea currents, as well as portolan information regarding the ports, harbours, coastal settlements and islands in the various regions of the Ottoman Empire. His books are translated into numerous languages including English, French, Italian, German, Greek, Arabic, Persian, Urdu, Russian and Bengali and are considered among the finest literary works dating from the Ottoman period.

== Background ==
Seydi Ali Reis was born in the Galata across the Golden Horn from Constantinople as the son of a Turkish family which had its origins in Sinop on the Black Sea coast of Turkey. His grandfather was the Tersâne Kethüdâsı (Commander of the Ottoman Imperial Naval Arsenal) during the reign of Sultan Mehmed II, while his father, Hüseyin Reis, was the Kethüdâ (Commander) of the Bahriye Dârü's-Sınaası (Naval Industries Center) in Galata, at the northern shore of the Golden Horn. His father's career as a high-ranking seaman and naval engineer had an important influence on the future of Seydi Ali, who, at a young age, started working at the naval arsenal. Apart from his interest in seamanship, Seydi Ali also received a decent education on positive sciences such as mathematics, astronomy and geography. He also excelled in literature and theology, and was an accomplished poet. Within time he became a high-ranking officer at the naval arsenal and was promoted to the rank of Reis (used both for Captain and Admiral during the Ottoman period).

== Early career in the Ottoman Navy ==
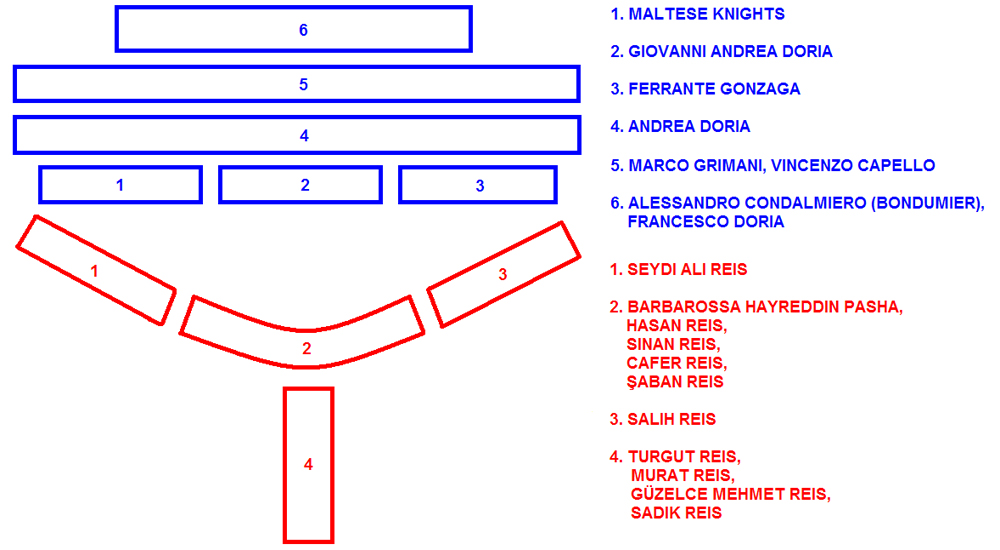
Seydi Ali Reis commanded the left wing of the Ottoman fleet at the naval Battle of Preveza in 1538

Starting from the Siege of Rhodes (1522), Seydi Ali Reis participated in every major naval campaign of the Ottoman Navy in the Mediterranean Sea. He commanded the left wing of the Ottoman fleet of Hayreddin Barbarossa Pasha which defeated the Holy League of Charles V under the command of Andrea Doria at the Battle of Preveza (1538). He also commanded several ships of the fleet of Sinan Pasha and Turgut Reis which conquered Tripoli in Libya from Spain and the Knights of Malta in 1551. He later took part in the Ottoman naval campaigns on the western coasts of the Mediterranean Sea.

Seydi Ali Reis was subsequently promoted to the ranks of Azepler Kâtibi, Tersâne Kethüdâsı (Commander of the Ottoman Imperial Naval Arsenal) and Hassa Donanma Reisi (Commander of the Ottoman Central Fleet).

== Commander of the Ottoman Indian Ocean Fleet ==
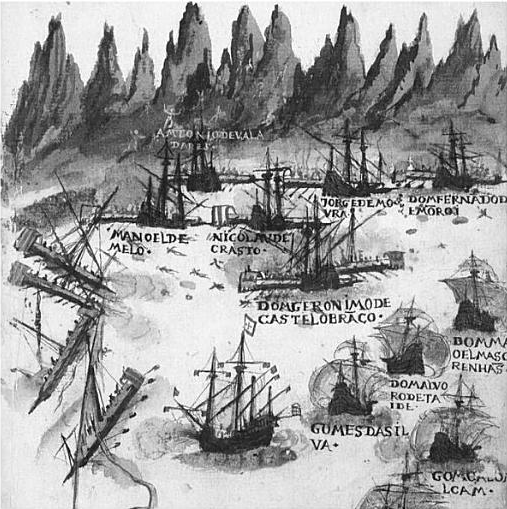
Portuguese ambush against the galleys of Seydi Ali Reis as depicted in the book Livro de Lisuarte de Abreu

While Sultan Suleiman the Magnificent was at his winter residence in Aleppo towards the end of 1552, he appointed Seydi Ali Reis as the new Commander of the Ottoman Indian Ocean Fleet, based in Suez (Egypt), with other homeports in Aden (Yemen) and Basra (Iraq). His predecessors in this rank included the famous Ottoman admiral and cartographer Piri Reis and admiral Koca Murat Reis, who had also participated in the Battle of Preveza in 1538.

Seydi Ali Reis departed from Aleppo on 7 December 1553 and, after visiting numerous religious sites and important cities in the region, finally arrived at Basra on the Persian Gulf towards the beginning of February 1554. His mission was to take the 15 Ottoman galleys anchored there, which were previously under the command of Piri Reis, to the chief homeport of the Ottoman Indian Ocean Fleet at Suez, on the Red Sea. Most of the 15 galleys were damaged in the previous encounters with the Portuguese fleet in the Indian Ocean. Seydi Ali Reis had the ships repaired and fitted them with new cannons, using the limited amount of resources and supplies which were available in Basra at that time.

About a month after the time of the monsoon came, Seydi Ali Reis had the troops embarked and the 15 galleys set sail towards Egypt. They were accompanied by the frigate of Sherifi Pasha until reaching the Strait of Hormuz. On the way to Hormuz, Seydi Ali Reis stopped at the ports of Arabia and Persia such as Bahrain, Dizful, Shushter, Bushehr, Qatif, Kish and Barhata. There was no sign of any Portuguese presence in the area, and the escort ship of Sherifi Pasha was sent back to Basra with the news that the Strait of Hormuz was safely passed. The 15 galleys of Seydi Ali Reis then proceeded by the coasts of Djilgar and Djadi on the Arabian Sea, past the towns of Keizzar/Leime, and 40 days after his departure from Basra, i.e., on the 10th day of the month of Ramadan, in the forenoon, suddenly encountered the Portuguese fleet (dispatched from its homeport in Goa) which consisted of 4 large ships, 3 galleons, 6 guard ships and 12 galleys - a total of 25 vessels. The two fleets almost immediately engaged each other, and one of the Portuguese galleons was sunk during the initial exchange of cannon fire. The bitter fighting, which caused serious damage on both sides, continued until sunset, when the Portuguese commander ordered retreat with the signal-gun and withdrew his forces towards the Strait of Hormuz. The night was calm and the wind was favourable as the Ottoman fleet sailed towards Khorfakkan, where Seydi Ali Reis replenished his ships with water, before reaching Oman (Sohar). Seventeen days after the encounter with the Portuguese fleet, Seydi Ali Reis reached Muscat and Qalhat on the night of Kadir Gecesi, an important night in the holy month of Ramadan. In the morning that followed, Captain Kuya, the son of the Portuguese governor of Muscat, came out of the harbour with a fleet of 12 large ships and 22 galleons - 34 vessels in all. They carried a large number of troops. Soon the Portuguese and Ottoman forces confronted each other and both sides lost 5 vessels during the battle, the surviving crews of which were taken by the intact ships of the respective fleets, while some of them managed to land on the Arabian shore. Due to the strong currents and winds, both fleets were dragged eastwards during the encounter. Towards the night, the fleet of Seydi Ali Reis, including the Portuguese ships which were captured and towed behind the remaining Ottoman galleys, reached the Bay of Oman, but was not allowed to land by the locals. Seydi Ali Reis thus set sail eastwards, towards the open seas, and finally reached the coasts of Djash, in the province of Kerman, Iran. Despite the length of the coast, Seydi Ali Reis could find no harbour, and the Ottoman galleys roamed about for two days before they reached Kish-i Mehran. As the evening was far advanced the Ottomans could not land immediately, but had to spend another night at sea. In the morning, a dry wind carried off many of the crew, and at last, the forces of Seydi Ali Reis approached the harbor of Sheba.

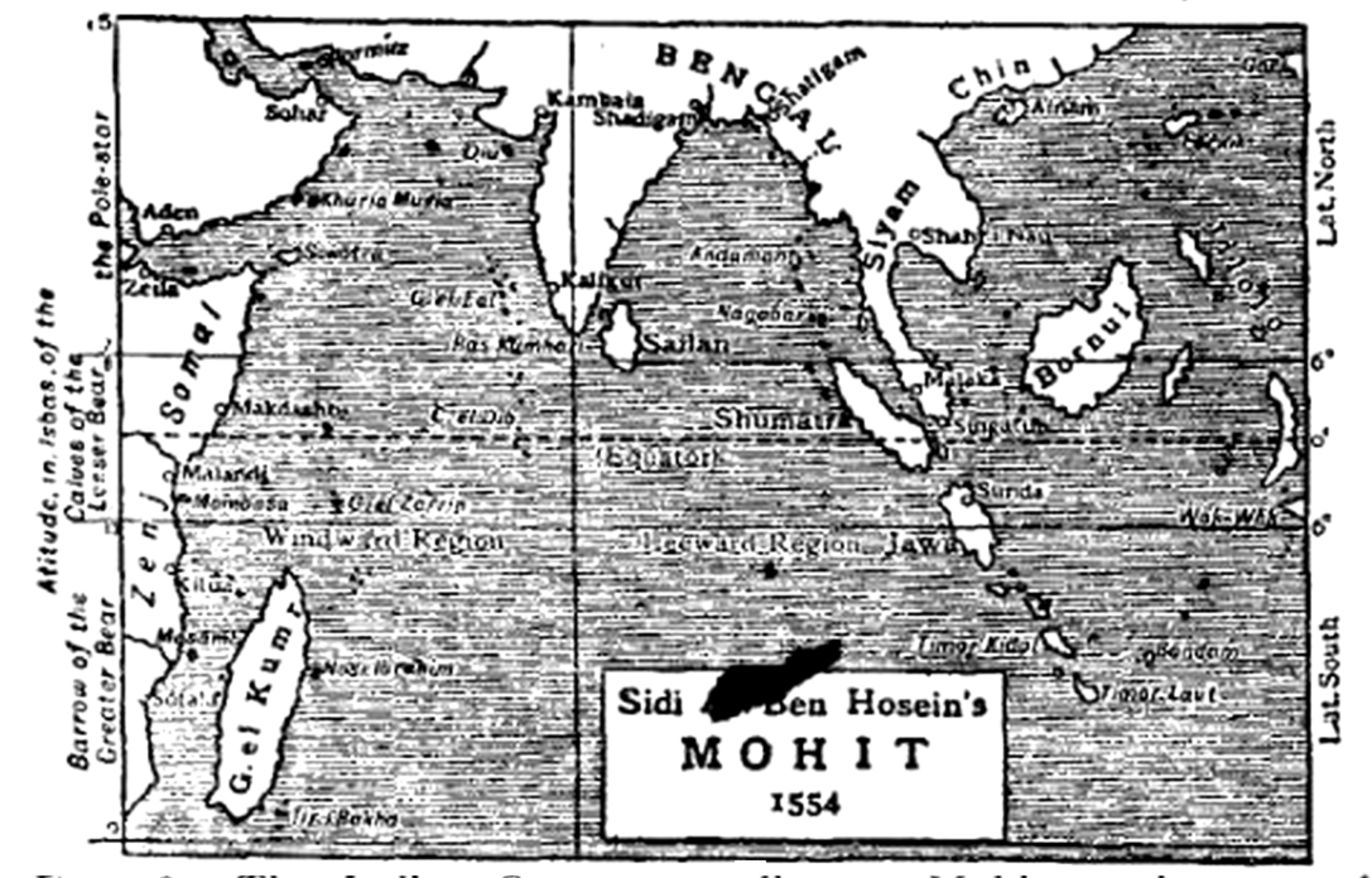
A 1911 map reconstructed from the data in Seydi Ali Reis's 1554 Mohit

There the Ottomans came across a brigantine, laden with spoils, whose watchman sighted and hailed the Ottoman galleys. The captain of the brigantine supplied the ships of Seydi Ali Reis with water, invigorating the Ottoman soldiers who had completely run out of supplies. Escorted by the brigantine's captain, the galleys of Seydi Ali Reis entered the harbour of Gwadar. The people there were Baluch and their chief was Malik Jelaleddin, the son of Malik Dinar. The Governor of Gwadar came on board Seydi Ali's ship and assured him of his unalterable devotion to Suleiman the Magnificent. He promised that henceforth, if at any time the Ottoman fleet should come to Hormuz, he would undertake to send 50 or 60 boats to supply them with provisions, and in every possible way to be of service to the Ottomans. Seydi Ali Reis wrote a letter to the native Prince Jelaleddin to ask for a pilot, upon which a first-class pilot was sent to him, with the assurance that he was thoroughly trustworthy and entirely devoted to the interests of the Ottomans.

== Dragged to Gujarat: Elephant Typhoon in the Indian Ocean ==
With a favorable wind Seydi Ali Reis left the port of Gwadar and again steered for Yemen. They had been at sea for several days, and had arrived nearly opposite to Zofar and Shar, when suddenly from the west arose a great storm known as the Fil Tufanı (Elephant Typhoon). The Ottoman fleet were driven back and were unable to set the sails, not even the trinquetla (stormsail). Night and day were both alike, and because of the frailty of the ships all ballast had to be thrown overboard. For ten days the storm raged continuously and the rain came down in torrents.

Seydi Ali Reis did all he could to encourage and cheer his companions, and advised them above all things to be brave, and never to doubt that all would end well. A welcome diversion occurred in the appearance of an "enormously large fish (probably a whale) about the size of two galley lengths, or more perhaps", which the pilot declared to be a good omen.

The color of the water suddenly changed to pure white, and at the sight of it the pilot broke forth into loud lamentations: he declared they were approaching whirlpools and eddies. Seydi Ali Reis mentions in the Mir'ât ül Memâlik ("The Mirror of Countries") that such whirlpools were found only on the coasts of Abyssinia and in the neighborhood of Sindh in the Bay of Debal (modern Karachi, Pakistan), and hardly ever a ship was known to escape their fury. After drifting for the entire night and day that followed, the water finally rose, the storm somewhat abated, and the ship veered right round.

The next morning the fleet of Seydi Ali Reis slackened speed and drew in the sails. A stalwart sailor was tied to the mast, whereby the post at the foot of the mizzenmast was weighted down, and the sailrope slightly raised. Taking a survey of their surroundings, the sailor caught sight of an idol-temple on the coast of Djamher. The sails were drawn in a little more; the ships passed Formyan and Menglir, and directing their course toward Somnath, they passed by that place also. Finally Seydi Ali Reis came to Diu, but for fear of being attacked by the idol-worshippers who dwelt there, the Ottomans drew in their sails and continued on their course. Meanwhile, the wind had risen again, and as the men had no control over the rudder, large handles had to be affixed with long double ropes fastened to them. Each rope was taken hold of by four men, and so with great exertion they managed to control the rudder. No one could keep on his feet on deck, so of course it was impossible to walk across. The noise was deafening; and the crewmen could not hear their own voices. The only means of communication with the sailors was by inarticulate words, and neither the captain nor boatswain could for a single instant leave his post.

After an exhausting voyage, Seydi Ali Reis and his men reached Gujarat in India - which part of it, however, they did not know. When the pilot suddenly exclaimed: "On your guard! a whirlpool in front!" the anchors were quickly lowered, but the ship was dragged down with great force and nearly submerged. The rowers had left their seats, the panic-stricken crew threw off their clothes, and, clinging some to casks and some to jacks, had taken leave of one another. Seydi Ali Reis also stripped entirely, gave his slaves their liberty, and vowed to give 100 florins to the poor of Mecca in case of survival. By that time two more anchors broke off and were lost, the ship gave a terrible jerk, and in another instant they were clear of the breakers. The pilot declared that, had they been wrecked off Fisht-Kidsur, a place between Diu and Daman, nothing could have saved them. Once more the sails were set, and Seydi Ali Reis decided to head towards India - duly taking note of the tides and currents, and having made a careful study of the charts, he had come to the conclusion that they could not be very far off from the Indian mainland. He examined the hold of the ship and found that the storeroom was submerged, in some places up to the walls, in some places higher still. They had shipped much water, and all hands set to work at once to bale it out. In one or two places the bottom had to be ripped up to find the outlet so as to reduce the water.

Towards the afternoon the weather had cleared a little, and they found themselves about 2 miles off the port of Daman, in Gujarat, India. The other ships had already arrived, but some of the galleys were waterlogged not far from the shore, and they had thrown overboard oars, boats, and casks, the wreckage of which eventually was borne ashore by the rapidly rising tide. Seydi Ali Reis and his men were obliged to lie for another five days and five nights, exposed to a strong spring-tide, accompanied by floods of rain; for they were now in the monsoon, or "rainy season" of India, and there was nothing for it but to submit to their fate. During all this time they never once saw the sun by day, nor the stars by night; they could neither use their clocks nor their compasses, and all on board anticipated the worst. It seemed a miracle that of the 3 ships lying there, thrown on their sides, the whole crew eventually got safely to land.

== Days in Gujarat ==
After landing at Gujarat, Seydi Ali Reis proceeded to the Fortress of Daman and received permission from Malik Esed, the Governor of Daman to whom he accepted to leave the armament of his ships, the permission for himself and his men to freely roam the coastline and the mainland. Many of his crewmen decided to stay there and enter the service of Malik Esed, and Seydi Ali Reis sailed to Surat with the few loyal crewmen who remained on board of his ship. They reached Surat 3 full months after departing from Basra.

Seydi Ali Reis established good relations with Sultan Ahmad Shah III, the 12-year-old new ruler of Gujarat whose ascension to the throne was challenged by a nobleman named Nasir-ul-Mulk who simultaneously declared himself as the new sultan and captured the stronghold of Burudj. In the meantime, Nasir-ul-Mulk had offered the coastal ports of Gujarat to the Portuguese in exchange for their support against the young Sultan Ahmed who immediately collected an army to march on Burudj. When the sultan was informed of the arrival of the Ottomans, he took 200 gunners and other men from their troops and advanced towards Burudj. On the third day of the fighting, Seydi Ali Reis and his men -who were left behind- were attacked by the Portuguese captains of Goa, Diu, Shiyul, Besai, and the Provador; five in all, commanding 7 large galleons and 80 other ships. The Ottoman fleet went ashore, pitched their tents, and threw up entrenchments; for two whole months Seydi Ali Reis and his men were busy preparing for battle. The tyrant Nasir-ul-Mulk, who had joined with the Portuguese, had hired assassins to kill Seydi Ali Reis; who were, however, discovered by the guard and fled. Meanwhile, Sultan Ahmed had taken the stronghold of Burudj and sent two of his officers, Khudavend and Djihanghir, with elephants and troops to Surat, while he proceeded to Ahmedabad, where a youth, called Ahmed, a relative of Sultan Ahmed, had in the meantime raised a revolt. A battle followed, in which the usurper was wounded, Hasan Ehan, one of his adherents, killed, and his army put to fight. As Sultan Ahmed reascended his throne, and, as Nasir-ul-Mulk died of vexation over his misfortunes, peace was once more restored in Gujarat.

When the Portuguese heard of this, they sent an envoy to Khudavand Khan to say that they did not mind so much about Surat, but that their hostility was chiefly directed towards the Ottoman admiral. The Portuguese demanded that Seydi Ali Reis should be given up to them, but their request was refused. It turned out that a runaway Christian gunner from one of the ships of Seydi Ali Reis had enlisted on the ship of the Portuguese envoy, and, knowing a good deal about the affairs of the Ottomans, he had undertaken to prevent their departure from India after the holiday of Kurban (Eid).

The troops of Seydi Ali Reis began to lose hope for return and became more and more dissatisfied. In Surat, Khudavend Khan had been paying them from 50 to 60 paras per day, and in Burudj, Adil Khan had done the same. At last their pent-up feelings burst forth and they argued as follows: "It is now nearly two years since we have received any pay, our goods are lost, and the ships dismantled; the hulks are old, and our return to Egypt is practically made impossible." The end was that the greater part of the crewmen of Seydi Ali Reis took service in Gujarat, where they decided to stay.

The deserted ships, with all their tools and implements, were given over to Khudavend Khan, under condition that he should immediately remit to the Sublime Porte the price agreed upon for the sale (see also: Mughal Weapons).

== Overland journey back to the Ottoman Empire ==
After receiving a confirmatory note, both from Khudavend Khan and Adil Khan, Seydi Ali Reis started on his journey to Ahmedabad in the end of November 1554, accompanied by Mustafa Agha, the Kethüda (chief officer) of the Janissaries, and Ali Agha, the captain of the gunners (both of whom had remained faithful to Seydi Ali Reis), together with about 50 men. A few days took them from Burudj to Belodra, and from there they proceeded to Champanir.

After a great many difficulties they at last arrived in Mahmudabad, and after a journey of 50 days in Ahmedabad, the capital of Gujarat. There, Seydi Ali Reis visited the Sultan, his Grand Vizier Imad-ul-Mulk, and other dignitaries. The Sultan, to whom Seydi Ali Reis presented his credentials, was pleased to receive him most graciously and he assured him of his devotion to Suleiman the Magnificent. He gave Seydi Ali Reis a horse, a team of camels, and money for the journey.

A few days after this, Sultan Ahmad offered Seydi Ali Reis the command of the Province of Burudj, with a very large income, but he kindly refused the generous offer.

Amongst the learned people of the land of the Banians, there was a tribe which they called the "Bhats", whose business was to escort merchants or travelers from one land into another, and for a very small remuneration they guaranteed their perfect safety. The Muslims of Ahmedabad gave Seydi Ali Reis two such Bhats as an escort, and so, about the middle of Safar of the said year, Seydi Ali Reis started his overland journey to the Ottoman Empire.

Seydi Ali Reis and his few remaining men first headed towards Lahore, before they went to Delhi for receiving the permission of passing through the lands of the Timurid Mughal Sultan Humayun, who hosted them with similar hospitality and politeness, whose equally generous work offer was kindly refused by Seydi Ali Reis and his men. In February 1556 Seydi Ali Reis departed for Kabul, from where he headed first to Semerkand and later to Bukhara, where his men were attacked by a group of Uzbeks. Despite this initial hostility across Transoxiana, Seydi Ali Reis and his men were warmly welcomed and hosted for 15 days by the ruler of Bukhara, Seid Burhan. Seydi Ali Reis later headed to Khwarezm, Khorasan, Iraq and Anatolia, finally reaching Constantinople after two years and three months of voyage since their departure from Surat in India.

== Back in Constantinople ==
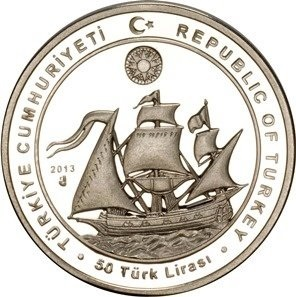
The flagship of Seydi Ali Reis on a 50 lira coin

Once in Constantinople, Seydi Ali Reis wanted to reach Suleiman the Magnificent and declare his apologies for the natural disaster that his fleet had to deal with. Learning that the Sultan was in Edirne (Adrianople), Seydi Ali Reis headed there and presented the letters sent to Suleiman by the 18 sultans and rulers of the countries that he passed through during his long and difficult voyage back home.

Sultan Suleiman received Seydi Ali Reis with understanding and compassion, and appointed him as the Müteferrika of the Dergâh-ı âlî, with a daily salary of 80 akçe. The Sultan also ordered the 4-year salary (ulufe) which Seydi Ali Reis was entitled to during his absence to be also paid. In 1560, Rüstem Pasha pushed for Seydi Ali Reis to be reappointed the admiral of the Indian Ocean fleet, but the governor of Egypt Sofu Hadım Ali Pasha blocked this move. Instead, Sefer Reis was promoted to the supreme command of the Ottoman Empire's entire Indian Ocean fleet.

Seydi Ali Reis wrote his famous books such as the Mir'ât ül Memâlik (The Mirror of Countries, 1557) in this period. He also wrote many poems, under the nickname Kâtib-i Rumî (Bookman of Anatolia).

Seydi Ali Reis died in Constantinople in January 1563.

== See also ==
- Mirat ul Memalik
- Ottoman naval expeditions in the Indian Ocean
- Ottoman Navy

== Literature ==
- Finkel, Caroline, Osman's Dream, (Basic Books, 2005), 57; "Istanbul was only adopted as the city's official name in 1930..
- Charles F. Horne, ed., The Sacred Books and Early Literature of the East, (New York: Parke, Austin, & Lipscomb, 1917)
