= João de Castro =

Portuguese explorer (1500–1548)

Dom João de Castro
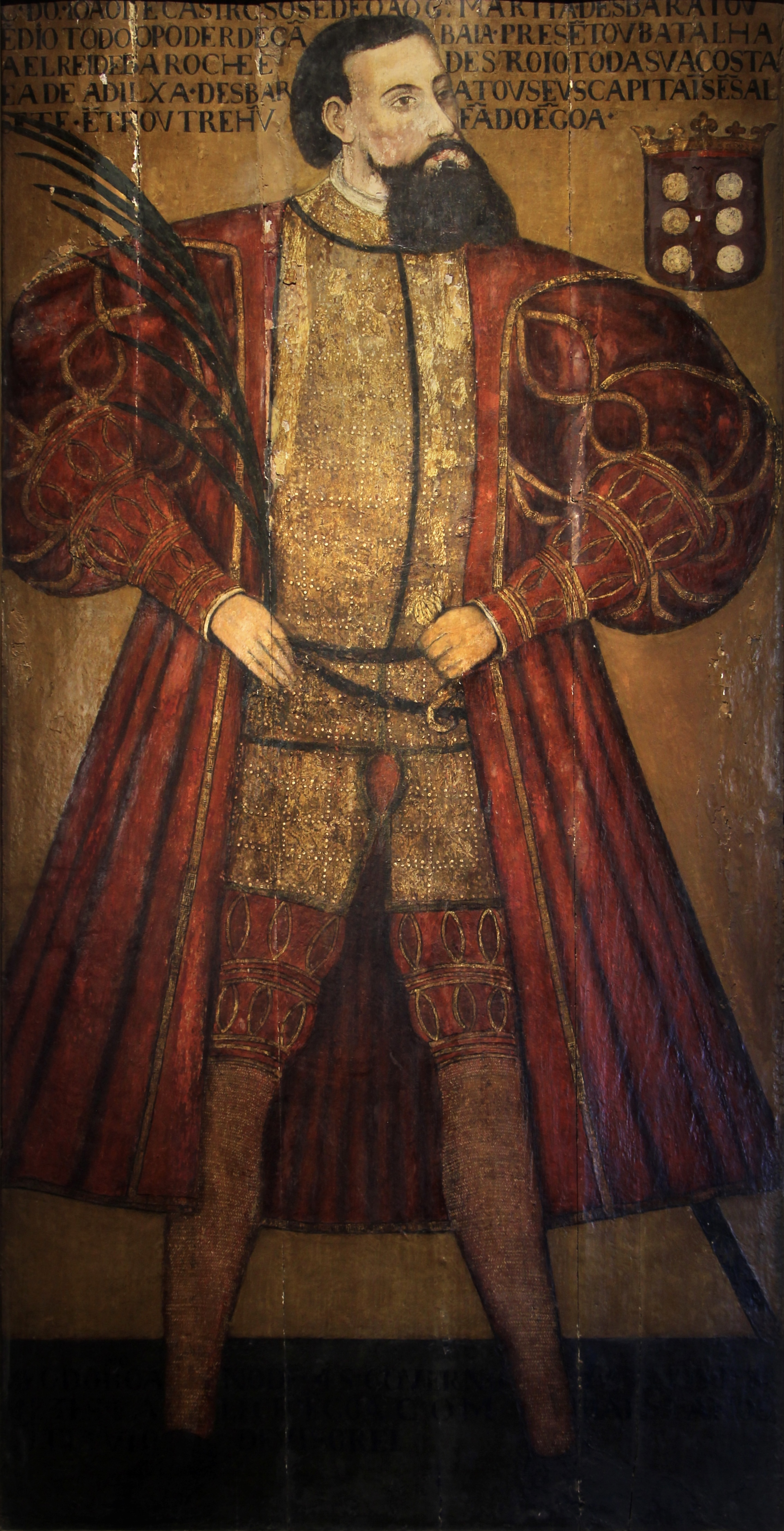

Viceroy of Portuguese India
- In office 1545 – 6 June 1548
- Monarch: John III
- Preceded by: Martim Afonso de Sousa
- Succeeded by: Garcia de Sá

Personal details
- Born: 27 February 1500 Lisbon, Portugal
- Died: 6 June 1548 (aged 48) Goa, Portuguese India
- Spouse: Leonor Coutinho
- Parent: Álvaro de Castro (father)

Military service
- Allegiance: Portuguese Empire
- Battles/wars: Ottoman–Portuguese conflicts; Conquest of Tunis (1535); Siege of Diu (1538); Siege of Diu (1546)

Dom João de Castro (27 February 1500 – 6 June 1548) was a Portuguese nobleman, scientist, writer and colonial administrator, who served as the fourth Portuguese Viceroy of India from 1545 to 1548. He was called Strong Castro (Portuguese: Castro Forte) by the poet Luís de Camões. De Castro was the second son of Álvaro de Castro, the civil governor of Lisbon. His wife was Leonor Coutinho.

== Early life ==
As the younger son of Álvaro de Castro, João was destined for the church. He studied mathematics under Pedro Nunes, along with Luis, Duke of Beja, son of King Manuel I of Portugal, with whom he formed a lifelong friendship. At eighteen, he went to Tangier for several years, where he was knighted by Dom Duarte de Menezes, the governor.

== Voyages to India and the expedition to Egypt ==
In 1535 de Castro accompanied Dom Luís to the siege of Tunis, where he refused knighthood and rewards from Emperor Charles V. When de Castro returned to Lisbon, the king awarded him the commendation of São Paulo de Salvaterra in the Order of Christ in 1538.

Soon after, de Castro left for India with his uncle Garcia de Noronha, and participated in the relief of Diu upon his arrival at Goa. In 1540 he served on an expedition to Suez under Estêvão da Gama (the son of Vasco da Gama and then viceroy of India), who knighted his son, Álvaro de Castro in recognition of D. João. After Noronha's death, da Gama succeeded him, and de Castro joined da Gama on an expedition to the Red Sea. Da Gama departed on 31 December 1540, with 12 large galleons (one of which was captained by de Castro) and carracks, and 60 galleys.

De Castro kept a detailed journal of the voyage with maps, calculations, pictures, and detailed notes of the coasts of the Arabian Peninsula and regions that are known as Somalia, Eritrea, Ethiopia, Sudan, and Egypt today. He traveled to Suez and other ports on the shores of the Sinai Peninsula, all included in the Roteiro do Mar Roxo.

Unlike other viceroys, Castro was interested in Indian culture and religion. He collaborated with the humanist André de Resende to write a book on Indian art. His estate of Penha Verde, in Sintra, contains the two famous black stones of Cambay, retrieved by de Castro and his son.

== Later life ==
Returning to Portugal, de Castro was named commander of a fleet in 1543 to clear Atlantic Europe of pirates. In 1545 he was sent to India with six ships to replace governor Martim Afonso de Sousa. Seconded by his sons (one of whom, Fernão, was killed) and by João Mascarenhas, de Castro overthrew Mahmud, King of Gujarat, and defeated the army of the Adil Khan. He also captured Bharuch, subjugated Malacca, and traveled in António Moniz's passage into Ceylon. In 1547, he was appointed to be viceroy by King João III of Portugal due to his victory at the second siege of Diu.

After the victory of his Armada in the relief of Diu, he asked the king to not prolong his term of office beyond the ordinary three years and to allow him to return to the Sintra Mountains in Portugal. After his victory over Mahmud and the Adil Khan, de Castro rebuilt Diu with the money received from the citizens of Goa. He did not live long enough to fulfill this goal, and died in the arms of his friend, Saint Francis Xavier, on 6 June 1548.

He was buried at Goa before his remains were exhumed and transported to Portugal to be reinterred in the convent of Benfica.

== The terrestrial magnetism in the Roteiro from Lisbon to Goa: the experiences of João de Castro ==
The ancient Greeks had discovered that a dark metallic stone could attract or repel objects of iron. During the voyage, the navigators could not find a ship at sea by longitude because determining this required a clock on board to indicate the exact time at the reference median, and the astronomical determination of longitude gave unacceptable errors. On the trip to India, de Castro carried out a series of experiments that succeeded in detecting the phenomenon with the magnetic needle on board. When de Castro attempted to determine the latitude of Mozambique on 5 August 1538, he noted the deviation of the needle 128 years before Guillaume Dennis (1666) of Nieppe, who is normally credited with this discovery. He observed a magnetic phenomenon on 22 December 1538 near Bassein, which was confirmed four centuries later. De Castro refuted the theory that the variation of magnetic declination is formed by geographic meridians.

De Castro's recorded values of magnetic declination in the Atlantic and Indian Oceans in the sixteenth century were useful for the study of terrestrial magnetism. He made 43 observations of magnetic declination through measurements of geomagnetic declination over the entire route around Africa. The instrument he used was the Bussola de Variacão, which was developed by Felipe Guillén a decade earlier in Seville. He discovered spatial variations of declination in the bay of Bombay (near Bassein), which he attributed to the disturbing effects of underwater rock masses. In the 1890s, G. Hellman, quoted by Chapman and Bartels (1940), considered de Castro to be the most important representative of scientific maritime investigations of the time, and the method he tested was universally introduced on ships and used until the end of the sixteenth century.

== Bibliography ==
- Jacinto Freire de Andrade Vida de D. João de Castro, Lisbon, 1651 (English translation by Sir Peter Wyche in 1664).
- Diogo de Couto, Décadas da Ásia, VI.
- The Roteiros, or logbooks of Castro's voyages in the East (Lisbon, 1833, 1843 and 1872) are of great interest.

| Preceded by Martim Afonso de Sousa (1542 – 1545) | Governor and Viceroy of Portuguese India; João de Castro (1545 - 6 June 1548) | Succeeded by Garcia de Sá (June, 1548 – 13 June 1549) |
