= Siege of Diu (1538) =

Portuguese victory against Gujarat in India

- Part of Ottoman–Portuguese confrontations and Gujarati–Portuguese conflicts
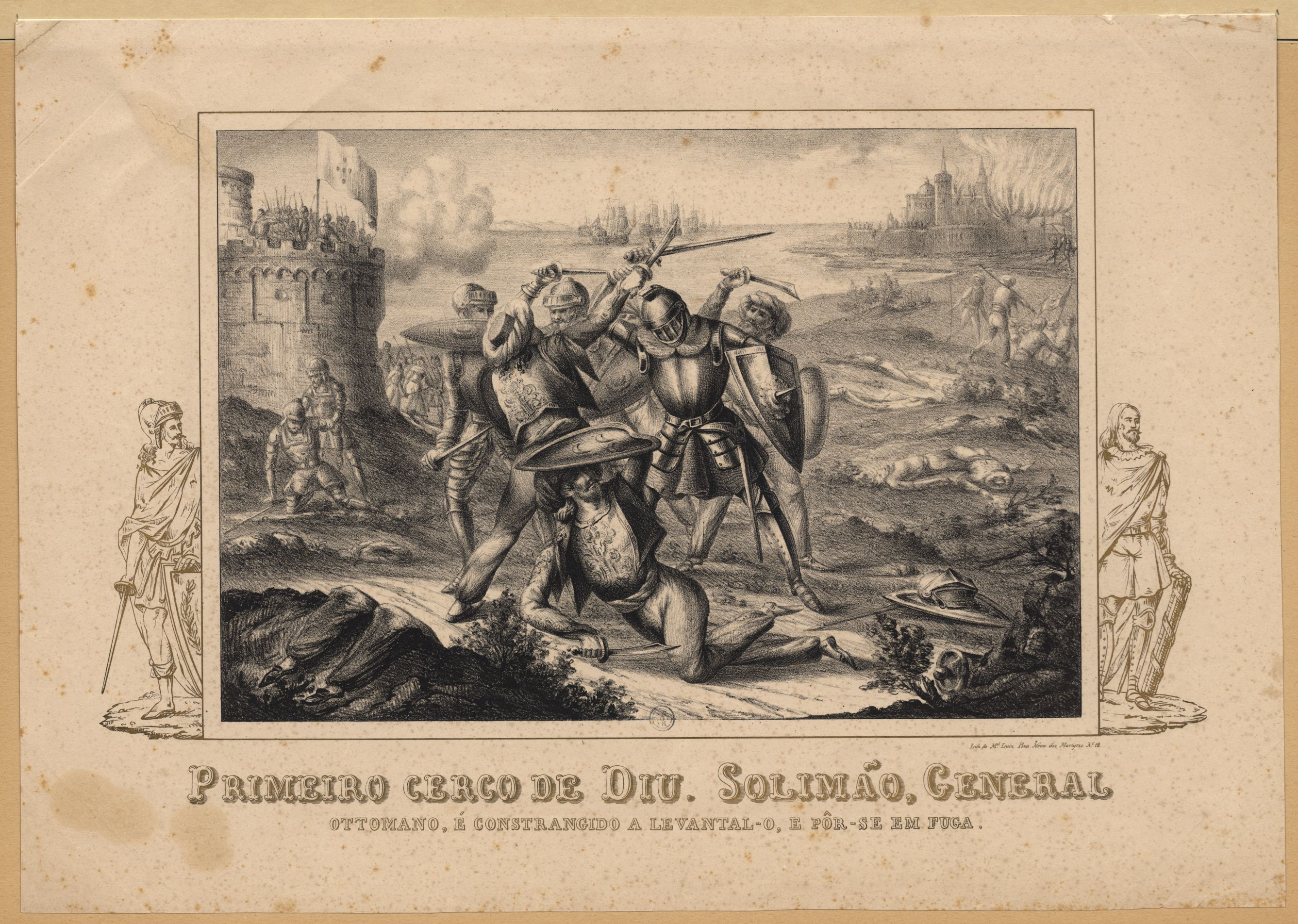
- First siege of Diu. Suleiman, Ottoman general, is constrained to lift it, and run away. Lithograph by Manuel Luís da Costa, 1840
Date	26 Jun 1538 – 6 November 1538 (4 months, 1 week and 4 days)
Location	Diu, Portuguese India 20.71°N 70.98°E
Result	Portuguese victory

Belligerents
Portuguese Empire	Ottoman Empire; Gujarat Sultanate

Commanders and leaders
António da Silveira; Martim Afonso de Sousa; Francisco Pacheco	Suleyman Pasha; Khadjar Safar (WIA)

Strength
600 men (garrison); 139 ships 186 cannon	16,000 Gujarati; 6,000 Ottomans; 79 ships 130 cannon

Casualties and losses
All but 40 killed or wounded	Unknown
- Location within India

The siege of Diu occurred when an army of the Sultanate of Gujarat under Khadjar Safar, aided by forces of the Ottoman Empire, attempted to capture the city of Diu in 1538, then held by the Portuguese. The siege was part of the Ottoman-Portuguese war. The Portuguese successfully resisted the four-month long siege.

== Background ==
In 1509, the major Battle of Diu (1509) took place between the Portuguese and a joint fleet of the Sultan of Gujarat, the Mamluk Sultanate of Egypt, the Zamorin of Calicut, with support of the Ottoman Empire. Since 1517, the Ottomans had attempted to combine forces with Gujarat in order to fight the Portuguese away from the Red Sea and in the area of India. Pro-Ottoman forces under Captain Hoca Sefer had been installed by Selman Reis in Diu.

Diu in Gujarat (now a state in western India), was with Surat, one of the main points of supply of spices to Ottoman Egypt at that time. However, Portuguese intervention thwarted that trade by controlling the traffic in the Red Sea. In 1530, the Venetians could not obtain any supply of spices through Egypt.

Under the command of Governor Nuno da Cunha, the Portuguese had attempted to capture Diu by force in February 1531, unsuccessfully. Thereafter, the Portuguese waged war on Gujarat, devastating its shores and several cities like Surat.

Soon after however, the Sultan of Gujarat, Bahadur Shah, who was under threat from the Mughal emperor Humayun, made an agreement with the Portuguese, granting them Diu in exchange for Portuguese assistance against the Mughals and protection should the realm fall. The Portuguese seized the stronghold of Gogala (Bender-i Türk) near the city, and built the Diu Fort. Once the threat from Humayun was removed, Bahadur tried to negotiate the withdrawal of the Portuguese, but on 13 February 1537 he died drowning during the negotiations on board a Portuguese ship in unclear circumstances, both sides blaming the other for the tragedy.

Bahadur Shah had also appealed to the Ottomans to expel the Portuguese, which led to the 1538 expedition.

== Ottoman fleet ==
Upon the arrival of Sultan Bahadur's envoy to Egypt with a large tribute in 1536, the Ottoman governor (pasha) of Egypt, 60-year-old eunuch Hadim Suleiman Pasha, was nominated by Sultan Suleiman the Magnificent to organize and personally lead an expedition to India. Sultan Suleiman instructed the pasha to wage a "holy war... and to capture and hold those Indian posts and to avenge the evil deeds of the Portuguese infidels". Pasha Suleiman forbade any shipping out of the Red Sea to avoid leaking information to the Portuguese in India. He also secured funds for the expedition by executing many wealthy individuals and seizing their property. There were delays however due to the siege of Coron in the Mediterranean, and the Ottoman–Safavid war of 1533–1535.

According to the Tarikh al-Shihri, Ottoman forces amounted to 80 vessels and 40,000 men. Others sources state 70 vessels. Gaspar Correia provided a more specific account, claiming that the Turks assembled at Suez an armada composed of 15 "bastard galleys" (it), 40 "royal galleys", 6 galliots, 5 galleons "with four masts each" that were "dangerous ships to sail, for they were shallow with no keel"; five smaller craft, six foists from Gujarat, and two brigs. It carried over 400 artillery pieces in total, over 10,000 sailors and rowers (of which 1,500 were Christian) and 6,000 soldiers, of which 1,500 were janissaries. The Pasha employed a Venetian renegade, Francisco, as captain of 10 galleys, plus 800 Christian mercenaries. Some sailors were forcibly conscripted from Venetian galleys then at Alexandria. 200 soldiers were executed for protesting being put to oars duty. On 20 July 1538 the armada set sail from Jeddah, stopping by Kamaran Island before proceeding to Aden.

At Aden, Pasha Suleiman captured the city after inviting its ruler, Sheikh Amir bin Dawaud, favourable towards the Portuguese, aboard his ships, then hanging him. Thus, Aden was occupied without a siege, and plundered.

The expedition left Aden on 19 August and then called at Socotra, thereafter making its way to the western coast of Gujarat, despite losing some ships that got separated from the fleet during the passage of the Indian Ocean. It was the largest Ottoman fleet ever sent into the Indian Ocean.

== Siege ==
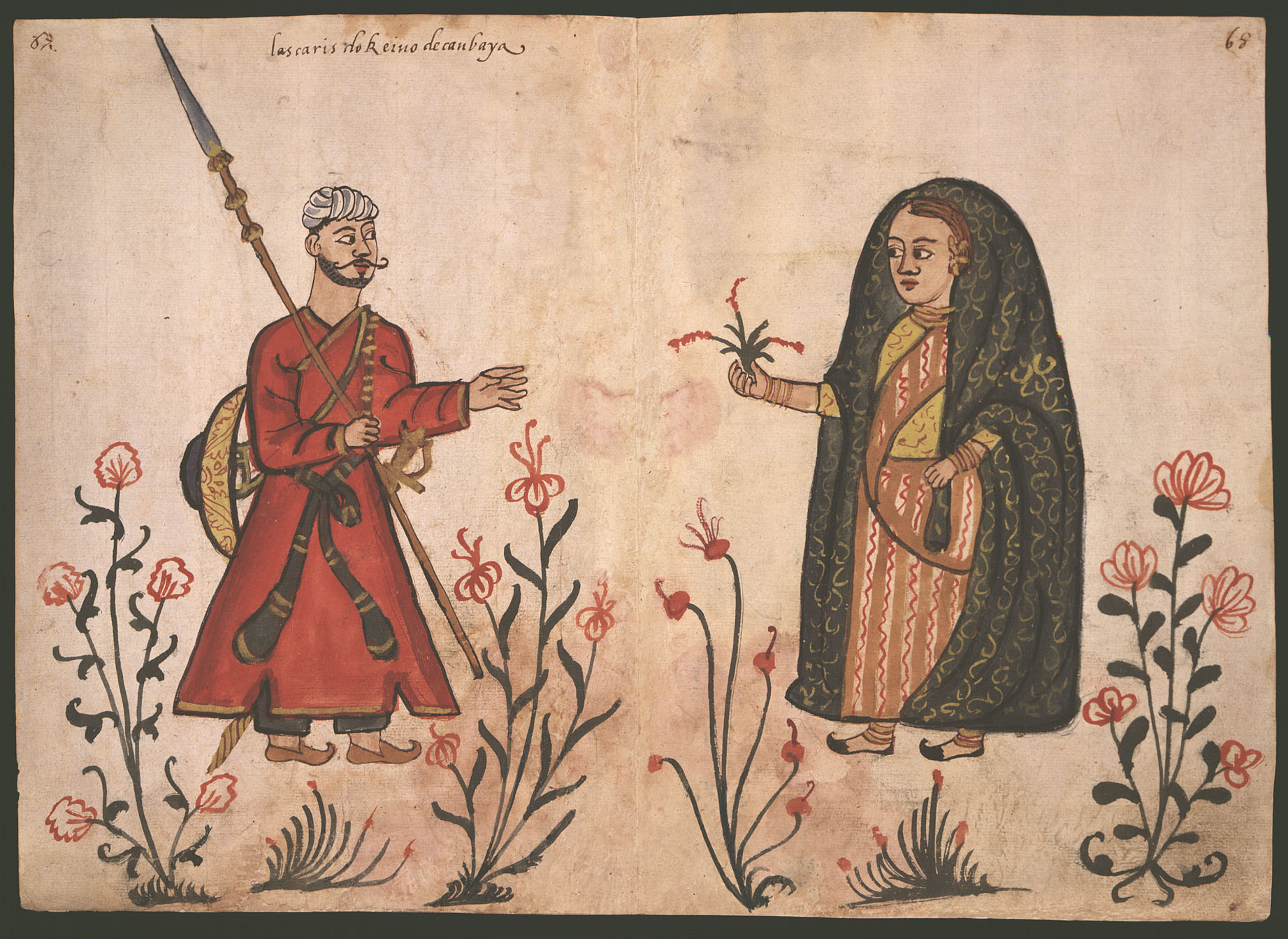
Portuguese depiction of a Gujarati foot-soldier (and his wife)

The captain of Diu at the time was the experienced António da Silveira, former captain of Bassein and Hormuz who had participated in the Portuguese-Gujarati War of 1531–34. The Portuguese fortress housed about 3,000 people, of which solely 600 were soldiers.

=== First attacks ===
After the death of Bahadur, his successor assembled an army that numbered 10,000 footmen and 5,000 horsmen at Champaner. He was instigated by the lord of Surat Khadjar Safar – Coge Sofar in Portuguese, an Albanian renegade from Otranto and an influential lord in Gujarat. Upon receiving information of the impending siege, António da Silveira prepared for a long and difficult siege. He had the passage points onto the island guarded, though there was a lack of everything inside the fort.

Under the command of Khadjar Safar, the Gujarati forces began crossing the channel of Diu onto the western side of the island on 26 June 1538, being held back by the city's western walls just long enough for the Portuguese to fill their water reserves and burn their supply storages in the city before finally retreating to the fortress on the eastern end of the island. Coge Sofar was initially repulsed, but after the bulk of the Gujarati army arrived, Silveira realized he could not hold them back with so small a force as his and retreated. Coge Sofar and general Alu Cham then took control of the city.

For the following two months the Gujaratis were unable to threaten the besieged with more than a low-intensity bombardment, while the Portuguese conducted occasional raids on the Gujarati positions.

When António da Silveira received reports of the possible arrival of an Ottoman fleet, he dispatched a craft to Goa advising governor Nuno da Cunha to prepare a relief force. It left in August under one Miguel Vaz.

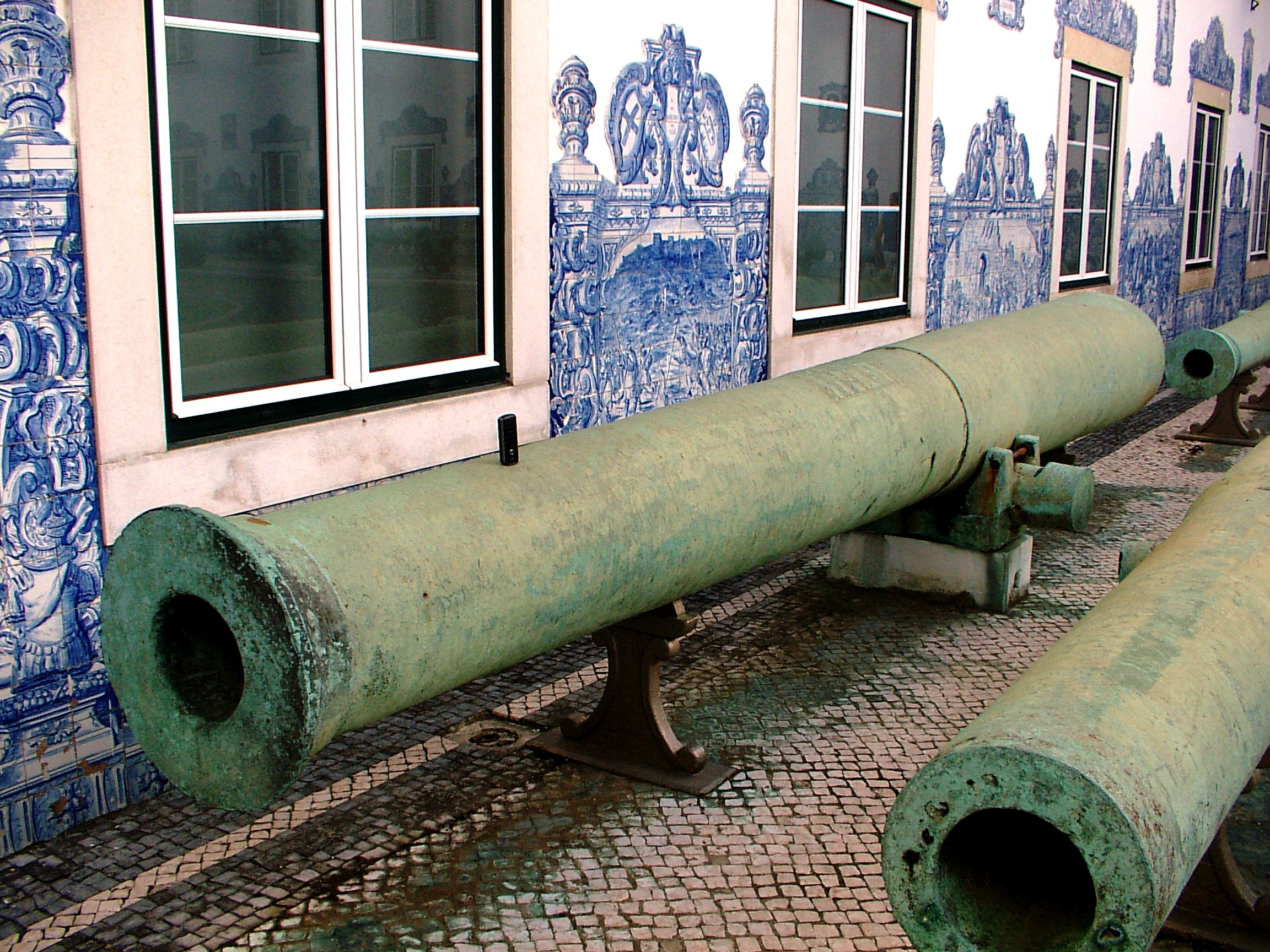
"Tiro de Diu", a Gujarati basilisk captured by the Portuguese in the 1538 siege.

Lopo de Sousa Coutinho, who would later write his memoirs on the siege, distinguished himself on 14 August after leading 14 Portuguese in a sortie into the city to capture supplies, defeating 400 soldiers of Khadjar Safar.

=== The arrival of the Ottoman fleet ===
On 4 September the Ottoman fleet arrived in Diu, catching the Portuguese garrison by surprise and thus blockading the fortress by sea. Captain da Silveira immediately sent a small craft to run the blockade with a distress call to Goa, while Pasha Suleiman promptly landed 600 to 700 janissaries, the following day on the 5th. The janissaries proceeded to plunder the city – causing Suleiman to fall out of favour with the lords of Gujarat except Khadjar Safar. The janissaries then attempted to scale the fortress' walls but were repelled with 50 dead. There was a respite on the 6th.

A strong storm fell upon Diu on 7 September, forcing the Ottomans to relocate their fleet to a sheltered harbour at Mahuwa, where they remained for twenty days, during which the Portuguese took the opportunity to strengthen their defenses, while a first relief fleet arrived. Four foists from Goa and Chaul arrived with reinforcements on 14 September. The storm damaged part of the Ottoman fleet (and helped the Portuguese restore their water supplies), after which the Turks began unloading their artillery and a further 1,000 men, and raising a number of defensive and siege works around the fort. It seems by then the Gujarati lords became distrustful of the Ottomans, possibly fearing that they might establish themselves in Diu after expelling the Portuguese, and the following day refused to provide any further supplies.

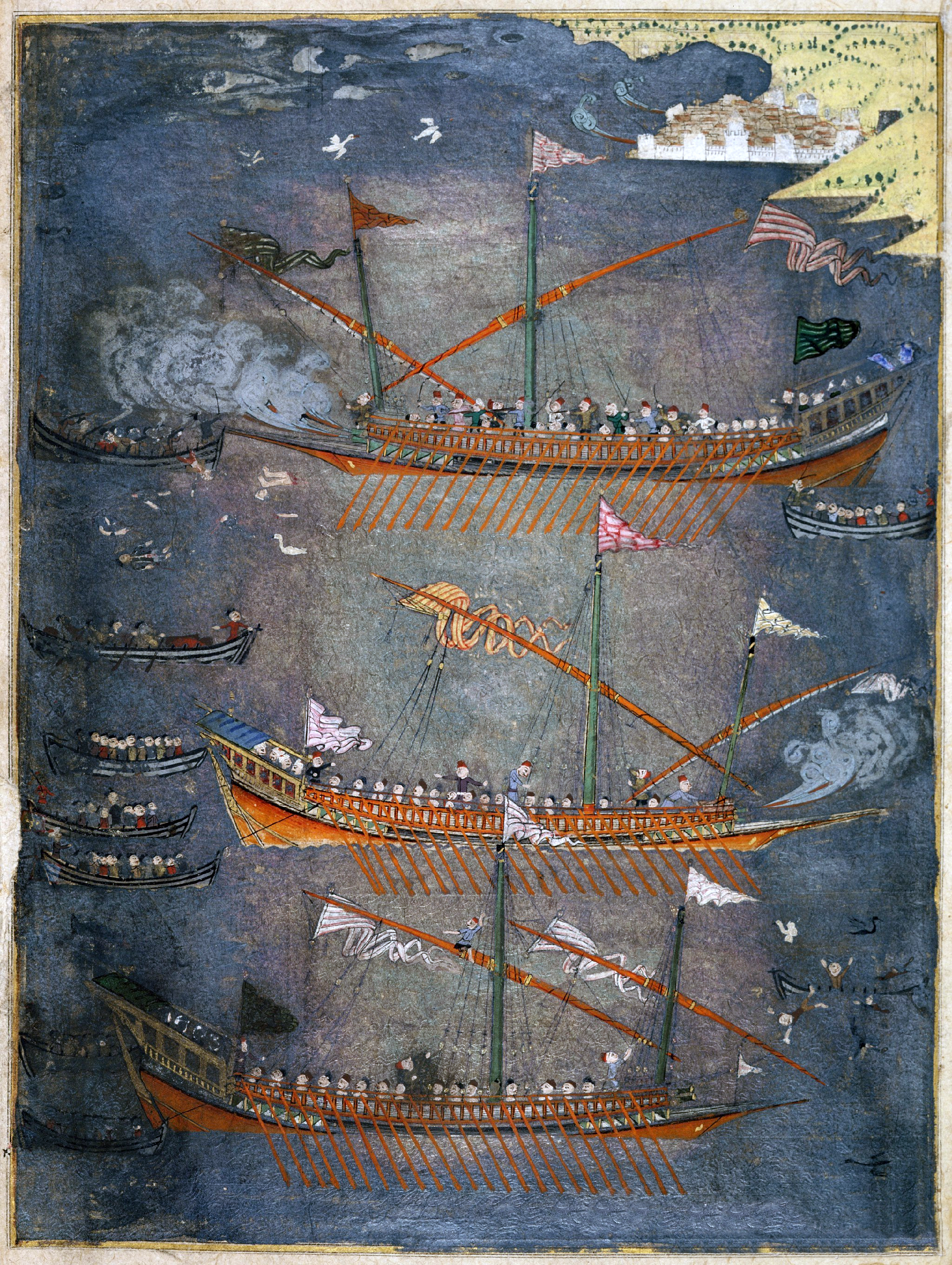
Turkish galleys, 17th century

A distant eyewitness, the famous Portuguese traveler Fernão Mendes Pinto later recounted how, passing by the fortress, Turkish galleys came close to seizing the tradeship he traveled in:

Having decided to stop for news of what was going on there, we began our approach to land, and by nightfall we were able to distinguish a lot of fires all along the coast as well as the occasional burst of artillery. Not knowing what to make of it, we shortened sail and hove to for the rest of the night until daybreak, when we got a clear view of the fortress surrounded by an enormous number of lateen-rigged vessels. [...] While we were arguing back and forth and becoming gradually more alarmed by the possibilities confronting us, five ships moved out from the middle of the fleet. They were huge galleys, with their fore-and-aft sails in a checkerboard pattern of green and purple, the deck awnings literally covered in flags, and long banners streaming so far down from the mastheads that the ends brushed the surface of the water.

— Fernão Mendes Pinto, in Peregrinação

The Ottoman artillery opened fire on the fortress on the 28th, as their galleys bombarded it from the sea, with the Portuguese replying in suit – the Portuguese sank a galley but lost several men as two of their basilisks exploded.

=== Attack on the Village of the Rumes' Redoubt ===
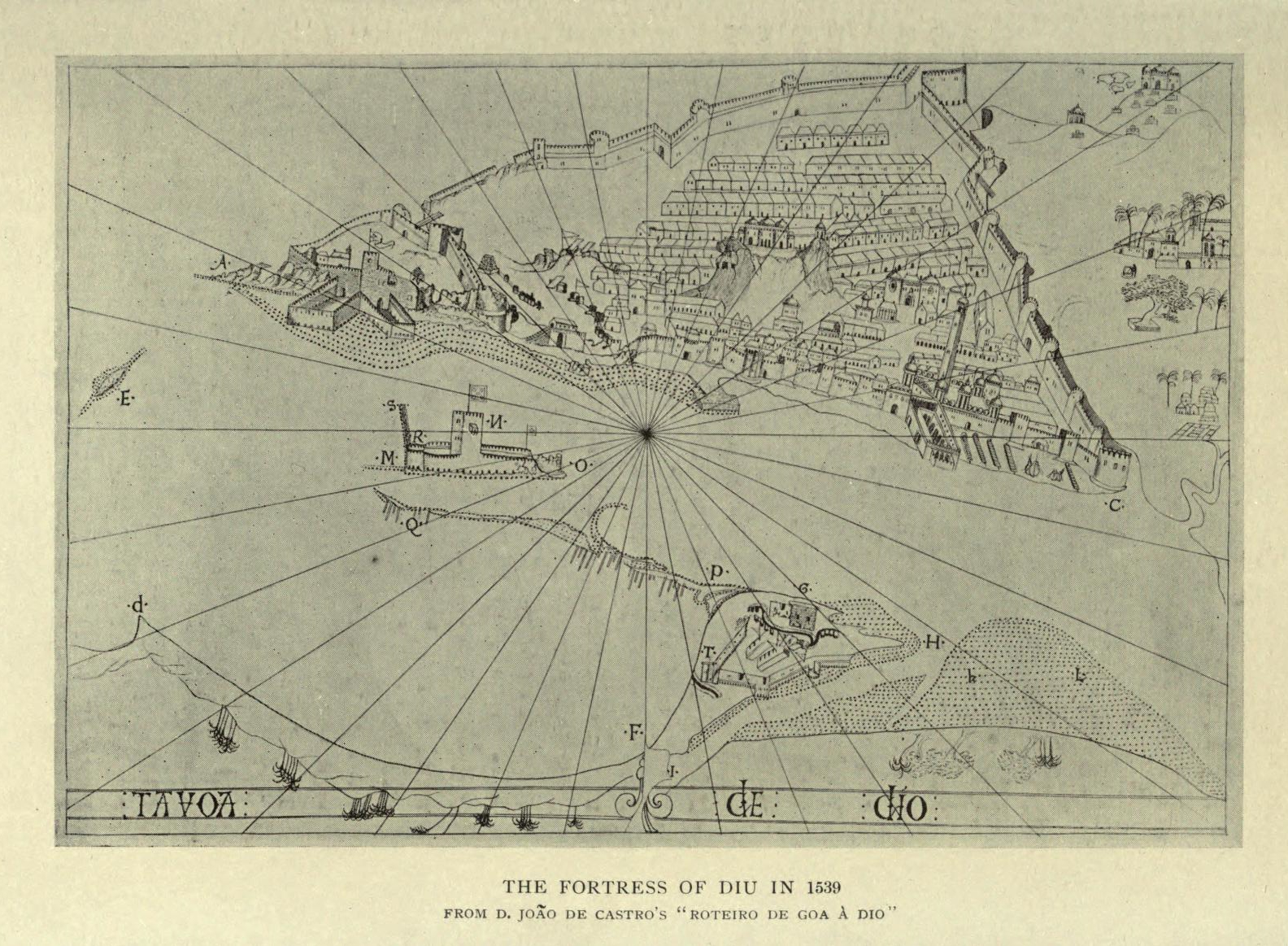
16th century Portuguese sketch of Diu by Dom João de Castro.

Across the Diu channel on the mainland shore, the Portuguese kept a redoubt by a village dubbed Vila dos Rumes – "Village of the Rumes" (Turks) modern day Gogolá – commanded by Captain Francisco Pacheco and defended by 30–40 Portuguese, which came under attack by Gujarati forces. On 10 September the army of Khadjar Safar bombarded the fortlet with Turkish artillery pieces before attempting to assault it with the aid of janissaries, but were repelled.

Khadjar Safar then ordered a craft be filled with timber, sulphur, and tar, which he hoped to place by the redoubt and smoke the Portuguese out. Realizing his intentions, António da Silveira sent Francisco de Gouveia with a small crew on a craft to burn the device with fire bombs under cover of night, despite coming under enemy fire. Another assault on 28 September with 700 janissaries failed after a prolonged bombardment.

The Portuguese garrison resisted until its captain Pacheco agreed to surrender to the Pasha on 1 October, who had granted them safe passage to the fortress unharmed. When they surrendered however, Suleiman promptly had them imprisoned on his galleys.

=== Francisco Pacheco's message ===
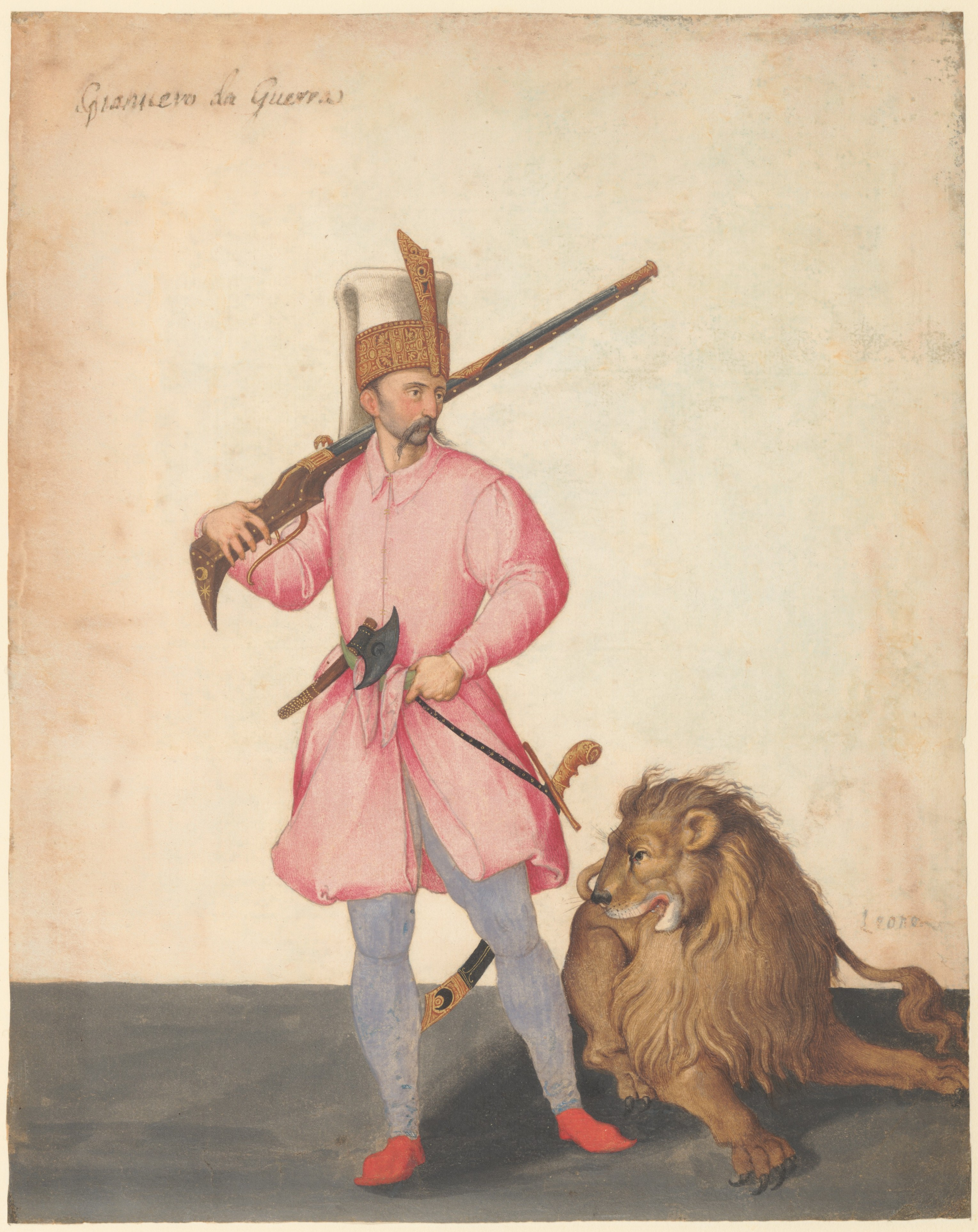
Janissary, c. 1577

Thus under the Pasha’s power, former captain Francisco Pacheco wrote a letter to captain António da Silveira, advising him to lay down arms; it was delivered by a Portuguese renegade António Faleyro, who had converted to Islam and dressed in the Turkish fashion, that he was at first unrecognizable by his former comrades. It read:

I have surrendered to the great captain Çoleymam baxá through an agreement sealed in gold under his name, in which he granted us our lives, liberties, belongings and slaves, old and young, except the weapons and artillery: and had us go greet him on his galley, and as we were led to the city, they divided us by the houses, in groups of two: me and Gonçalo D'Almeida my cousin, and António Faleyro were taken to Suleiman's bastard galley, who received us well and gave each of us fine clothes; after which I told him to spare me such procedure of his and release us (as had been promised) and he responded that we ought not to wear ourselves out, for he had fulfilled his part. But as he wanted to attack that fortress by land and sea, he'd entertain us as long as that took; and upon capturing it, he'd send us to India; otherwise he'd release us, so we might return to the fortress. Then he ordered two very sound basilisks unloaded, and he'll unload as many as he wishes, which he can very well do. And allow me to write to you to surrender without further delay, otherwise he'll have you all by the sword. Now see what you must and be well advised

Captain António da Silveira, who considered the Pasha's conduct to have been treasonous (and Pacheco’s advice outrageous), seized paper and ink and replied in the following manner:

For such a great and powerful Captain as you claim he is, he ought to better keep his charters, and yet I'm not as surprised by his lack of truth, which they are born with, as by your writing; be well advised, tell him to do as much as he can, for over the smallest stone of this fortress we shall all perish. Be warned not to bring me nor send me more of such messages, for as enemies I shall have the bombards fire upon you.

The writer Gaspar Correia provided a different account of the exchange, however it is not in accordance with that of the veteran Lopo de Sousa Coutinho, who personally participated in the siege.

=== Assault on the fortress ===
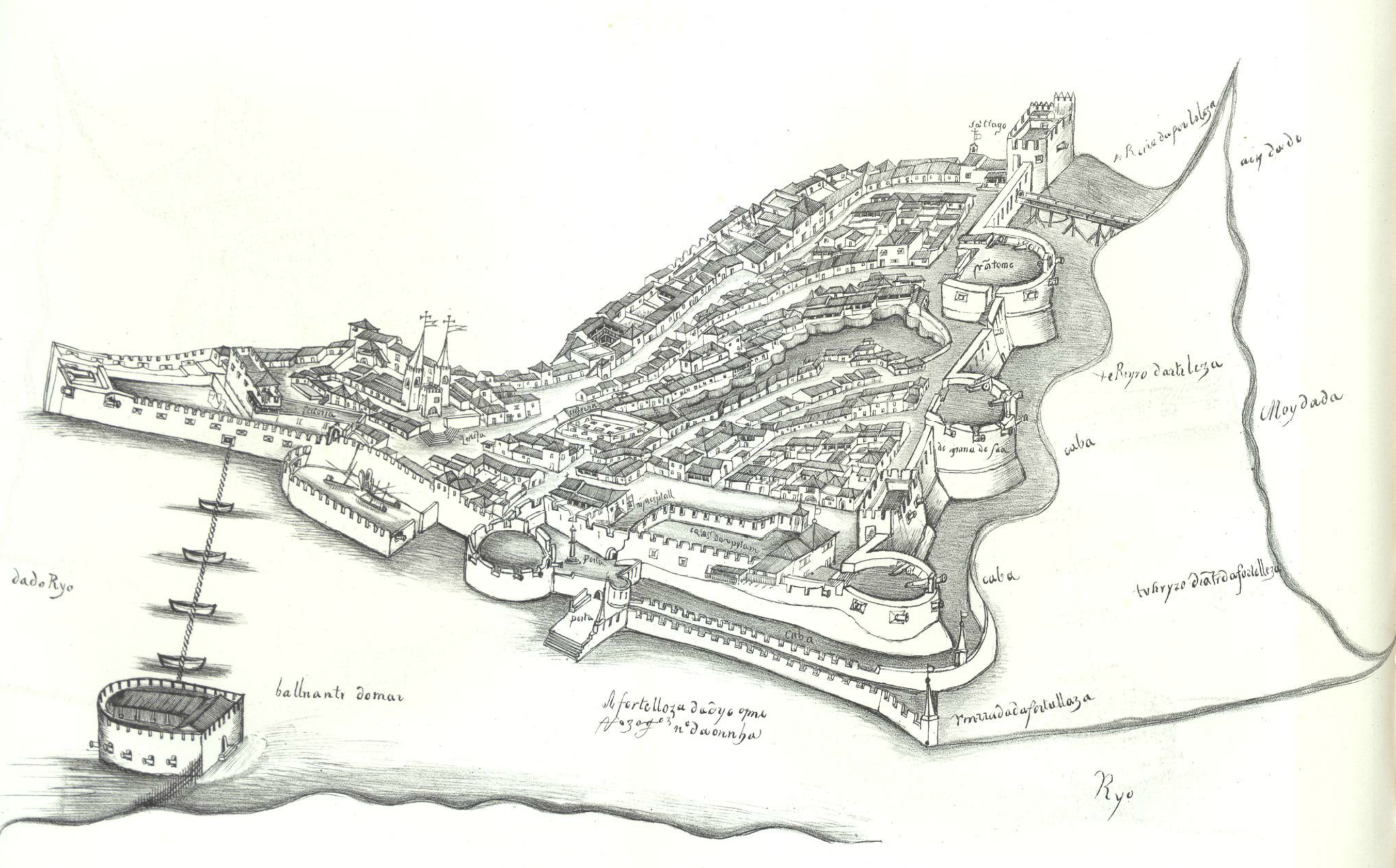
The Portuguese fortress of Diu as sketched by Gaspar Correia.

By 5 October the Turks had finished their siege works and assembled all their artillery, which included nine basilisks, five great bombards, fifteen heavy guns, and 80 medium and smaller cannon that bombarded the fortress for the following 27 days. That night, 5 more craft from Goa with gunpowder and reinforcements arrived. After seven days of bombardment, part of the bulwark of Gaspar de Sousa collapsed and the Turks attempted to scale it "with two banners", but were repelled with heavy losses to bombs and arquebus fire. Another assault the following morning was met with equally fierce resistance by the Portuguese. Afterwards, the Turks forced labourers into the moat to undermine the fortress' walls and, in spite of several losses, managed to open a breach with gunpowder, but already the Portuguese had raised a barricade around the breach from the inside, which caused many losses on the assailants once they attempted to break through. When at night the bombardment ceased, the Portuguese repaired the fortress' walls under the cover of darkness.

On the 17th of October, eyewitness and officer Lopo de Sousa Coutinho was wounded while on guard duty and forced to a sickbed, and afterwards could only compile an account of the siege based on what he heard.

Portuguese naval and military banner featuring the Cross of the Order of Christ.

From an artillery battery on the opposite shore, the Turks bombarded the "Sea Fort" (Baluarte do Mar) that stood in the middle of the river mouth bombarding the flank of Muslim positions. On 27 October Suleiman Pasha ordered 6 small galleys to attempt to scale the fortlet, but came under heavy Portuguese cannon fire. The following day, the Turks drew 12 galleys and again attempted to "board" the fortlet, but were repelled with heavy losses due to fire bombs.

Scurvy broke out inside the fort, causing great privation and death.

On 30 October Pasha Suleiman attempted a final ruse by faking the withdrawal of his forces. He embarked 1,000 men but ever cautious, António da Silveira ordered the sentries to be alert – at daybreak, 14,000 men divided in three "banners" attempted to scale the fortress as it was bombarded with no regard to friendly fire. A few hundred troops managed to scale the walls and raise banners but the Portuguese managed to repel the assailants, killing 500 and wounding a further 1,000 from gunfire and bombs out of the São Tomé bastion. One João Rodrigues threw a barrel of gunpowder over the walls with a lit fuse attached, which killed over 100 men upon exploding.

At the end of that day no more than 40 able-bodied Portuguese remained, the gunpowder was nearly exhausted and the forts walls were thoroughly shattered. Yet, the Pasha was unaware of the exact condition of the defenders.

With his relation with Coja Safar and the Gujaratis degrading and increasingly fearful of being caught off-hand by the Viceroy's armada, on 1 November Suleiman finally decided to abandon the siege and began re-embarking his troops. Suspecting another ruse from the Pasha, Captain Silveira ordered 20 of his last men on a sortie to deceive the enemy of their dwindling forces. The party managed to capture a Turkish banner. The Pasha however truly intended on departing on 5 November, but was unable due to unfavourable weather. That night, two small galleys reached Diu with reinforcements and supplies, firing their guns and signal rockets.

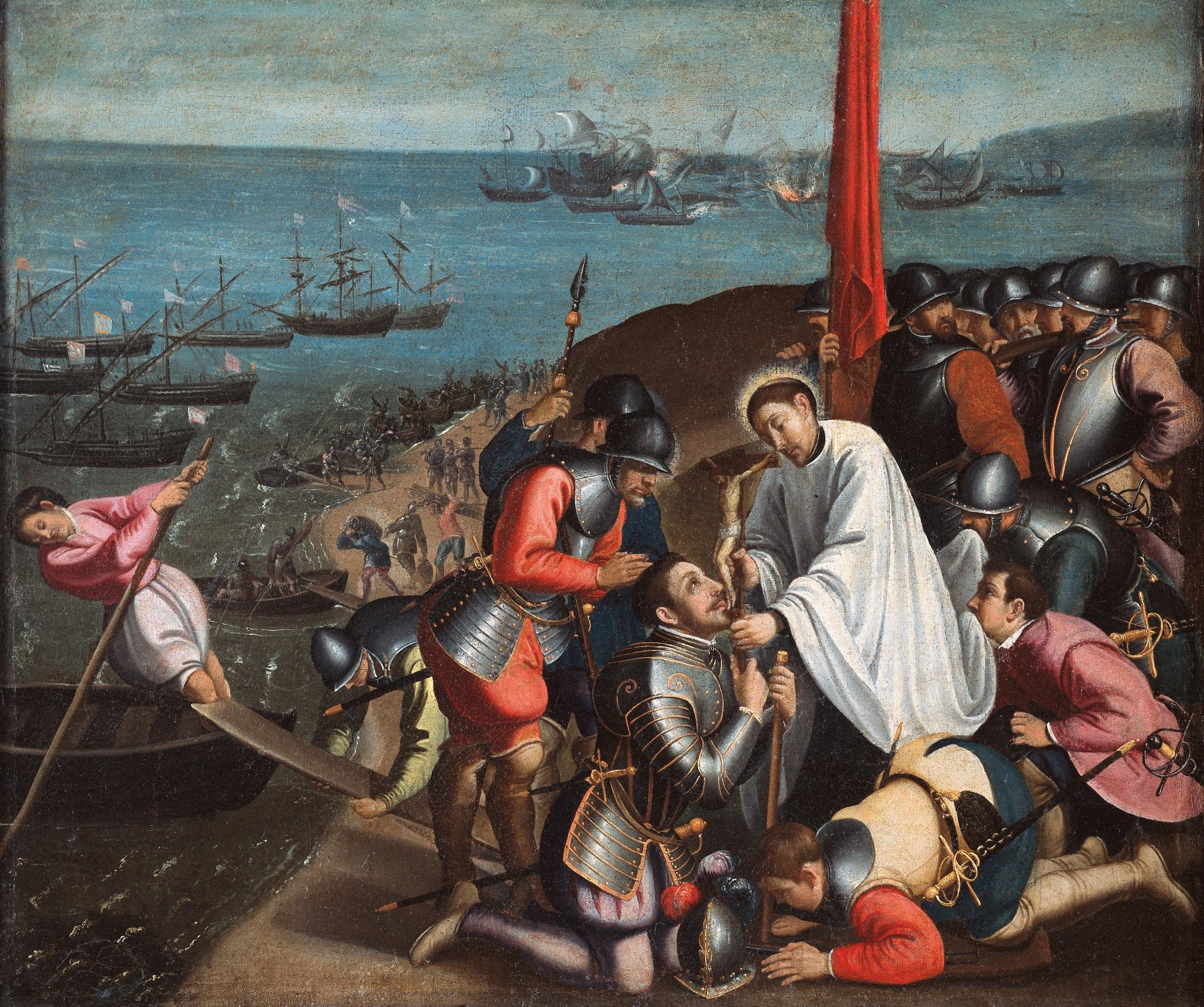
Portuguese soldiers, 1619. Painting by André Reinoso

The following morning, a fleet of 24 small galleys was sighted and believing it to be the vanguard of the governor's rescue fleet, the Pasha hurriedly departed, leaving 1,200 dead and 500 wounded behind. Khadjar Safar then set fire to his encampment and abandoned the island with his forces shortly after. In reality, it was just a forward fleet under the command of António da Silva Meneses and Dom Luís de Ataíde, dispatched from Goa with reinforcements, supplies, and news that the governor would depart soon to their aid. Although they took no part in the fighting, the small force was triumphantly received within the ruined fortress by its last survivors. The Portuguese were by then critically low on gunpowder and supplies and with less than 40 valid men; in the final stages of the siege, the Portuguese record that even the women assisted in its defence. Catarina Lopes and Isabel Madeira are examples of two female captains who actively participated during the siege, they led a squad of female soldiers. Dona Isabel da Veiga, wife of Manuel de Vasconcelos and Ana Fernandes, wife of a physician, took some duties upon themselves to allow more soldiers to man the bulwarks, while also encouraging them and even being present at assaults. Ana "used to go round the fortress and the walls... telling each one how great was his obligation to be brave both to defend his life and to win honour. She did not take refuge in her house from firing" but carried the dead and wounded.

== Goa ==
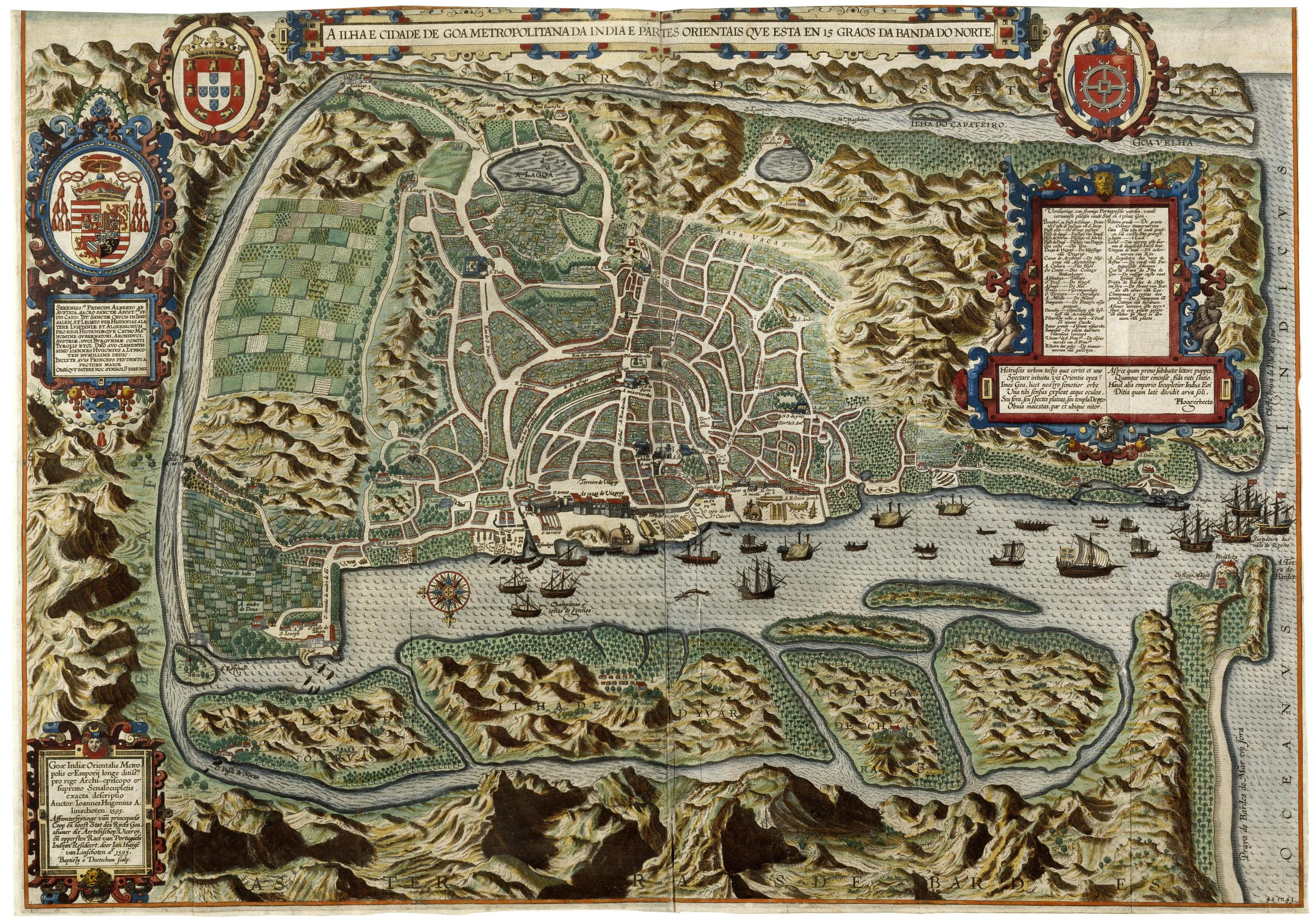
Goa, head of all Portuguese possessions in the East

The craft sent by António da Silveira arrived in Goa in mid-September, but already governor Nuno da Cunha was well aware of the presence of the Turks in India: the Portuguese had intercepted a Turkish galleon in southern India and another galley that got separated from the fleet and called at Honavar, which the Portuguese destroyed with the aid of the locals (a fight in which Fernão Mendes Pinto participated). The governor had assembled a relief force of 14 galleons, 8 galleys, several caravels, and over 30 smaller oar ships, but on 14 September the new viceroy appointed by Lisbon arrived, and demanded the immediate succession in office.

By the end of 1537, reports on Ottoman preparations in Egypt had reached Lisbon through Venice, and King John III promptly ordered a reinforcement of 11 naus and 3,000 soldiers, of which 800 were fidalgos, to be dispatched to India as soon as possible along with the new viceroy, Dom Garcia de Noronha. At Goa however, Dom Garcia considered the relief force organized by governor Nuno da Cunha to be insufficient, though the Portuguese veterans in India argued otherwise. The viceroy remained in Goa for two more months, organizing his forces until he had gathered an imposing fleet, which according to João de Barros numbered 170 sail and 4,500 Portuguese soldiers, and according to a detailed report by Francisco de Andrade, was composed of 152 vessels, which included 9 heavy carracks, 14 galleons, 13 small carracks, 8 war-caravels, 5 latin caravels, 1 bastard galley, 13 royal galleys, 15 galleots, 11 Mediterranean brigantines, 2 albetoças, 18 light galleys and 44 light vessels and oarcraft, bearing 5,000 Portuguese soldiers, 3,000 Indian auxiliaries, 1,500 Portuguese sailors, uncounted number of native sailors, oarsmen and combat slaves and a little under 400 heavy cannon and 600 light cannon. Just as the expedition was about to set sail to Diu however, a craft arrived in Goa with the information that the siege had been lifted.

The Portuguese learnt from Turkish prisoners of war or Christian captives who managed to flee from the Ottoman fleet that Suleiman Pasha had ordered his captains to link his galleys together side-by-side with their stern to land and cannons out to the sea in case they were attacked by the Portuguese relief fleet before they had managed to withdraw, a tactic similar to the one employed by the Mamluk fleet which was annihilated at the Battle of Diu in 1509.

== Aftermath ==
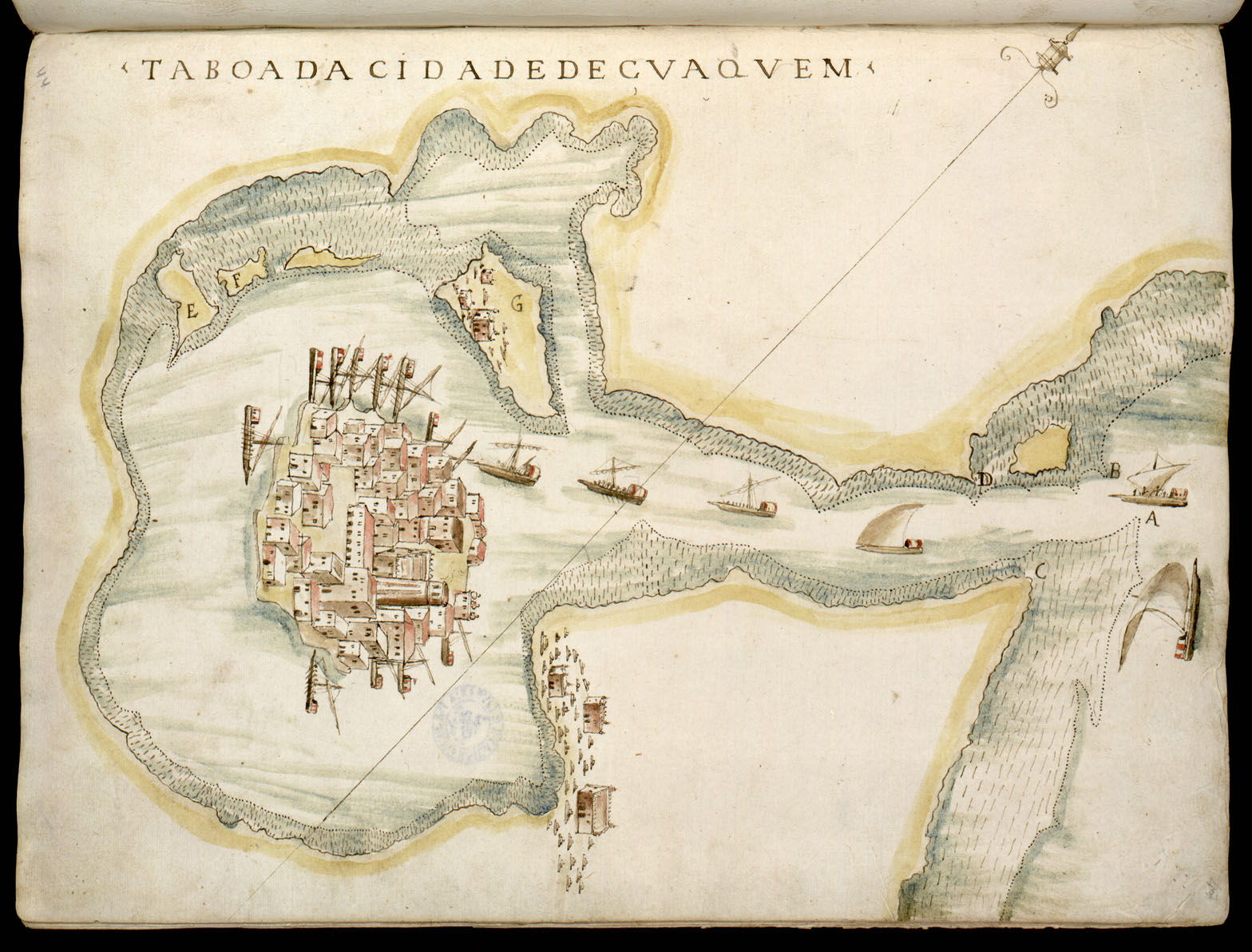
Portuguese attack on Suakin in 1541.

The defeat of the combined Turkish and Gujarati forces at Diu represented a critical setback in Ottoman plans for expanding their influence into the Indian Ocean. Without a suitable base or allies, failure at Diu meant the Ottomans were unable to proceed with their campaign in India, leaving the Portuguese uncontested in the western Indian coast. Never again would the Ottoman Turks ever send so large an armada to India.

After the failed siege, the Ottomans returned to Aden, where they fortified the city with 100 pieces of artillery. One of them is still visible today at the Tower of London, following the capture of Aden by British forces in 1839. Suleiman Pasha also established Ottoman suzerainty over Shihr and Zabid, and reorganized the territories of Yemen and Aden as an Ottoman province, or Beylerbeylik.

The veteran Lopo de Sousa Coutinho later recounted that "it was said" that the Portuguese who had surrendered to Suleiman Pasha were all killed off in the Red Sea, on their way back to Egypt. Indeed, at As-Salif, by Kamaran Island, the Pasha had all prisoners under his control massacred, 140 in total, and their heads put on display in Cairo.

Suleiman Pasha left behind a number of very heavy cannon that could not be quickly moved, called "Sulaimani guns" by Persian authors. Several were salvaged by the governor of Junagadh Mujahid Khan Bahlim, and moved to that city. Many were broken up in the following centuries, but two survived in Junagadh, one of which stands in front of a mosque in Uparkot and bears an inscription which reads:

This cannon was ordered to be made in Egypt in the cause of God in 937 H by Sultan Sulaiman, son of Salim Khan, the king of Arabia and Ajam, may he be victorious, in order to subdue the enemies of the state and of the faith, the cursed Portuguese, the infidels who wish to enter India. It is cast by Muhammad, son of Hamza.

Suleiman Pasha intended to launch a second expedition against the Portuguese in Diu, but this did not happen.

Turkish and Indian historians pass over the 1538 siege in very summary ways and attributed its outcome to the failure of the Gujaratis to provide the Turks with adequate supplies. Firishta and Sikandar, author of the Mirat-i-Sikandari, a history dedicated to Gujarat, both omitted the failed siege on Diu in their works, just as they similarly omitted the great Portuguese victory at Diu in 1509 against a combined Gujarati, Egyptian and Malabar fleet, though they mentioned the much smaller Battle of Chaul of 1508 where the Portuguese were defeated.

In 1540, the Portuguese sent a retaliatory expedition to Suez with a fleet of 72 ships, sacking Suakin, Kusayr, and spreading panic in Egypt. In 1546, the Ottoman established a new naval base in Basra, thus threatening the Portuguese in Hormuz. The Ottomans would suffer a strong naval defeat against the Portuguese in the Persian Gulf in 1554 at the Battle of the Gulf of Oman. Further conflict between the Ottomans and the Portuguese would lead to the Ottoman embassy to Aceh in 1565.

The siege of Diu was one of the most significant achievements of the Portuguese in the East. The Portuguese ability to maintain a naval supply line open ensured the capacity to resist the siege. In March 1539, peace was signed with Gujarat. Portugal would remain in possession of the Diu enclave until Operation Vijay in 1961.

== Gallery ==
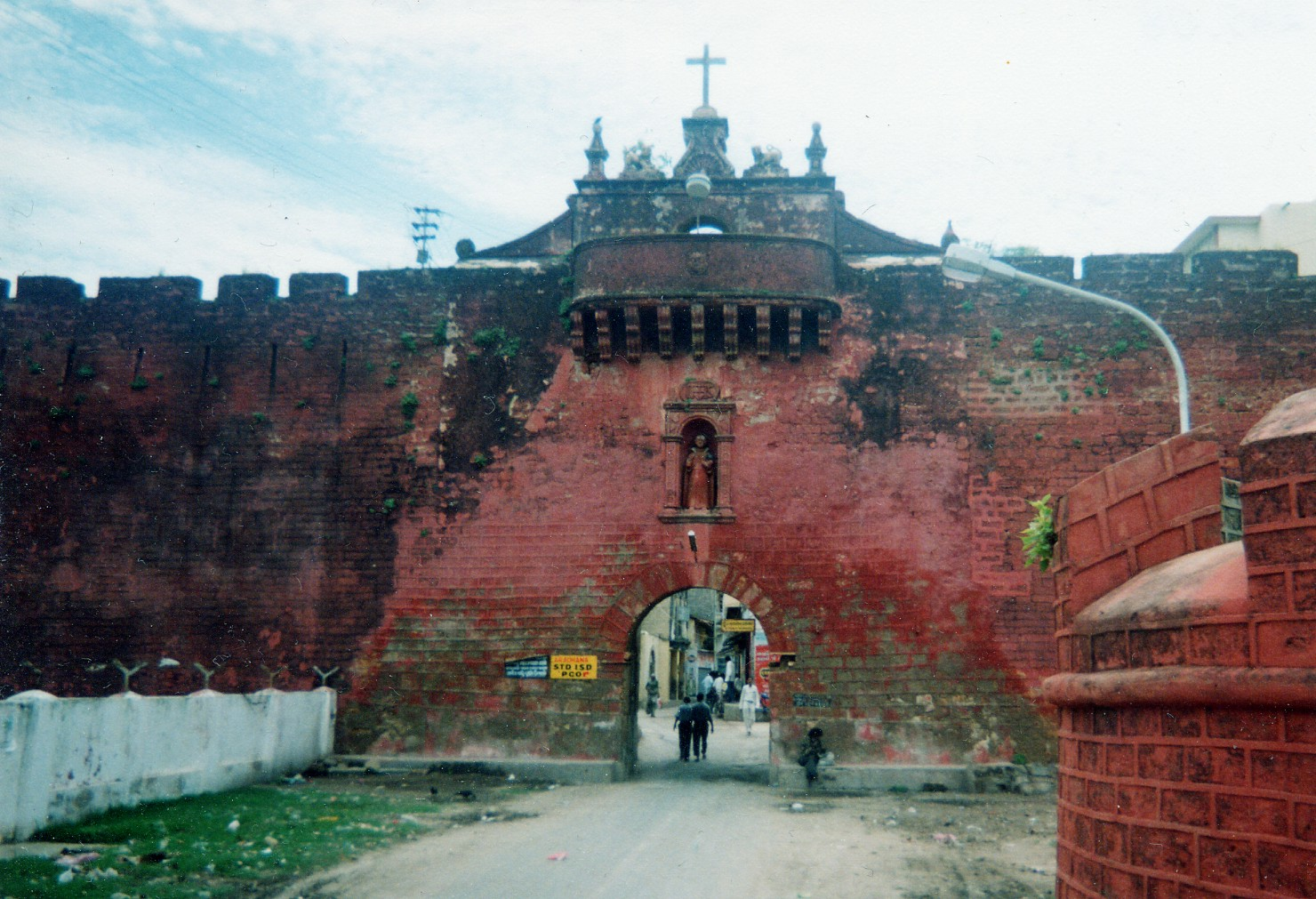
The gateway of the outer walls of Diu.

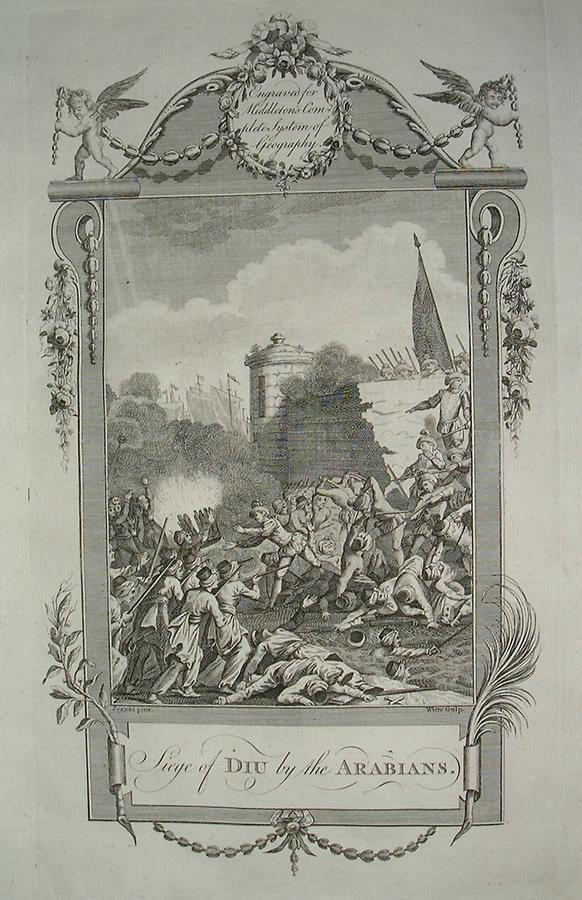
The siege of Diu by the "Arabians"

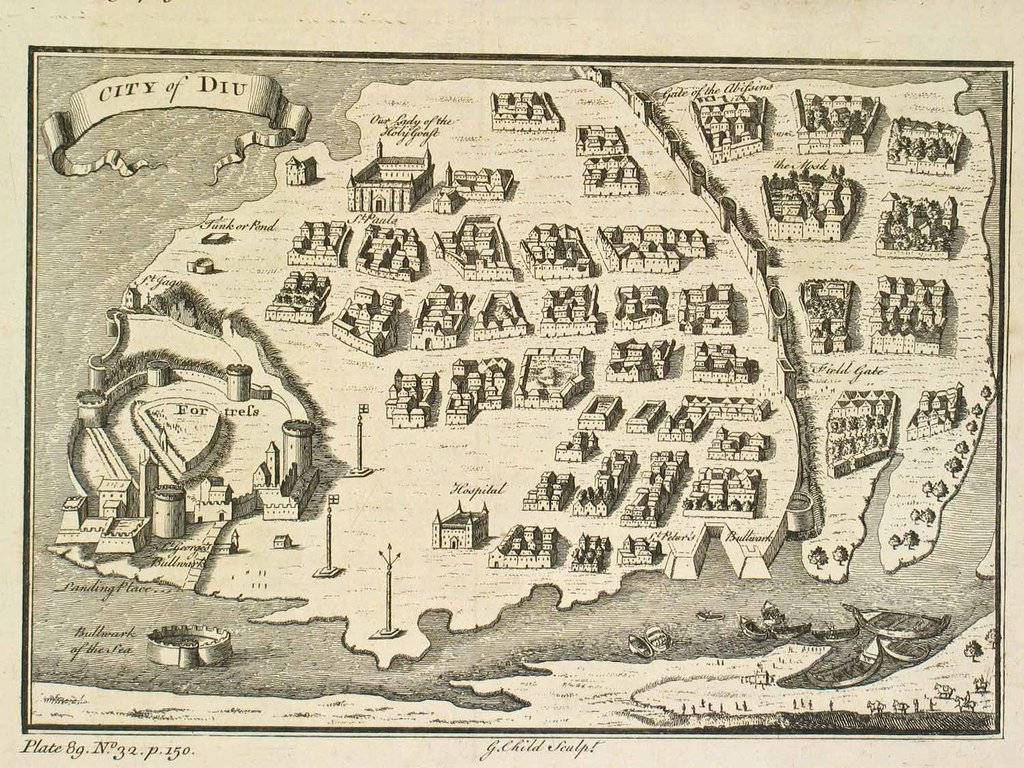
Map of Diu, 1729.

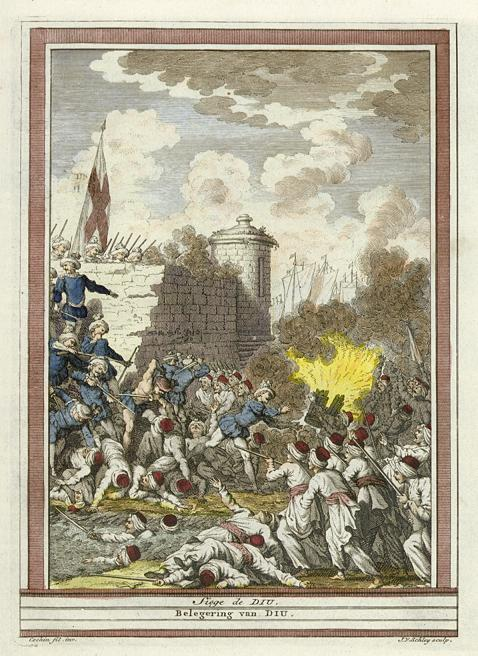
An 18th-century depiction of the siege of Diu

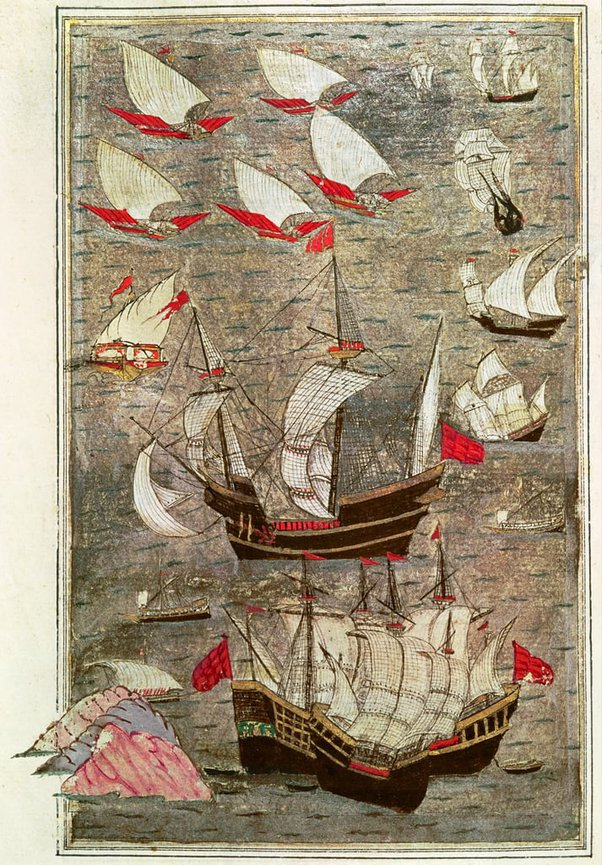
Ottoman fleet in the Indian Ocean in the 16th century

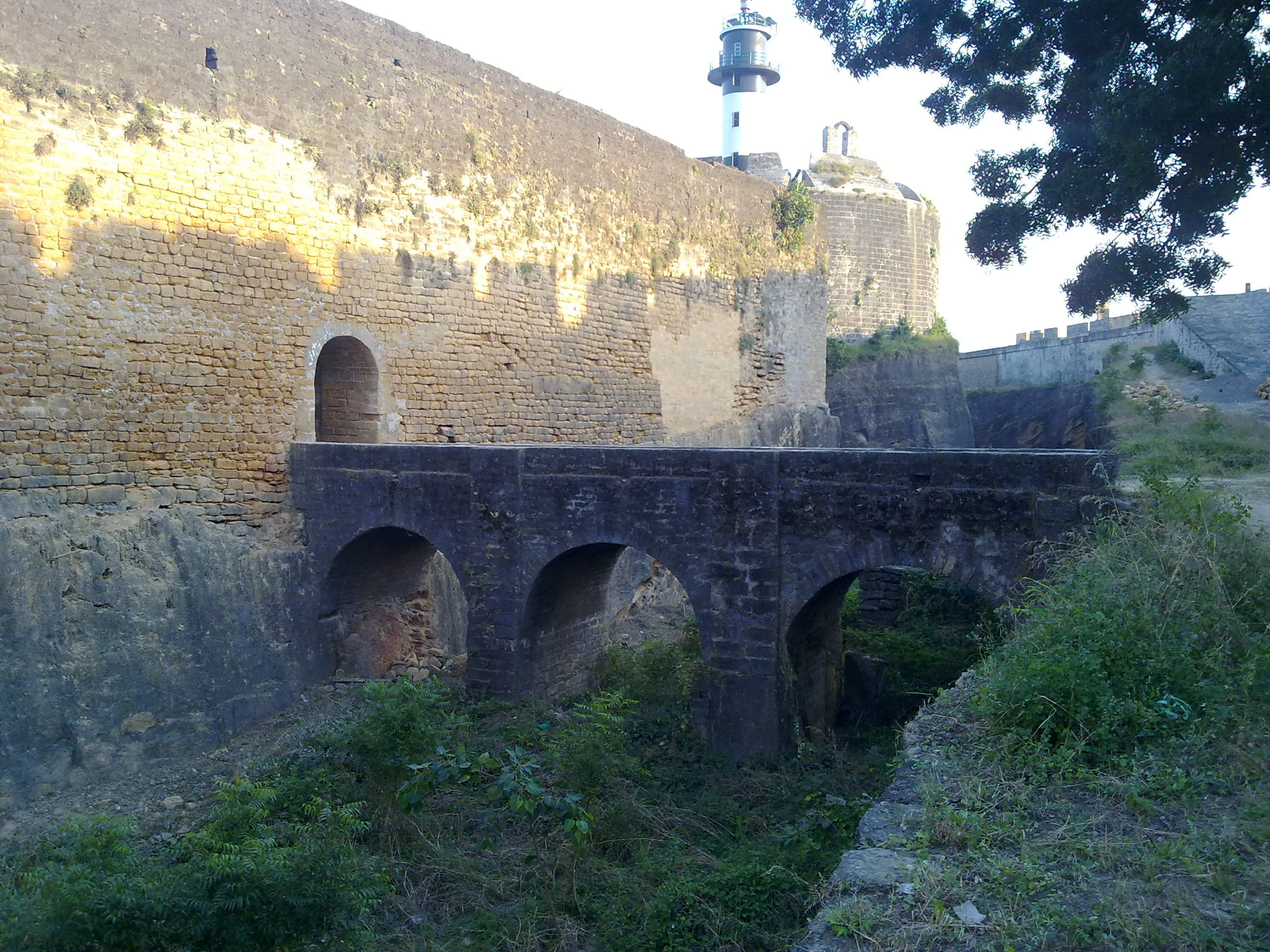
Original inner wall and moat

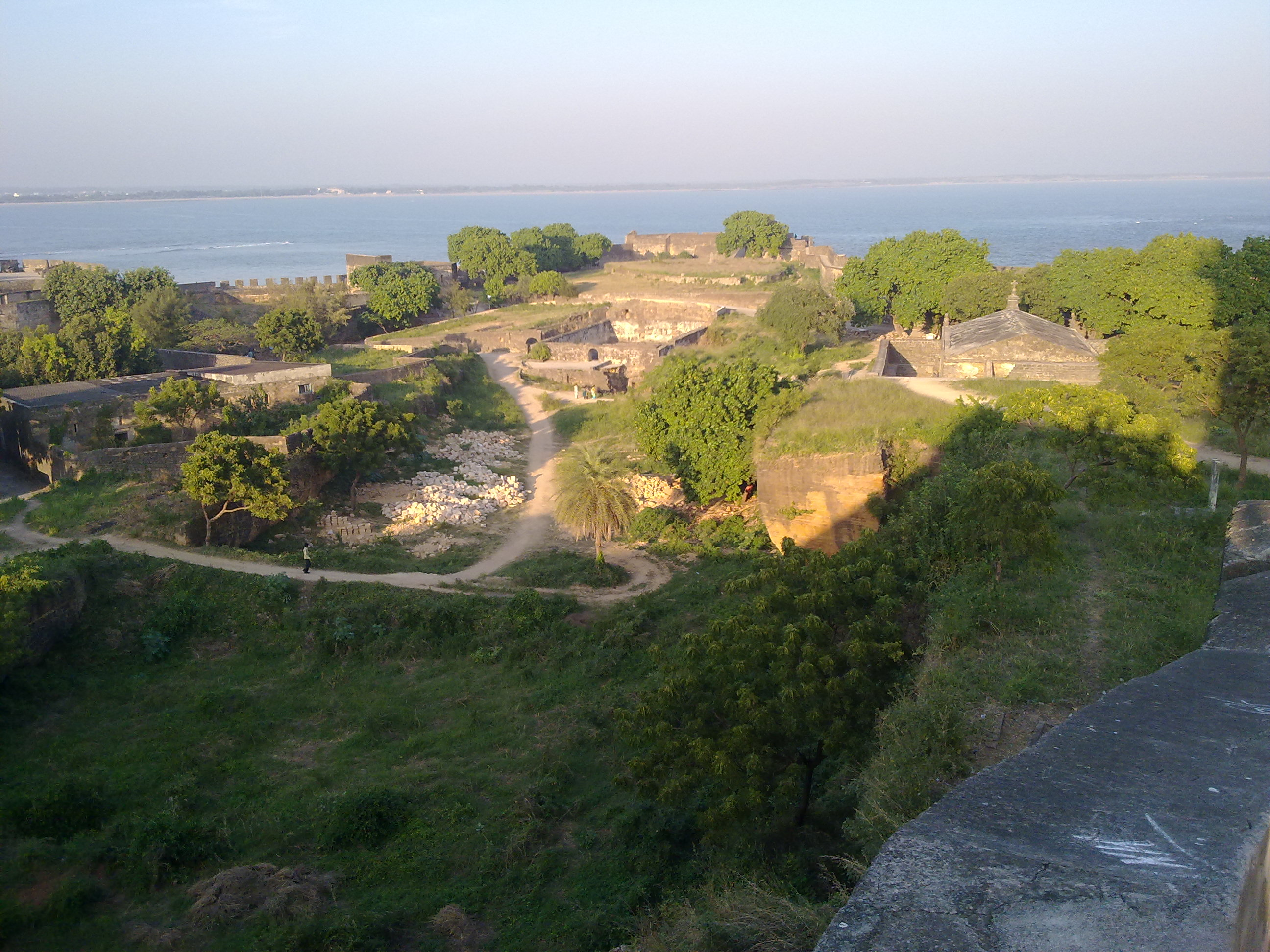
View within the walls

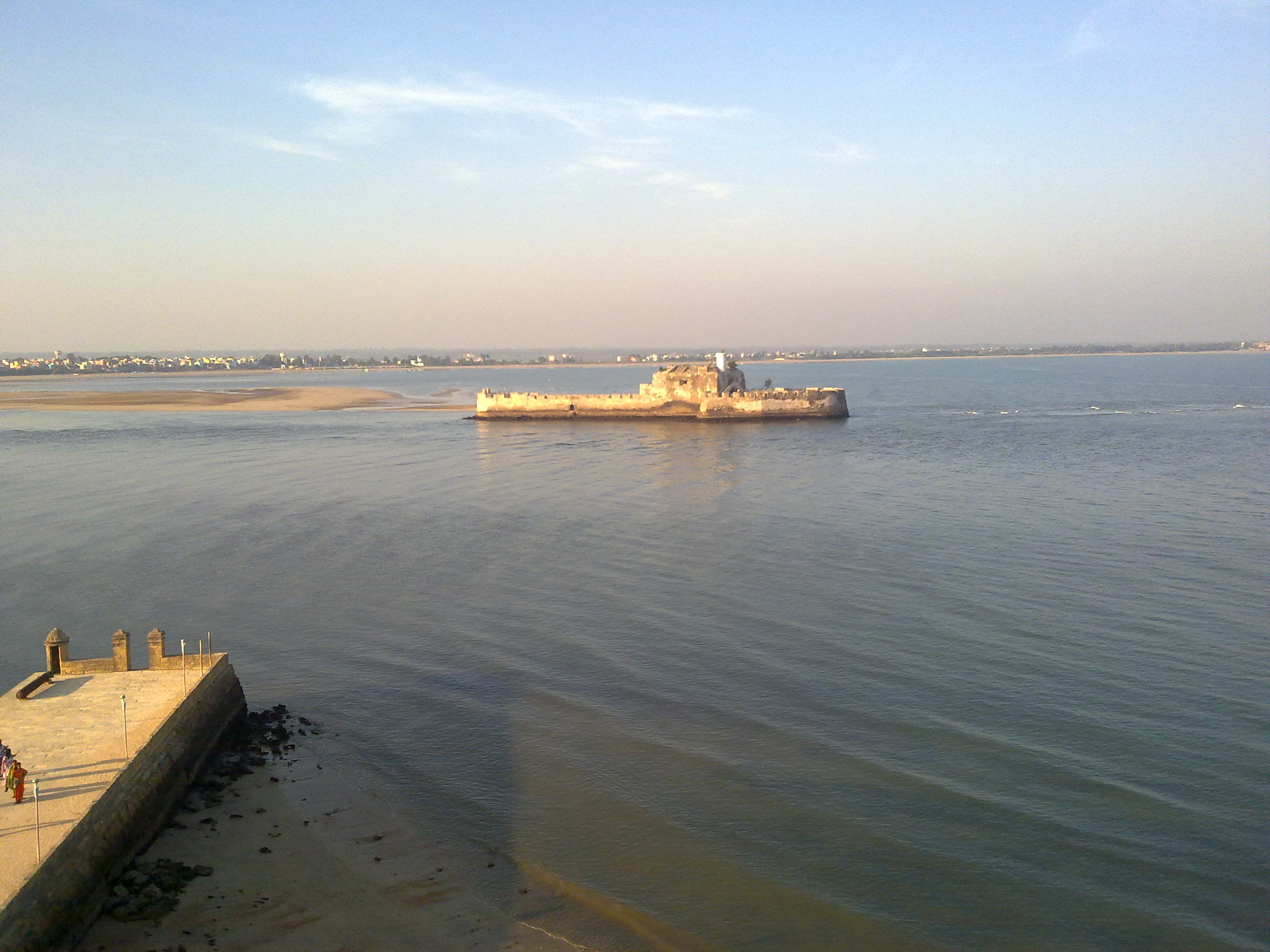
Sea Fort, nowadays known as Panikota, as seen from the citadel

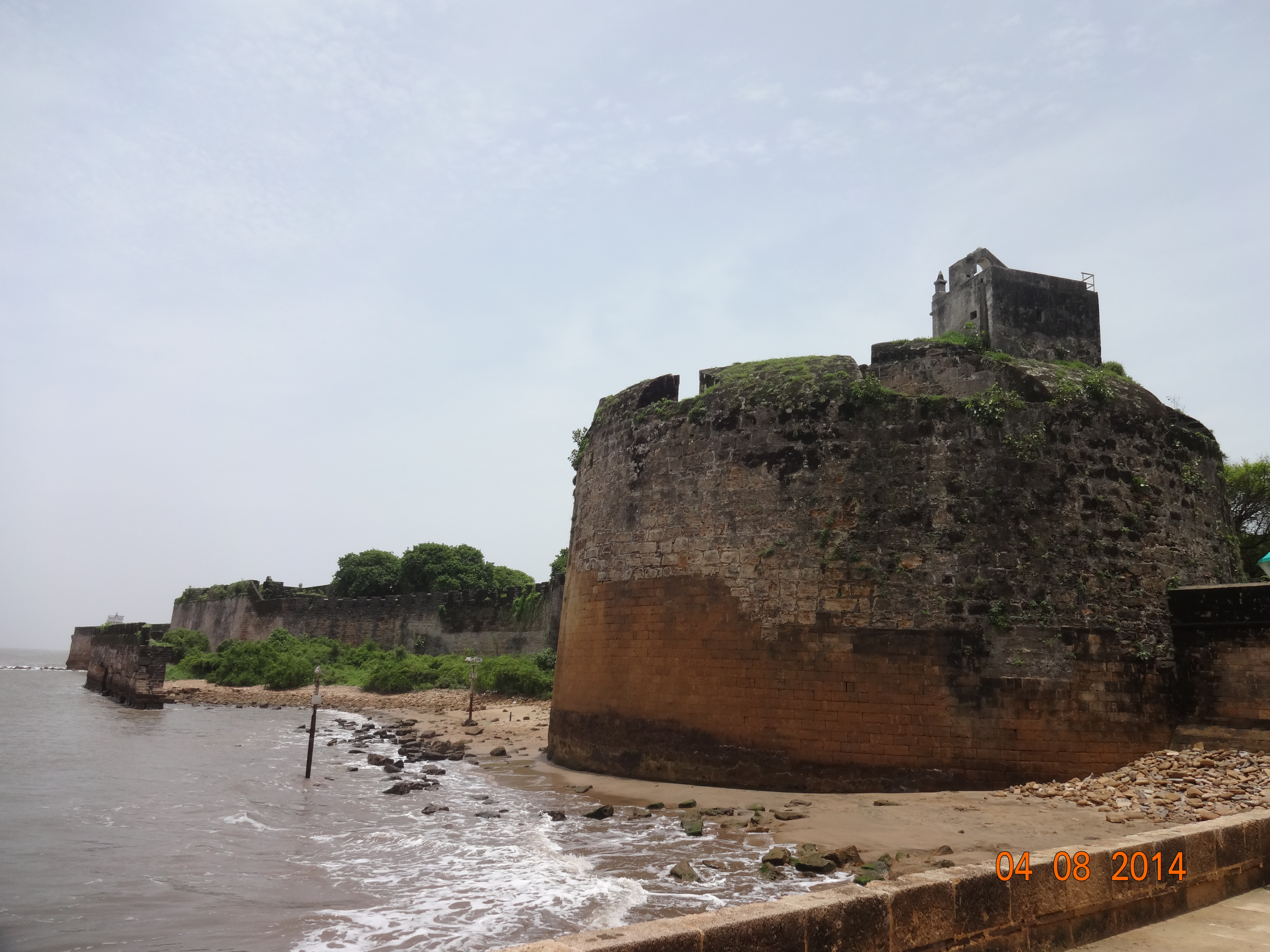
São Jorge bastion

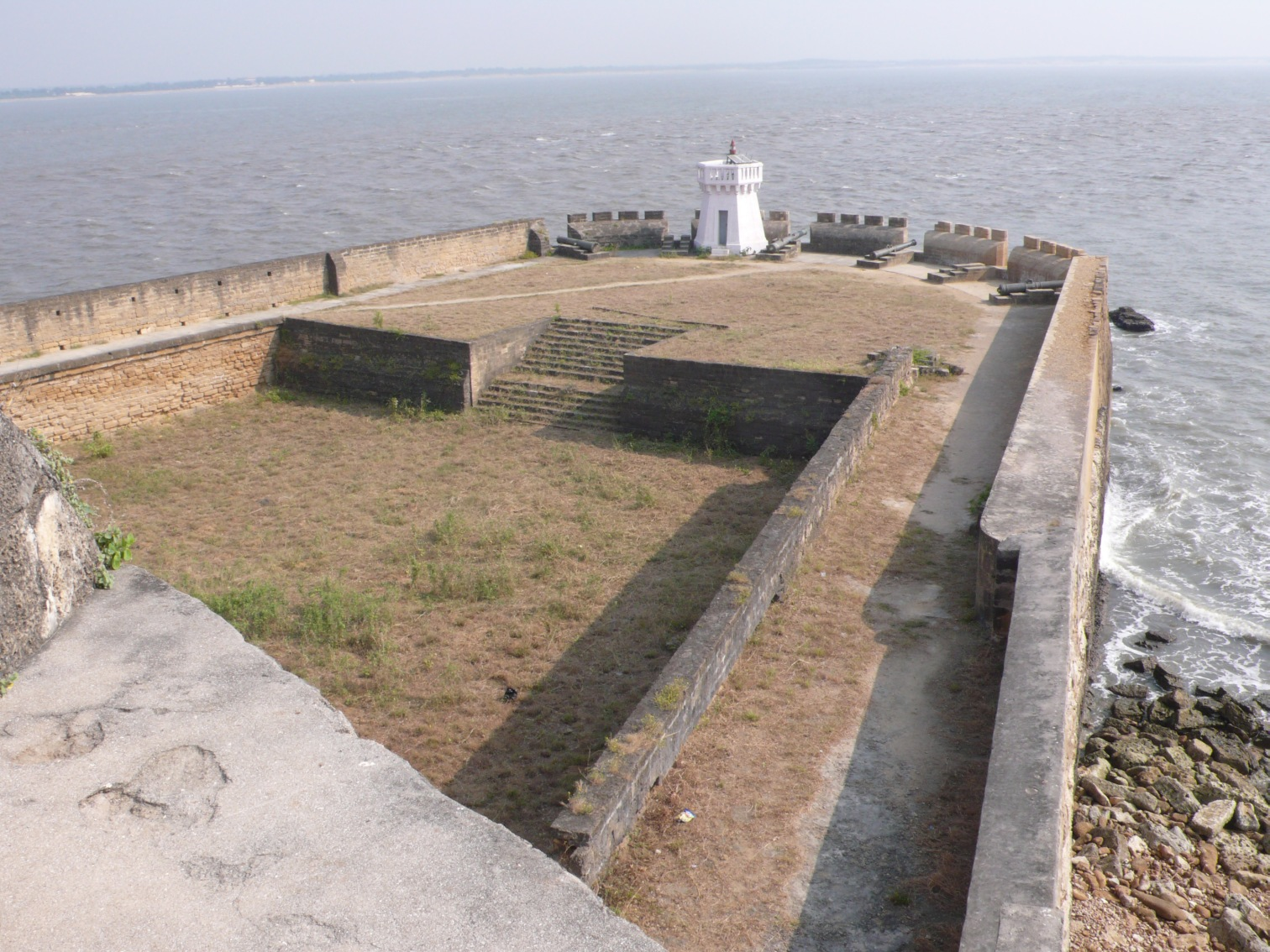
Sea wall

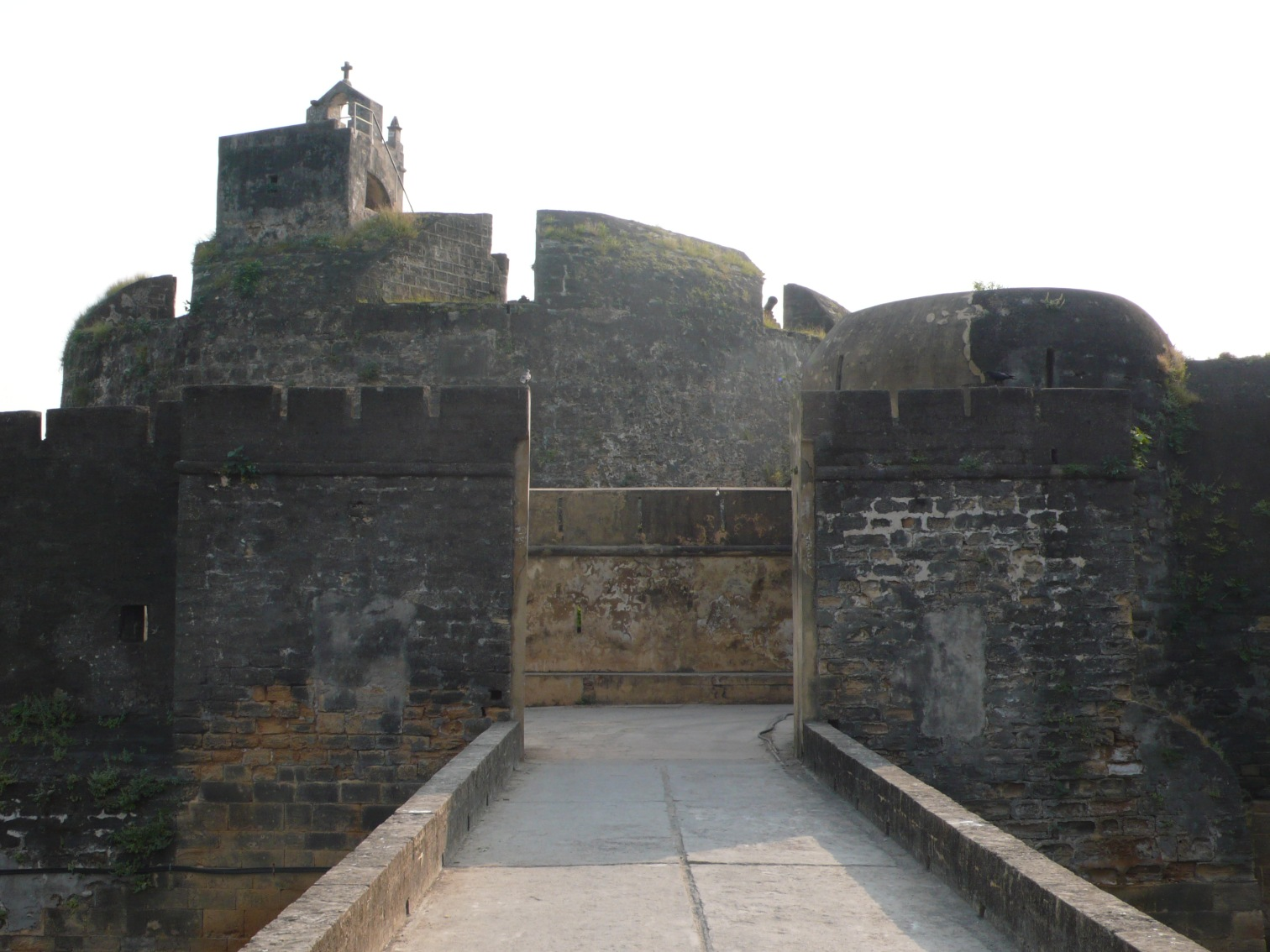
Gate

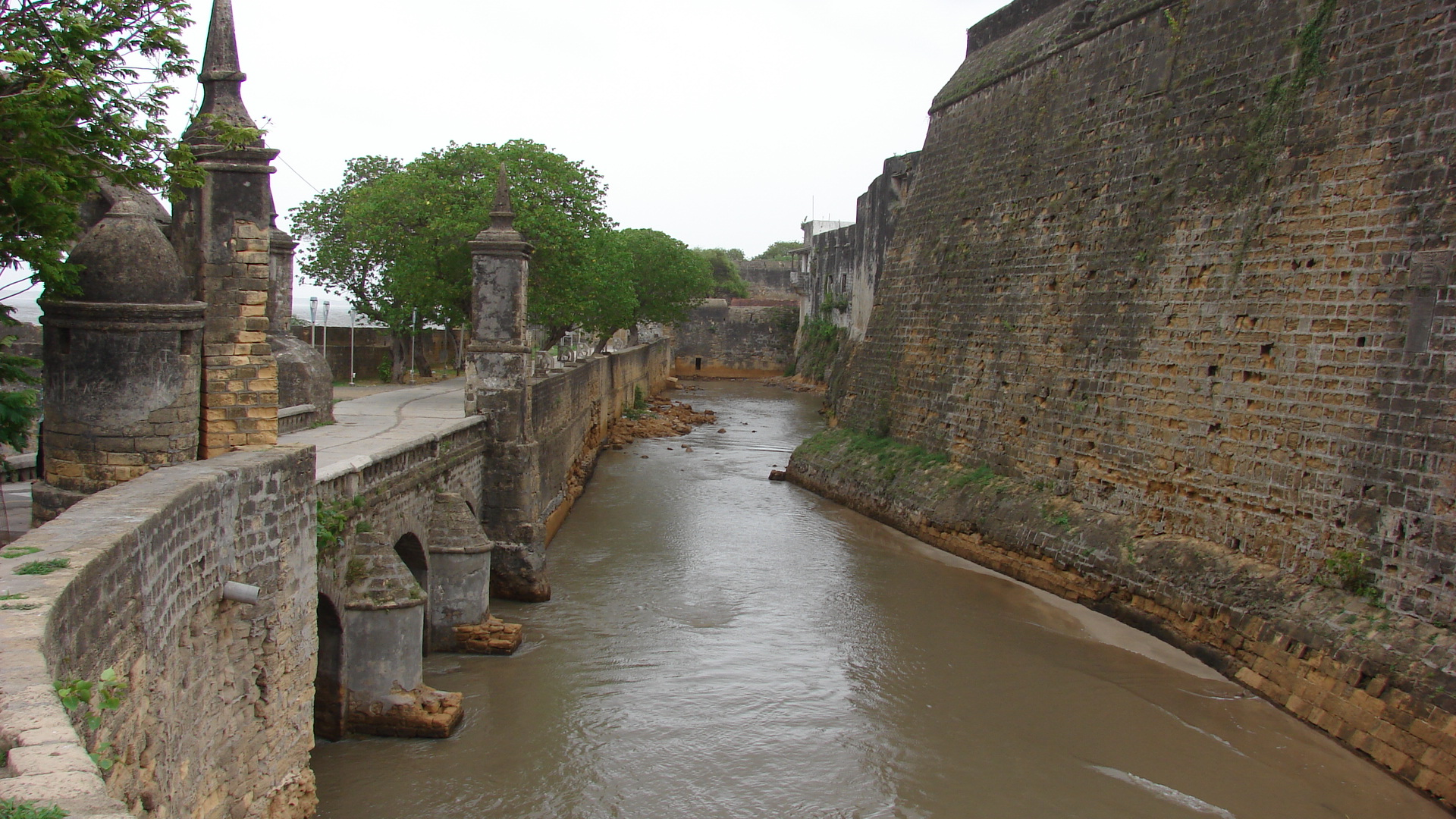
Moat

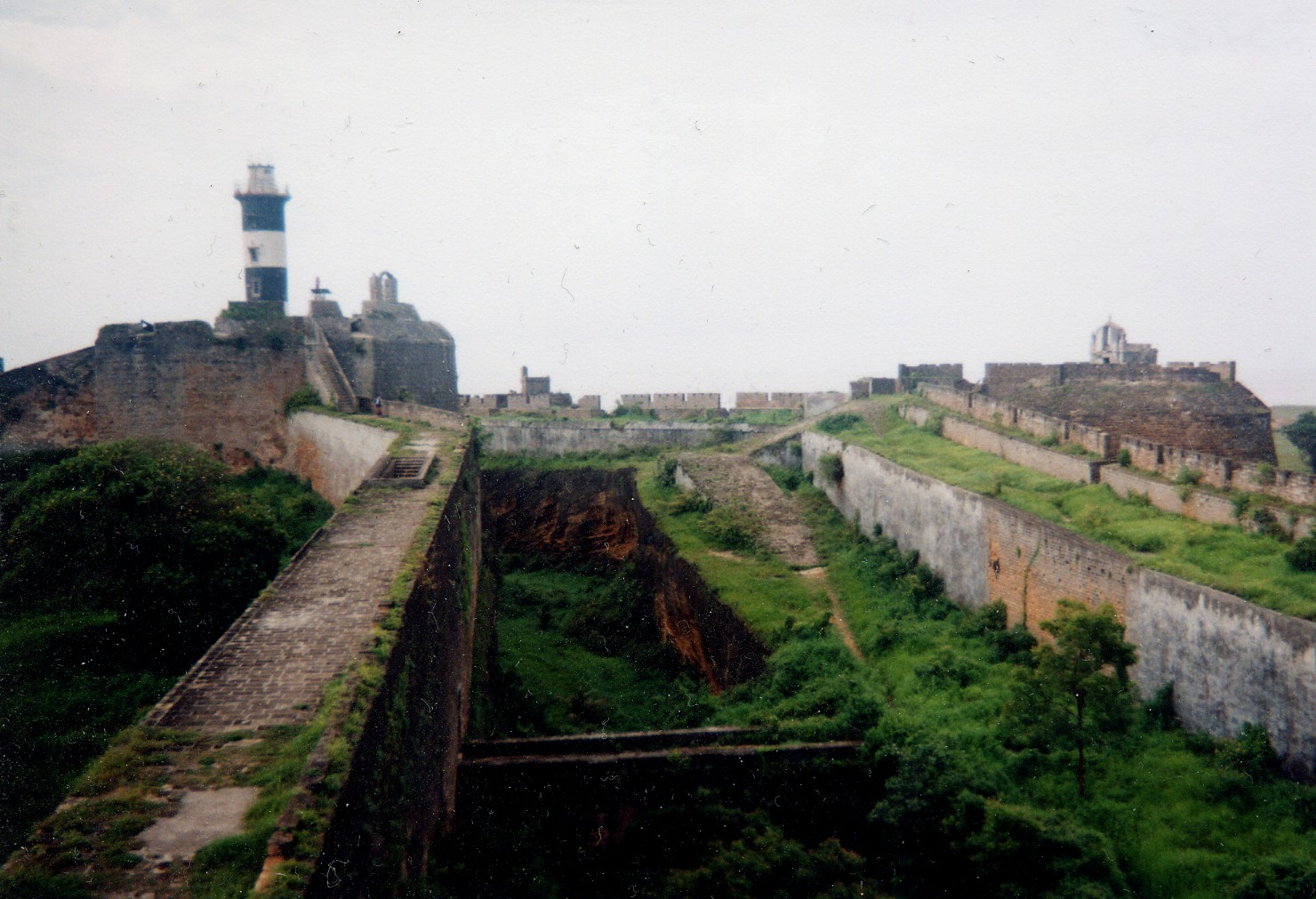
Inner and outer walls

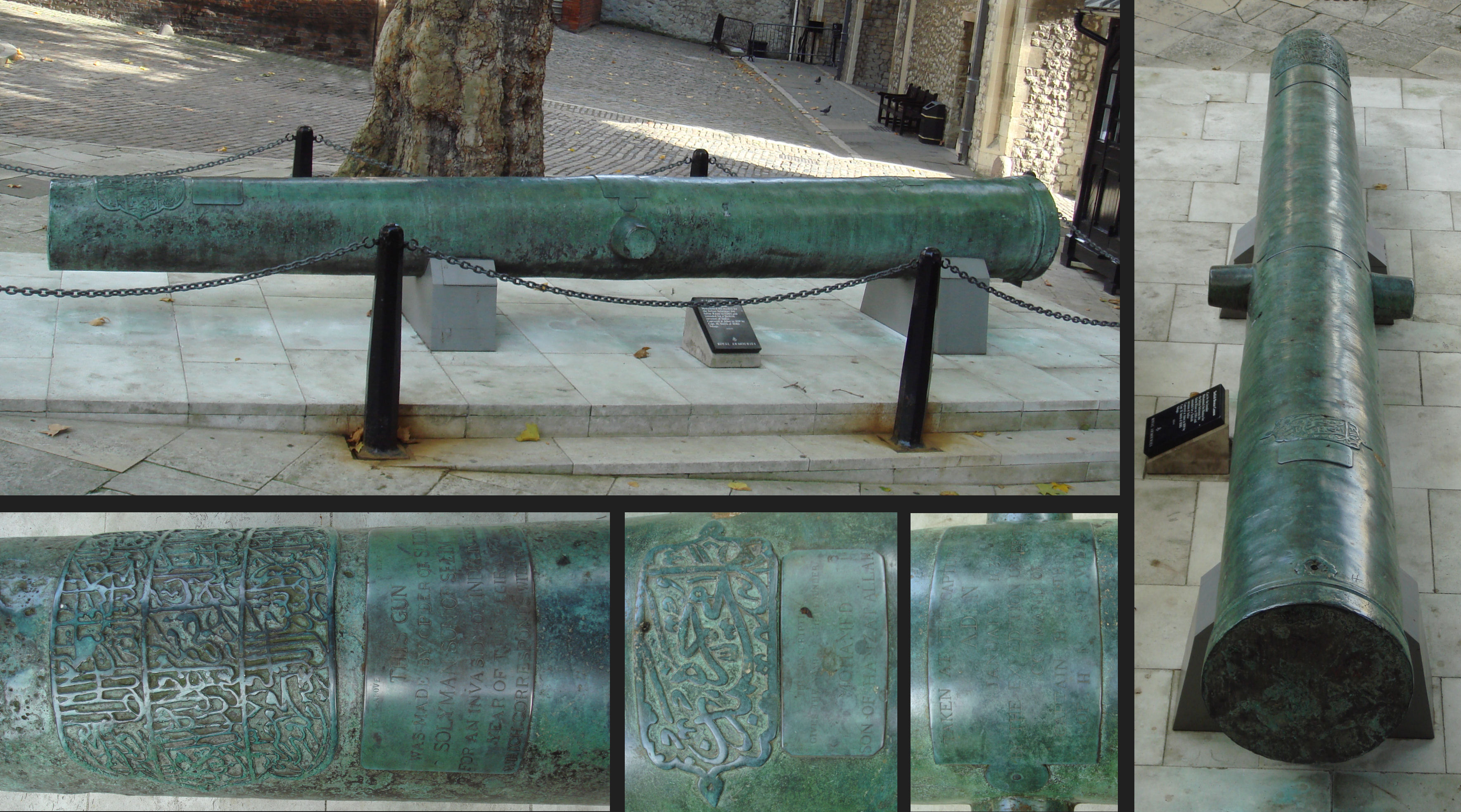
Cannon of Hadım Suleiman Pasha, taken in the capture of Aden in 1839, now in the Tower of London.

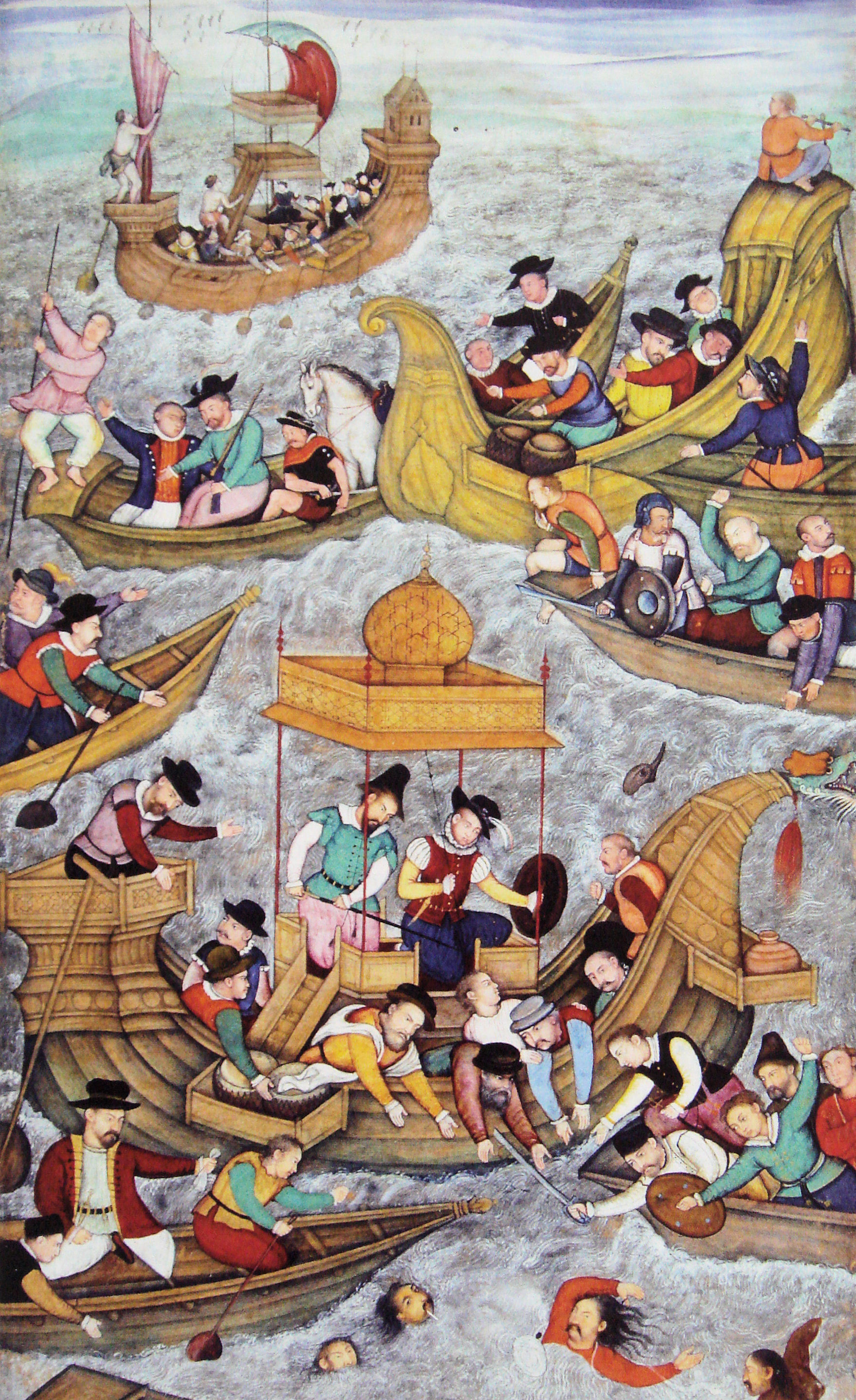
Death of Sultan Bahadur in front of Diu during negotiations with the Portuguese, in 1537. Akbarnama, end of the 16th century.

== See also ==
- Battle of Diu
- Siege of Diu (1531)
- Siege of Diu (1546)
- Catarina Lopes
- Isabel Madeira
