= Siege of Diu (1546) =

Ottoman-Gujarat defeat by Portugal in India

Second siege of Diu (Note: Two earlier sieges of Diu occurred. The 1546 siege is traditionally referred to as the second, not third, siege of Diu: this follows the terminology of early historiography that counts only the two successful Portuguese defences of Diu in assigning ordinal titles to the sieges. The 1538 siege is known as the "first". The siege prior to 1538 – in 1531 – was conducted by the Portuguese against Gujarati-Ottoman defenders, who withstood the attack.)
- Part of Ottoman–Portuguese conflicts (1538–1560) and Gujarati–Portuguese conflicts
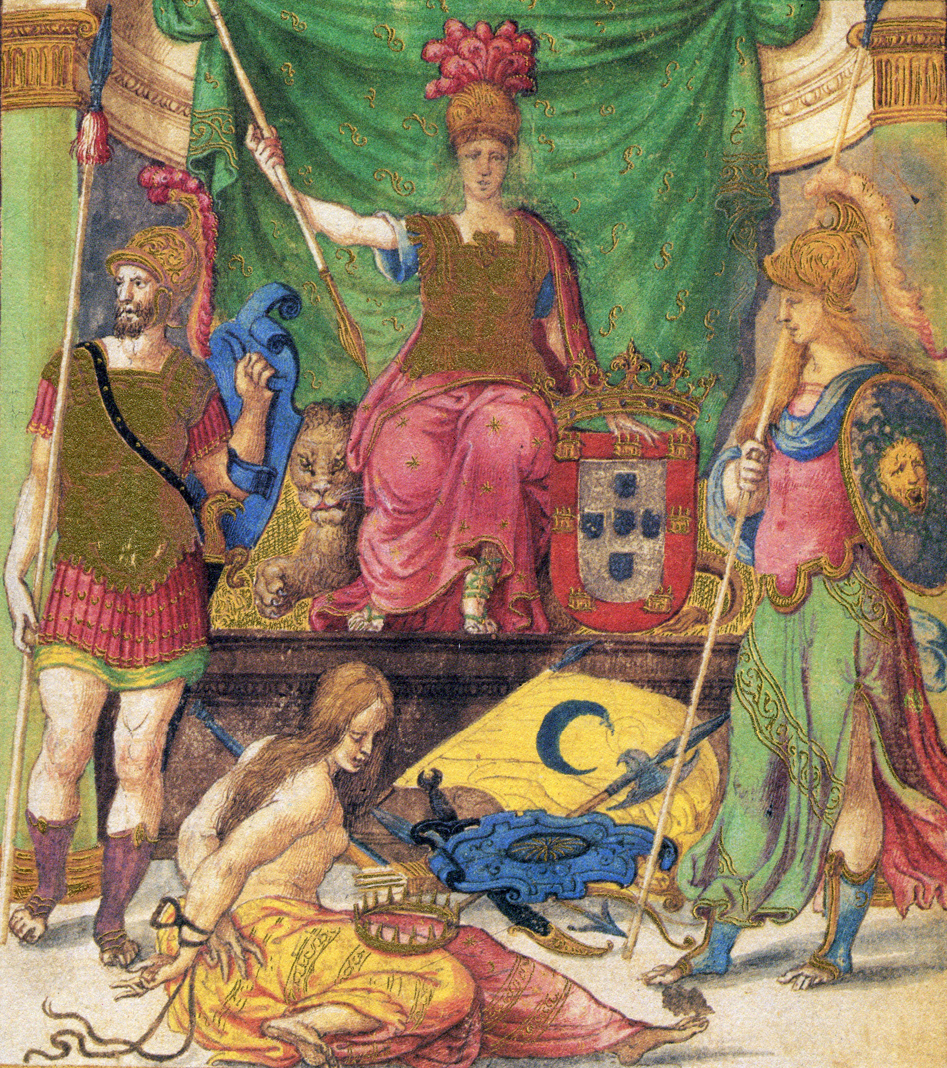
- "The Success of the Second Siege of Diu" by Jerónimo Côrte-Real, 1574
Date	20 April – 11 November 1546; (6 months and 3 weeks)
Location	Diu, Portuguese India 20.71°N 70.98°E
Result	Portuguese victory

Belligerents
Portuguese Empire	Gujarat Sultanate; Ottoman Empire

Commanders and leaders
João de Mascarenhas; João de Castro	Khoja Zufar †

Strength
18 May: 440 men; 19 July: reinforcements consisting of 20 fustas and 6 caturs with men arrived; On 7 November, Governor Castro arrived with 35 fustas, caturs, 3 galeons, naus and gales, with 3,000 Portuguese and 300 Indian men	10,000 men; 30 Ottoman ships

Casualties and losses
More than 200	3,000 killed; 600 prisoners
- Location of Diu in present-day India

The 1546 siege of Diu, also known as the second siege of Diu was conducted by joint forces of the Ottoman Empire and Gujarat Sultanate against the Portuguese Indian city of Diu. It ended with a major Portuguese victory.

== Background ==
At the beginning of the 16th century, the Muslim Sultanate of Gujarat was the principal seapower in India. Gujarat fought the Portuguese fleets in collaboration with the Mamluk Sultanate. The Portuguese were defeated by a combined Mamluk-Gujarati fleet in 1508, which was in turn destroyed by a Portuguese fleet in the Battle of Diu (1509).

The Portuguese again attempted to capture the city in 1531. While the Ottoman-Gujarati defenders successfully withstood the siege, victory was short-lived. In 1535 Sultan Bahadur of Gujarat concluded a peace treaty with the Portuguese, allowing them to build a fort at Diu. By 1536, the Portuguese had gained complete control of Diu, while the Sultanate of Gujarat was under attack from the Mughals.

In 1538, the Ottoman Empire, which had taken over Egypt (1517) and Aden (1538) from Mamluk Egypt, joined hands with the Gujarat Sultanate to launch an anti-Portuguese offensive. They besieged Diu in 1538, but had to retreat.

== The siege ==
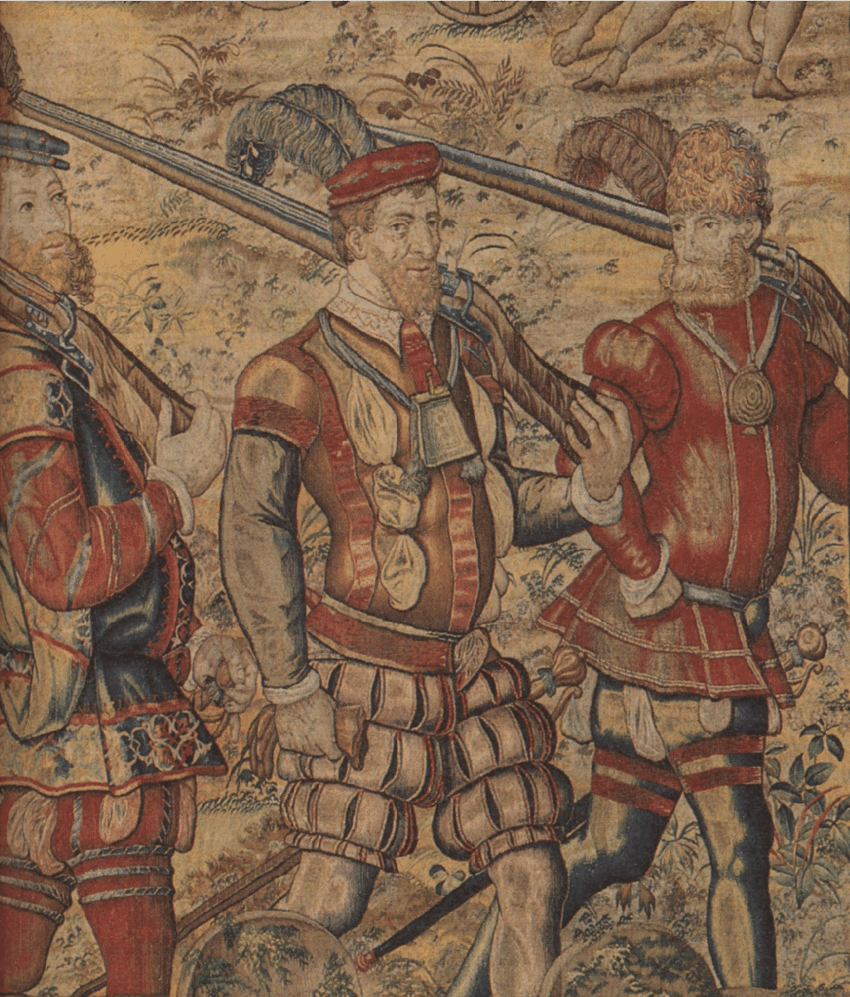
Portuguese arquebusers during the siege

After the failed first siege of 1538, the Gujarati General Khadjar Safar besieged Diu again in an attempt to recapture the island. The siege lasted seven months from 20 April 1546 to 11 November 1546, during which João de Mascarenhas defended Diu.

A large fleet dispatched by Suleiman would also arrive in Diu and help in the struggle against the Portuguese defenders.

The siege ended when a Portuguese fleet under Governor João de Castro arrived and routed the attackers.

Khadjar Safar and his son Muharram Rumi Khan (who were probably of Albanian origin) were both killed during the siege.

== See also ==
- Siege of Diu (1538) – The "first siege", so called as the first successful Portuguese defence of Diu against a Gujarati-Ottoman attempt to recapture Diu
- Siege of Diu (1531) – The earlier siege in which Gujarati and Ottoman forces succeeded in defending the city against Portuguese besiegers
- Catarina Lopes
- Isabel Madeira
