= Tiro de Diu =

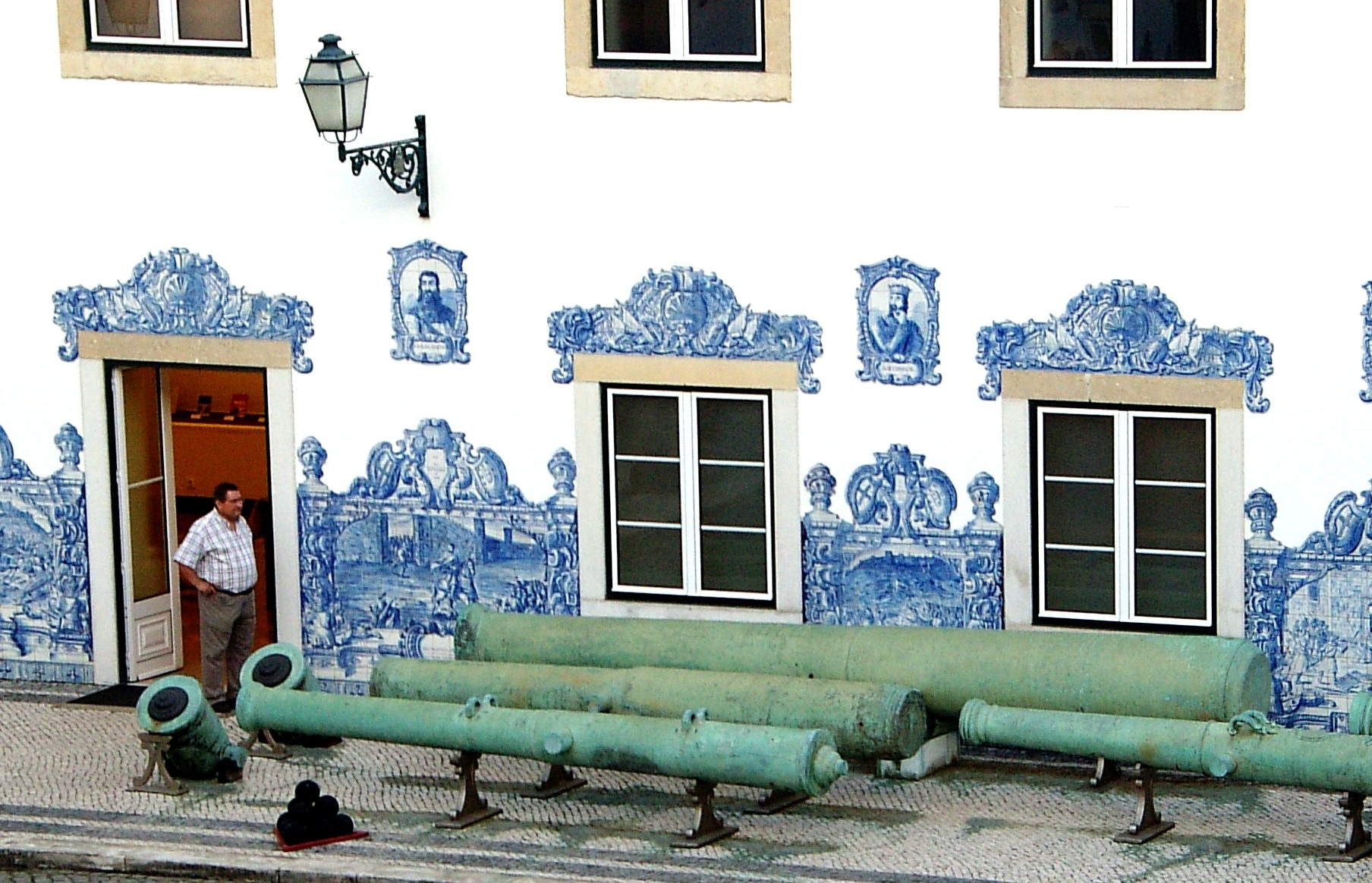
- The Tiro de Diu next to the wall of the Pátio dos Canhões
- Type: Basilisk

Service history
- Used by: Gujarat Sultanate; Portuguese Empire
- Wars: First Siege of Diu

Production history
- Designed: c. 1533

Specifications
- Mass: 20 t
- Barrel length: 586 cm
- Caliber: 24 cm (ball diameter)

The Tiro de Diu is a 16th-century siege cannon, specifically a large-calibre basilisk, which saw action in the First Siege of Diu in 1538.

== History ==
The Tiro de Diu was cast in bronze in 1533 during the reign of Sultan Bahadur Shah of Gujarat and was used during the First Siege of Diu in 1538.

The basilisk is cast in one solid piece and has no ornaments whatsoever except for some laudatory Arabic inscriptions that can be roughly translated as follows:

From our Lord the Sultan of Sultans of all ages; life-giver of the tradition of the Prophet of the Merciful God; the one that fights for the exaltation of the precepts of the Koran; the destroyer of the arguments of the supporters of wickedness; the one that casts away the houses of worshippers of idols; the Victor of the day when the two armies will meet; heir to the kingdom of Solomon; the one who trusts in the God the Benefactor; the possessor of all the virtues – Bahadur-Shah

After the defeat of the Muslim forces, the gun was sent to Lisbon, first being set in the Castle of São Jorge and, after 1640, in the Fortress of S. Julião da Barra, in Oeiras, to defend the mouth of the River Tagus.

By mid 18th century the gun was again removed, this time being sent to the Lisbon arsenal to be melted, so that the metal could be used to cast a statue of king D. José I. However, a scholar noticed the Arabic inscriptions on the gun and, after discovering the historical value of the piece, the gun was spared.

It is now on display on the "Pátio dos Canhões" at the Lisbon Military Museum.

Image gallery

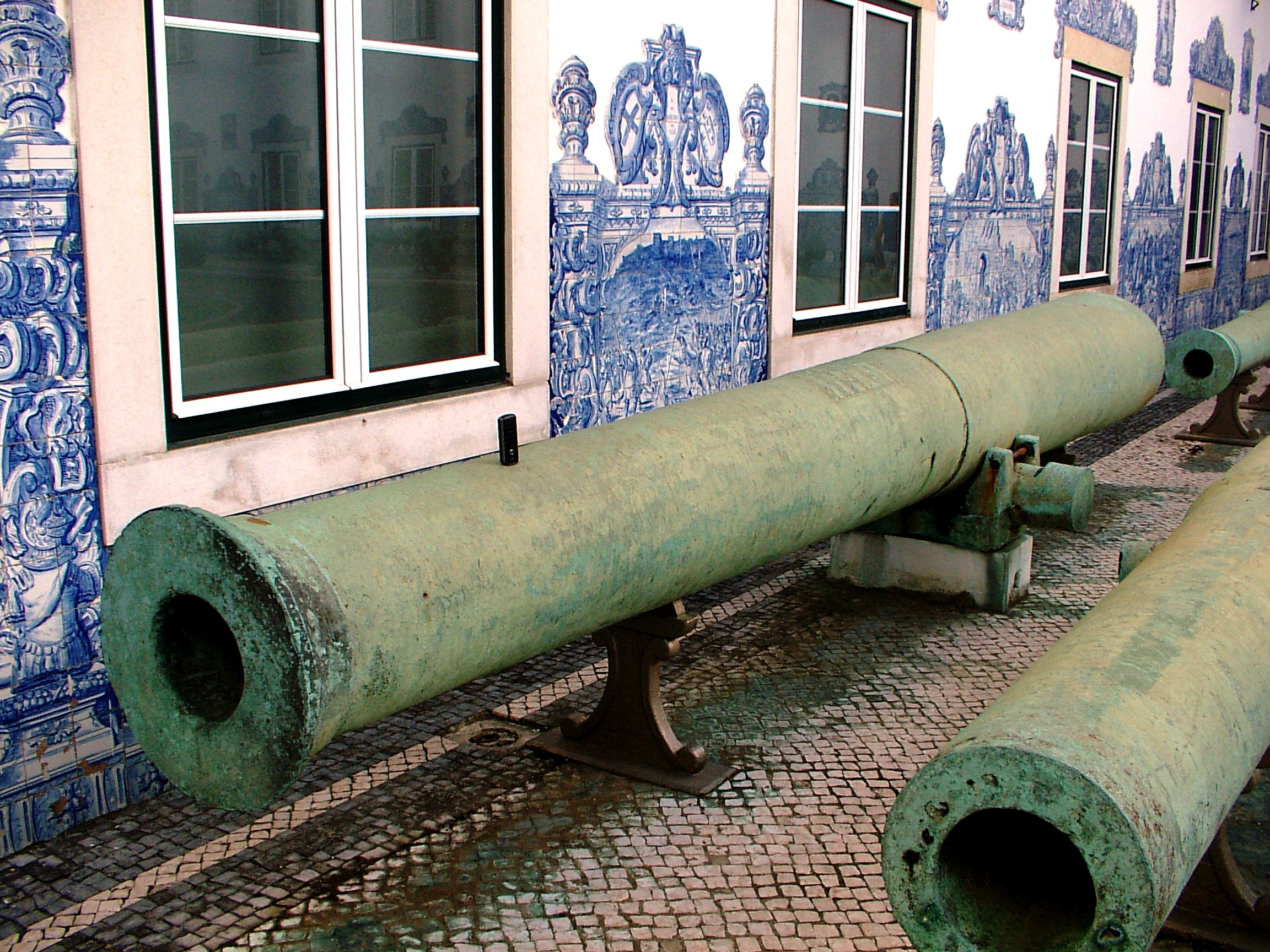
Close up of the gun

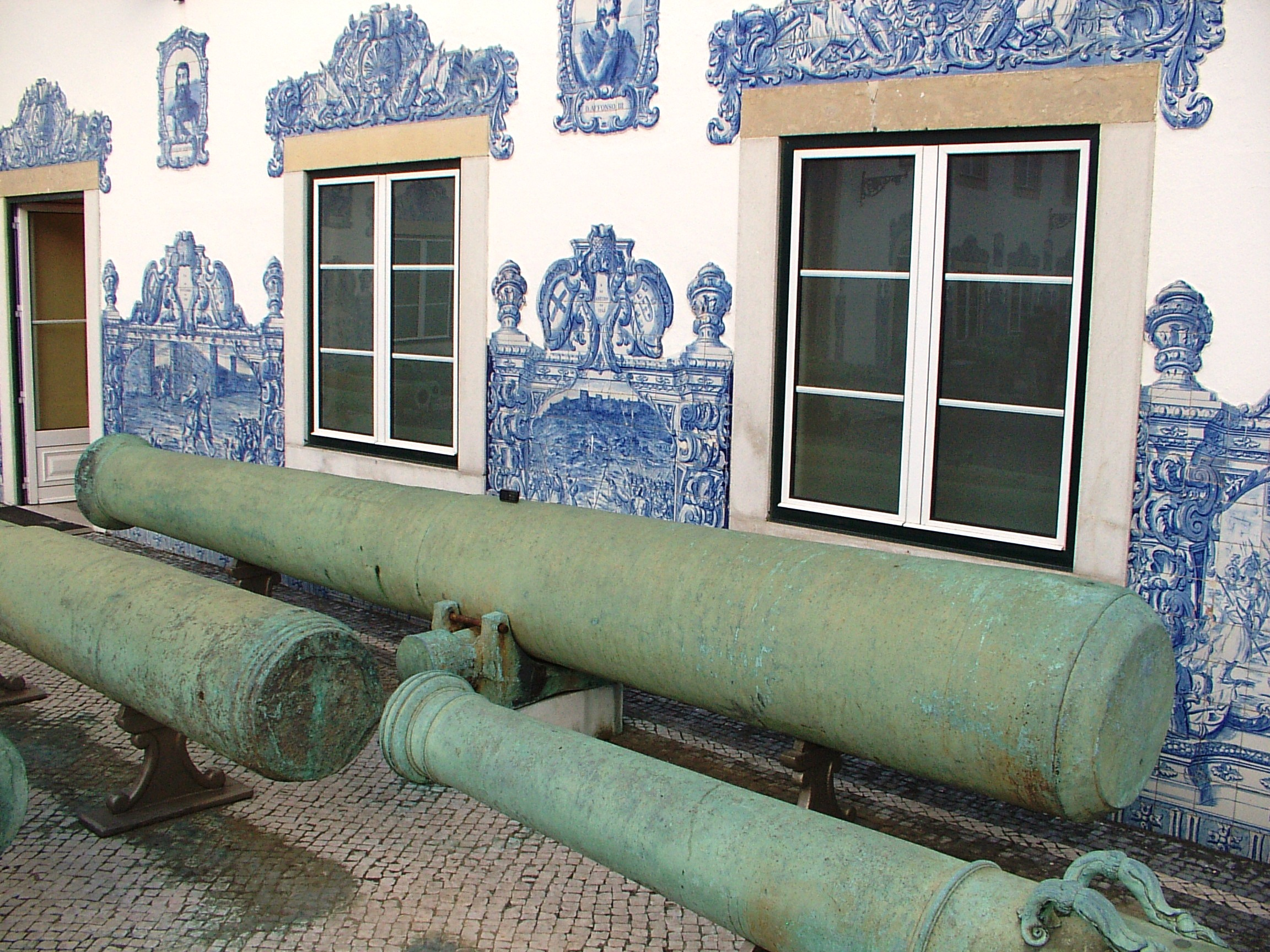
Alternate view

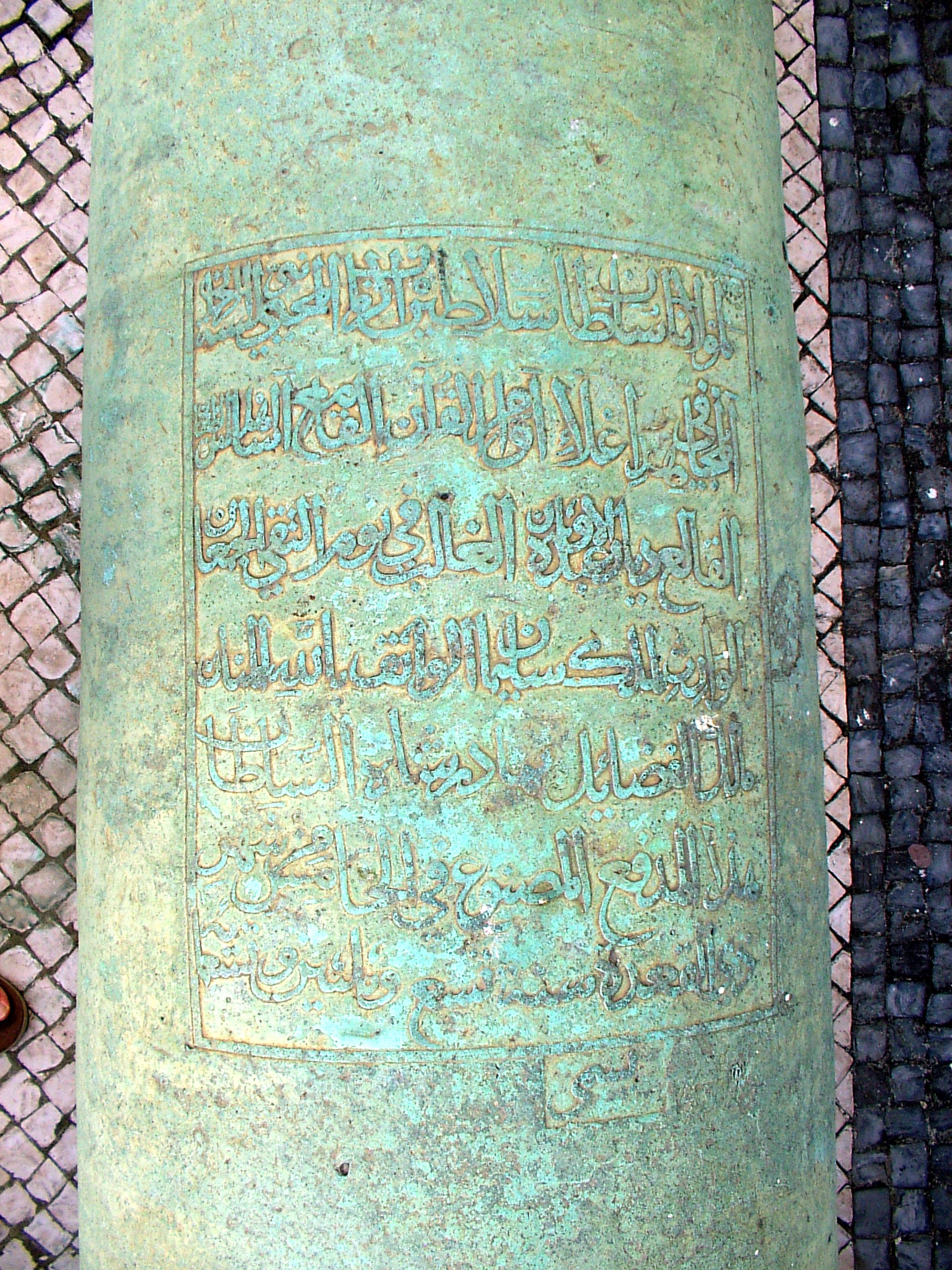
Arabic inscriptions

== See also ==
- List of the largest cannon by calibre

== Sources ==
- Jorge Santos Alves (dir.), " Fernão Mendes Pinto and the Peregrinação", Fundação Oriente/INCM, Vol. 1 Studies (2010), p. 33
