= Catarina Lopes =

Portuguese soldier

Personal details
- Born: 16th-century
- Died: Unknown
- Occupation: Military commander

Military service
- Unit: Portuguese Empire
- Battles/wars: Siege of Diu (1546)

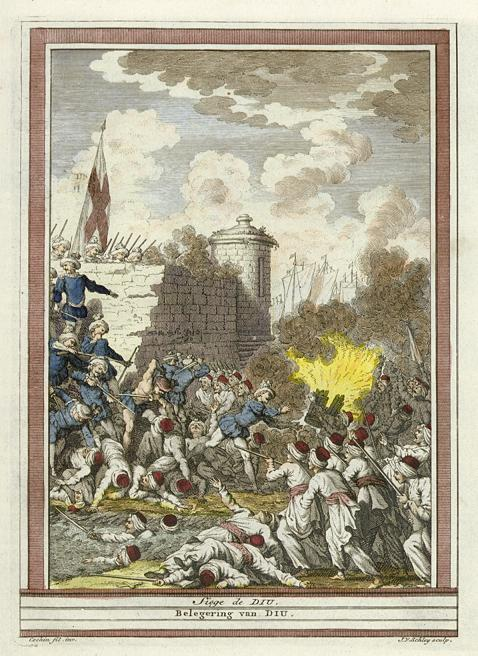
An 18th-century depiction of the Siege of Diu

Catarina Lopes (16th-century) was a Portuguese soldier, she fought alongside other men and women soldiers in the Siege of Diu. She is known for forming a group of combatants to fight for Portuguese Empire against Sultanate of Gujarat and Ottoman Empire.

== Biography ==
Catarina de Lopes together with Isabel Madeira (captain), and with Garcia Rodrigues, Isabel Fernandes, Isabel Dias, formed a group of female combatants who fought in front of the battle against the Turks at the Siege of Diu in (1546).

This achievement is recorded in the Decades of Diogo de Couto, and in a magazine of 1842 it was described as follows:

From the first siege of Diu, let us move on to the second. This one, who was worthy of his person, the famous and enlightened Captain D. João Mascarenhas, in the time of the distinguished D. João de Castro, one of the greatest men, who with great credit and equal glory of Portugal, ruled the States of India) was certainly by the circumstances that came together much more formidable than the first. For this reason a great company of women was formed, so that united one and another effort, masculine and feminine, could more strongly resist the fury of the enemies. Among them were the names of Garcia Rodrigues, Isabel Dias, Catharina Lopes, and Isabel Fernandes, all of whom ruled as Captain Isabel Madeira. These, in such a way, will be in this memorable siege, that not only according to the repairs of the walls and bastions, but that, aiding the same Soldiers, to them it is due not to be surrendered that Fortress.

In particular, on the subject of Catarina Lopes, it is added:

In the said siege of Diu, she gave a very distinct proof of her value Catarina Lopes. It was the case, that she wanting to reject the pride of an enemy combatant, who had advanced to the walls, fell of them down along with the soldier. He wanted to fill his anger, using all his strength to suppress those of the valiant matron. But, putting aside the natural weakness, she was clothed with such a manly spirit, that coming with him to the fight, cast him down to the ground, and having no weapon wherewith to smite him, she took advantage of those which his own wrath ministered to her (for as a poet said: Furor arma ministrat. Virgílio.) And so she put her fingers in his eyes, and plucked them out; and then rescued from their own, escaped the rage of their enemies, who, with their hands raised, avenged the insult.
