= Isabel Madeira =

Personal details
- Born: 16th-century
- Died: Unknown
- Occupation: Military commander

Military service
- Rank: Captain
- Unit: Portuguese Empire
- Commands: Female Battalion Captain
- Battles/wars: Siege of Diu (1546)

Isabel Madeira (floruit 1546) was a Portuguese soldier, known for her participation in the defence of Portuguese Diu in India during the siege of 1546. She was the captain of a battalion of female combatants.

== Biography ==
During the Second Siege of Diu, in 1546, the captain Isabel Madeira, together with Isabel Fernandes, Garcia Rodrigues, Catarina Lopes and Isabel Dias, commanded a battalion of female combatants, including D.João de Mascarenhas, commander of the fortress of Diu, due to the fact that the garrison was small and had already suffered casualties. She also oversaw the repair of the bulwarks destroyed by the enemy artillery and helped her husband, a surgeon, to treat the sick. It is said that she went to bury her husband, killed in an attack on the Bastion of St. George, and then returned to the battlefield.

This achievement is recorded in the Decades of Diogo de Couto, and in a magazine of 1842 it was described as follows:

From the first siege of Diu, let us move on to the second. This one, who was worthy of his person, the famous and enlightened Captain D. João Mascarenhas, in the time of the distinguished D. João de Castro, one of the greatest men, who with great credit and equal glory of Portugal, ruled the States of India) was certainly by the circumstances that came together much more formidable than the first. For this reason a great company of women was formed, so that united one and another effort, masculine and feminine, could more strongly resist the fury of the enemies. Among them were the names of Garcia Rodrigues, Isabel Dias, Catharina Lopes, and Isabel Fernandes, all of whom ruled as Captain Isabel Madeira. These, in such a way, will be in this memorable siege, that not only according to the repairs of the walls and bastions, but that, aiding the same Soldiers, to them it is due not to be surrendered that Fortress.

== Sources ==
- (1842) "Heroínas Portuguesas". O Recreio (jornal das famílias) 8. Imprensa Nacional.
