= Portuguese Castle =

Portuguese Castle may refer to:

- Castles in Portugal
- Fort of Our Lady of the Conception in Hormoz island, also known as the Portuguese Castle
- Rasini, also known as Portuguese Castle
