= Rasini (disambiguation) =

Rasini is a small town in the southern Lower Juba province of Somalia.

Rasini may also refer to:

- Banca Rasini, an Italian bank in Milan
- Sandro Rasini (1918 – 2006), an Italian bobsledder

== See also ==
- Razin (disambiguation)
