= Siege of Bahrain =

1559 siege

Siege of Bahrain 1559
- Part of Ottoman–Portuguese conflicts (1538–1559)
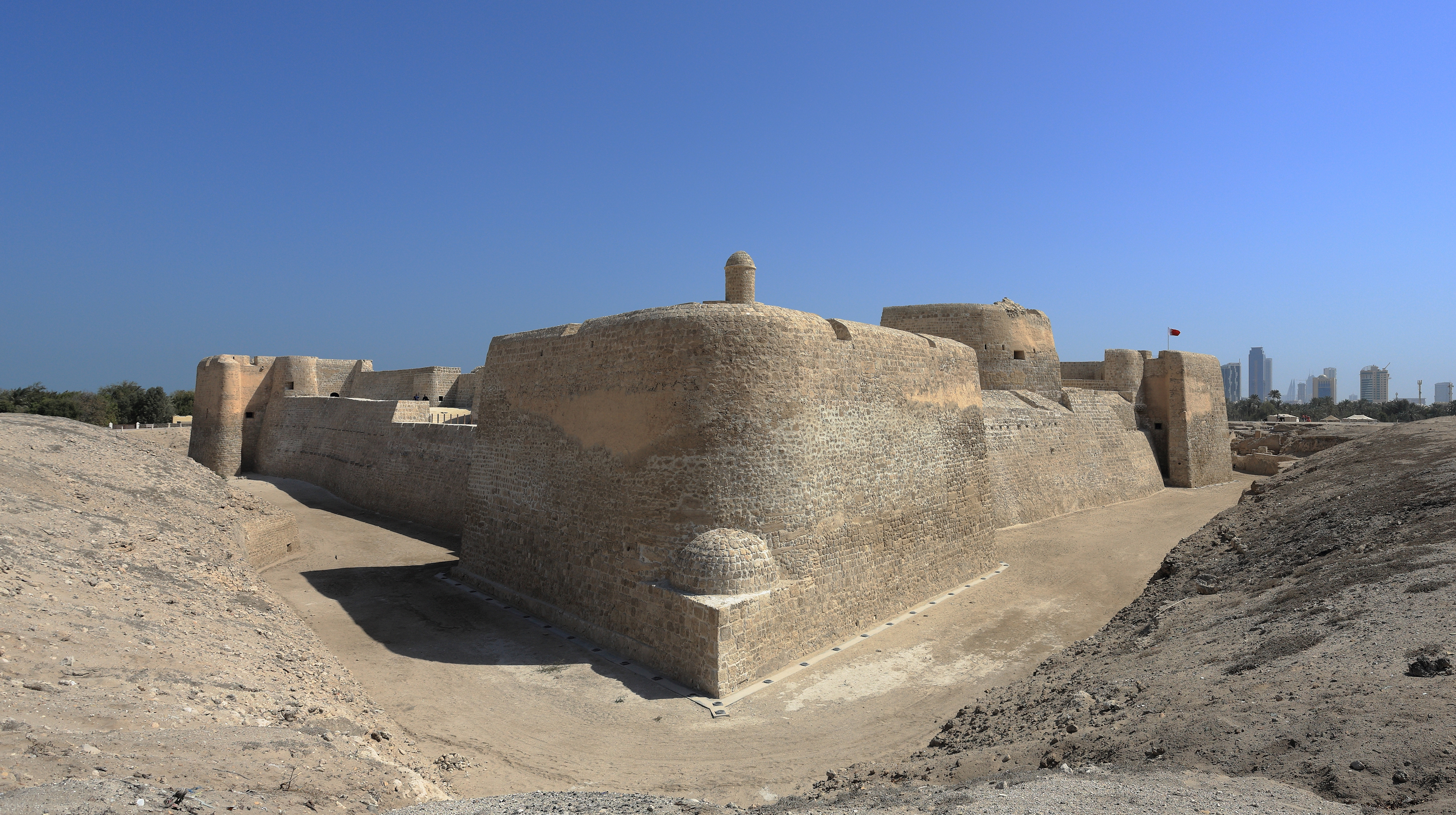
- Portuguese fortress of Bahrain, modern-day.
Date	July – November 1559
Location	Bahrain
Result	Portuguese victory

Belligerents
Portuguese Empire; Kingdom of Hormuz	Ottoman Empire

Commanders and leaders
Dom António de Noronha; Álvaro da Silveira †; Morad Shah	Mustafa Pasha †

Strength
400 Persian mercenaries about 1,000 Portuguese; 1 war-caravel 30 light-galleys	800–1,200 Turks; 2 galleys, 70 transports

Casualties and losses
Heavy	Heavy

The siege of Bahrain of 1559 occurred when forces of the Ottoman Empire, commanded by the governor of the Lahsa eyalet Mustafa Pasha, attempted to seize Bahrain, and thus wrest control of the island and its famed pearl trade from the Portuguese Empire. The siege was unsuccessful, and the Portuguese defeated the Turks when reinforcements were dispatched by sea from the fortress of Hormuz.

== Background ==
Bahrain was then a dominion of the King of Hormuz, himself a puppet of Portugal ever since the Portuguese took over Hormuz in 1515.

In 1538, the Ottoman Empire captured the port city of Basra, gaining access to the Persian Gulf, and thus coming into contact with the Portuguese. In 1552 the Lahsa Eyalet was established. Its governor, Mustafa Pasha intended to capture Bahrain and its famed pearl fishing that was developed there. To this effect, he mustered two galleys and 70 transport boats to ferry some 800 to 1,200 men from Qatif over to Bahrain.

== Siege ==
The Turks landed in Bahrain in July, and promptly attacked the Bahrain fort with artillery pieces. It was defended by the Hormuzi Persian governor Morad Shah (Rax Morado in Portuguese), ahead of 400 Persian mercenaries, who held firm against the Ottoman bombardment, and dispatched a fast craft to Hormuz with a distress signal.

Upon receiving the distress signal, the captain of Hormuz Dom António de Noronha dispatched his nephew Dom João de Noronha with a reinforcement of 10 light galleys (foists) to Bahrain, and ordered captain Álvaro da Silveira at Muscat to proceed there with his forces aboard a war-caravel and a few light-galleys. Because Dom João was young and inexperienced though, upon reaching Bahrain the Turks scattered his small fleet.

Captain Álvaro da Silveira was more successful: Taking the route towards Al-Qatif, he was able to approach Bahrain from the west rather than east, and thus trick the Turks into believing his fleet were friendly reinforcements sent from Basra. Taking advantage of morning haze, Álvaro da Silveira was able to surprise and capture the Ottoman fleet, thus trapping the Turks on the island. The Turks lifted the siege, but retreated to a palm-grove where they set up camp.

Several weeks of skirmishing elapsed, as the Portuguese were unable to dislodge the Turks. Dom António de Noronha even commissioned the chief-architect Inofre de Carvalho, by chance then conducting renovations in the fortress of Hormuz, to build a very large war-wagon, armed with artillery pieces:

[...] a wooden machine on high wheels, on top of which some men would fight and put there some pieces of artillery, for Dom António de Noronha determined to take this machine forwards, so the Turks would break against it the fury of their first volley of arquebusery

Eventually, an outbreak of plague befell the Turks and Portuguese, causing great losses on both sides, and the Turks offered terms. Dom Ántónio de Noronha permitted that the Turks be ferried back to Al-Qatif on November 6, in exchange for relinquishing their weapons and paying an indemnity of 12,000 cruzados or one million akçes, which they agreed.

== Aftermath ==
The siege of Bahrain of 1559 marked the end of Ottoman attempts to challenge Portuguese hegemony in the Persian Gulf. The Ottomans would only make another attempt against the Portuguese 21 years later, when admiral Mir Ali Beg commanded a small fleet to the east-African coast in 1580.

== See also ==
- Kingdom of Ormus
- Ottoman-Portuguese conflicts (1580-1589)
