= Battle of Socotra =

1507 Portuguese victory over the Mahra Sultanate

- Part of Portuguese Battles in the East
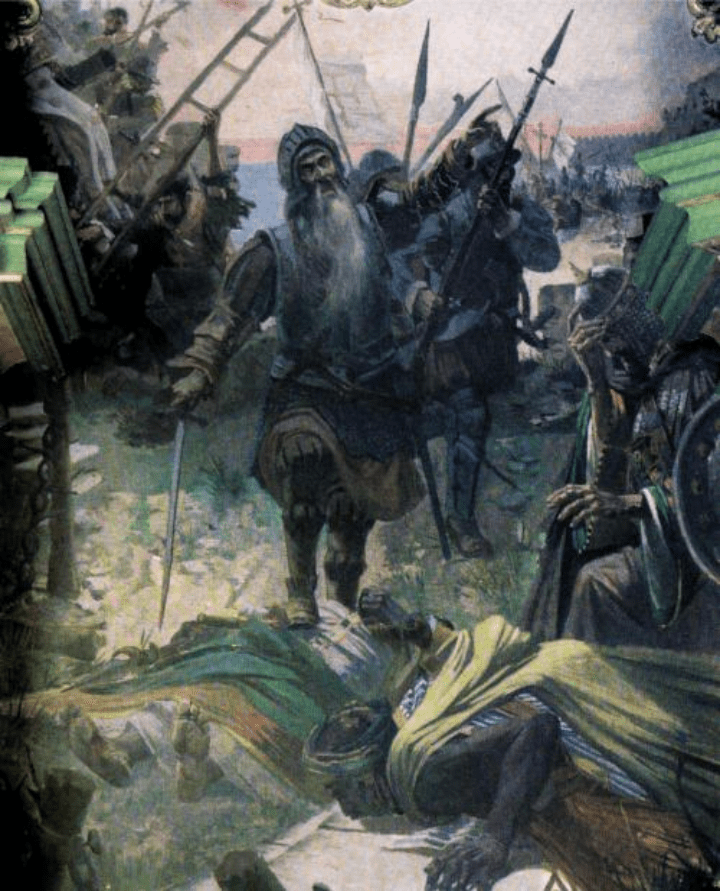
- Conquest of Socotra by Jorge Colaço (1903)
| Date | 1507 |
| Location | Suq, Socotra |
| Result | Portuguese victory |
| Territorial changes | Portuguese occupation commences |

Belligerents
| Portuguese Empire | Mahra Sultanate |

Commanders and leaders
| Tristão da Cunha; Afonso de Albuquerque | Sheikh Ibrahim † |

Strength
| 400 men 14 ships | 130 men |

Casualties and losses
| Few | Heavy |

The Battle of Socotra was a military engagement that took place on Socotra Island in 1507, and which resulted in the occupation of the Island by the Portuguese Empire as Portuguese Socotra.

== Context ==
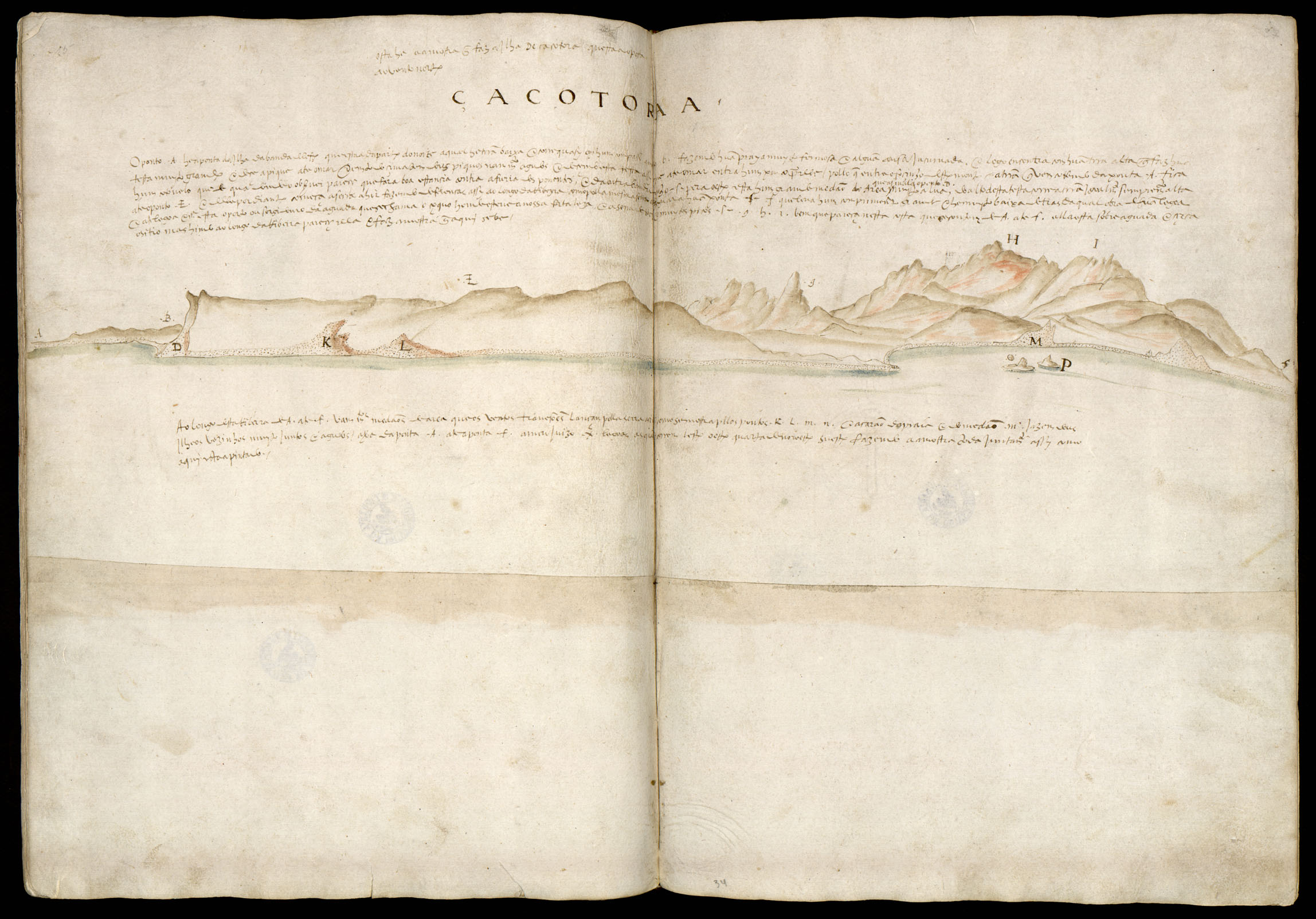
Çacotoraa in a 16th century Portuguese sketch by João de Castro

The island of Socotra was first contacted by the Portuguese in 1506, by the captain Fernandes Pereira, part of a fleet commanded by Lopo Soares de Albergaria.

In April 1506, a fleet of ten ships under Tristão da Cunha and four ships under Afonso de Albuquerque departed Lisbon, tasked by king Manuel among other things to capture Socotra, from which a fleet could be based to blockade the Red Sea. This was a response to the anti-Portuguese Venetian-Egyptian alliance which would be defeated at the Battle of Diu in 1509.

== Battle ==
The Portuguese found at Suq a well-fortified Muslim fort built by the Mahra of Qishn in Yemen on the Arabian mainland, which was used to collect tribute from the surrounding inhabitants. It had a barbican and keep. Cunha sent the commander of the fort an ultimatum, in which he offered him the chance to surrender peacefully, otherwise he'd attack the fort and leave none alive, but the commander refused. The Portuguese landed divided in two squadrons, one led by Cunha and another by Albuquerque. The commander of the fort sallied out and engaged the squadron of Albuquerque in hand-to-hand combat but his men were routed and he was killed. The fort was captured from the Mahra after a stiff battle. Cunha then proceeded to India with his vessels while Albuquerque was left on the island with 400 men and 6 ships.

== Aftermath ==
The architect Tomás Fernandes built a fortress at Suq, fort São Miguel de Socotorá. Within, the Portuguese built a church, named Nossa Senhora da Vitória, where the Franciscan friar António do Loureiro said mass. The first commander of the fort was Dom Afonso de Noronha. Socotra harboured a community of Nestorian Christians, and after a proclamation by Cunha many returned to Suq, expressing their gratitude to the Portuguese for freeing them from Muslim rule. Afonso de Albuquerque then redistributed the palm groves which had belonged to the resident Muslims and the mosque to the Christians.

Perceiving that Socotra was too far removed from meaningful trade routes and resource poor, after taking office as governor of India Afonso de Albuquerque ordered the evacuation of the fort. In 1511 the Portuguese abandoned Socotra and the Mahra sultans regained control of the island.

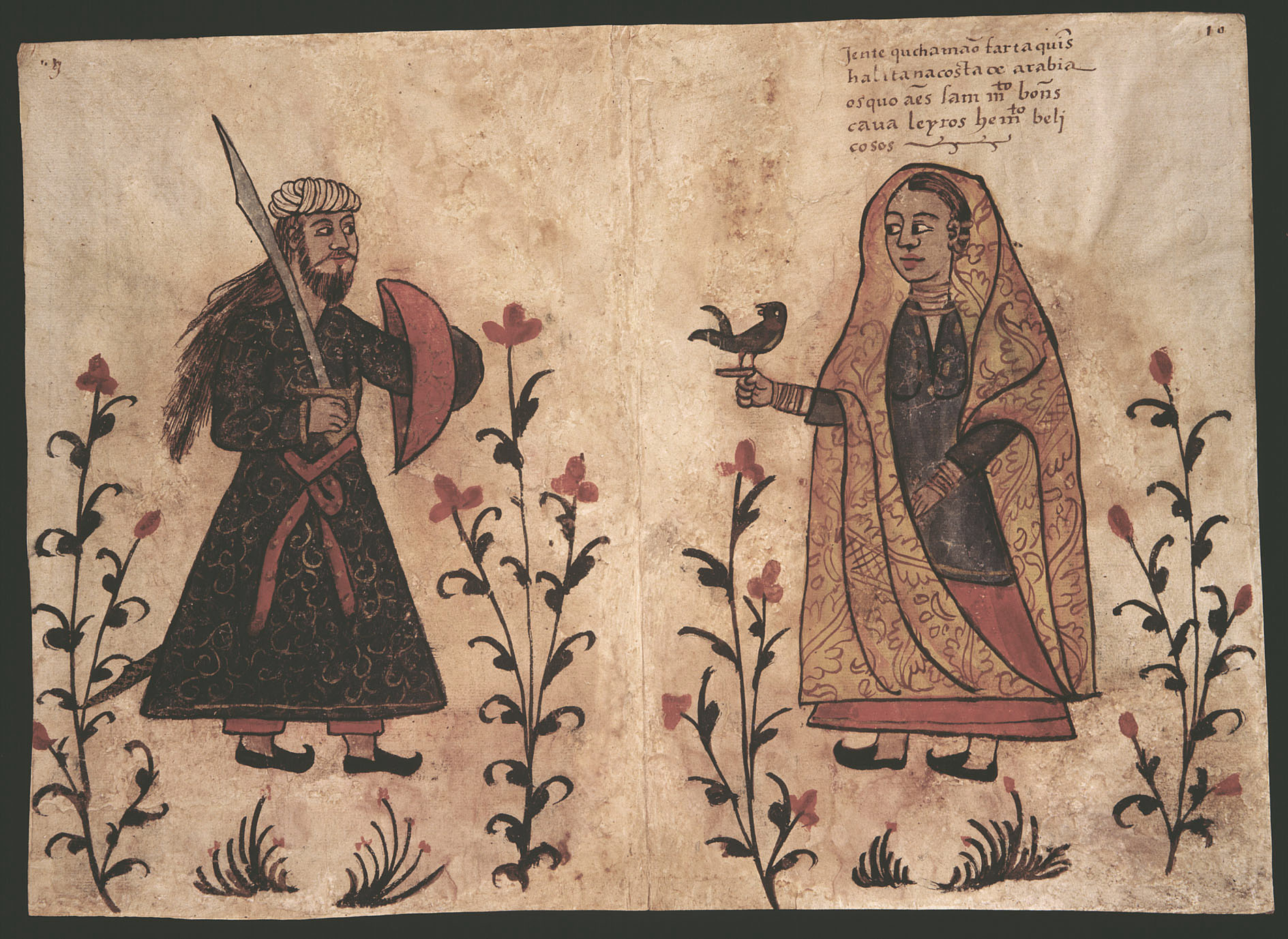
16th century Portuguese watercolour sketch of Yemenis, called by the Portuguese Fartaques. Códice Casanatense.

Socotra would remain a frequent port of call for Portuguese merchants and warships in the future. In the 19th century, a large number of inhabitants in the hill country still claimed descent from the Portuguese.

== See also ==
- Portuguese India
- Mamluk–Portuguese conflicts
- Portuguese India Armadas
- Portuguese conquest of Hormuz
