= Teldi =

Teldi is an Italian surname. Notable people with the surname include:

- Francesco Teldi, Venetian trader and diplomat
- Tilde Teldi, Italian actress
