= Mamluk–Portuguese conflicts =

1505–1517 conflict in the Indian Ocean

Mamluk–Portuguese war
- Part of Portuguese presence in Asia
- Portuguese presence in the Indian Ocean in the early 16th century.
| Date | 1504 – January 26, 1517 |
| Location | Indian Ocean |
| Result | Portuguese dominance of most of the Indian ocean secured.; The Mamluk Sultanate becomes financially crippled.; Failed Portuguese invasion of the Red Sea. |
| Territorial changes | The Portuguese assert dominance over most of the Indian ocean region and the spice trade. |

Belligerents
| Portuguese Empire | Mamluk Sultanate; Supported by: Republic of Venice; Kingdom of Calicut; Ottoman Empire |

Commanders and leaders
| Manuel I Dom Francisco de Almeida; Afonso de Albuquerque; Lopo Soares de Albergaria | Qansuh al-Ghuri; Amir Husain Al-Kurdi; Alaa el-Din bin el-Emam; Selman Reis |

A number of armed engagements between the Egyptian Mamluk Sultanate and the Portuguese Empire in the Indian Ocean took place during the early part of the 16th century. The conflicts came following the expansion of the Portuguese after sailing around the Cape of Good Hope in 1498, from 1504 to the fall of the Mamluk Sultanate in 1517.

== Operations ==
=== Background ===
Following the Portuguese bombardment of Calicut in 1500–01 by the 2nd Portuguese India Armada under Cabral, the spice trade linking India to Egypt and then Venice was seriously diminished and prices shot up. Arab shipping was also being attacked directly: in 1503, the first Egyptian ship was looted and sunk by the Portuguese as it was returning from India. In 1504, 17 Arab ships were destroyed by the Portuguese in the Indian harbour of Panane.

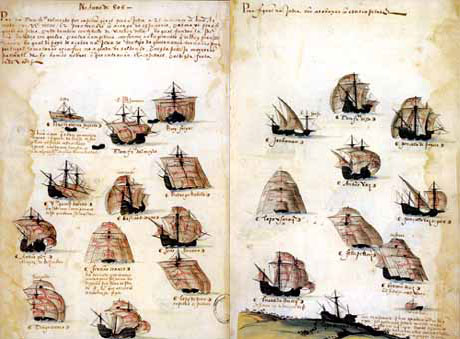
The 7th Portuguese India Armada battled in the Indian Ocean from 1505.

In 1504, the Mamluk Sultan Qansuh al-Ghuri first sent an envoy to the Pope, in the person of the Grand Prior of the Saint Catherine's Monastery, warning that if the Pope did not stop the exactions of the Portuguese against Muslims, he would bring ruin to the Christian Holy Place in the Levant and to the Christians living in his realm.

In 1504, the Venetians, who shared common interests with the Mamluks in the spice trade and desired to eliminate the Portuguese challenge if possible, sent envoy Francesco Teldi to Cairo. Teldi tried to find a level of cooperation between the two realms, encouraging the Mamluks to block Portuguese navigations. The Venetians claimed they could not intervene directly, and encouraged the Mamluk Sultan Qansuh al-Ghuri to take action by getting into contact with Indian princes at Cochin and Cananor to entice them not to trade with the Portuguese, and the Sultans of Calicut and Cambay to fight against them. Some sort of alliance was thus concluded between the Venetians and the Mamluks against the Portuguese. There were claims, voiced during the War of the League of Cambrai, that the Venetians had supplied the Mamluks with weapons and skilled shipwrights.

The Mamluks however had little inclination for naval operations: "The war against the Portuguese, being mainly a naval war, was entirely alien to the Mamluk and little to his taste. The navy and everything connected with it was despised by the land-minded Mamluk horsemen".

The Portuguese however kept blockading the Red Sea, and arresting Muslim merchant ships.

=== Battle of Pandarane (1504) ===
In the Autumn of 1504, a Portuguese force commanded by Lopo Soares de Albergaria encountered a Mamluk armada near Pandarane in India and a battle ensued. The Portuguese inflicted a crushing defeat on the Muslims.

=== Mamluk expedition (1505) ===
In 1505 the Mamluk Sultan Qansuh al-Ghuri ordered an expedition against the Portuguese. The fleet was built with timber and weapons from the Ottoman Empire, and crews and shipwrights were recruited throughout the eastern Mediterranean. The expedition, under Amir Husain Al-Kurdi, left Suez in November and travelled by sea to Jeddah, where they fortified the city. The fleet then prepared itself to go to Aden. This coincided with the dispatch of the 7th Portuguese India Armada into the Indian Ocean, under Francisco de Almeida.

In 1506, another fleet under Afonso de Albuquerque started to raid the coasts of Arabia and the Horn of Africa, after defeating a Muslim fleet. In 1507, a fleet of about 20 Portuguese ships entered the Red Sea and raided Indian shipping there, bringing the Mamluk Indian trade to near collapse. The Portuguese attempted to establish a base at Socotra in 1507 in order to stop the Mamluk trade through the Red Sea, but the island proved too inhospitable and was ineffective in that role, so that the Portuguese left after a few months.

In August–September 1507, the Mamluk fleet of about 50 vessels was stationed at Aden, preparing to go to India.

=== Battle of Chaul (1508) ===
The fleet, again under Amir Husain Al-Kurdi, was sent to India in 1507. The Mamluks allied themselves with the Muslim Gujarat Sultanate, the first naval power of India at that time. The fleet was warmly welcomed in Diu, and Husain Al-Kurdi joined Meliqueaz, a Mamluk admiral of Dalmatian origin serving Gujarat, as leader of the Mamluk fleet at the battle of Chaul, where they faced and defeated the fleet of Lourenço de Almeida, son of the Portuguese viceroy of India, D. Francisco de Almeida.

=== Battle of Diu (1509) ===
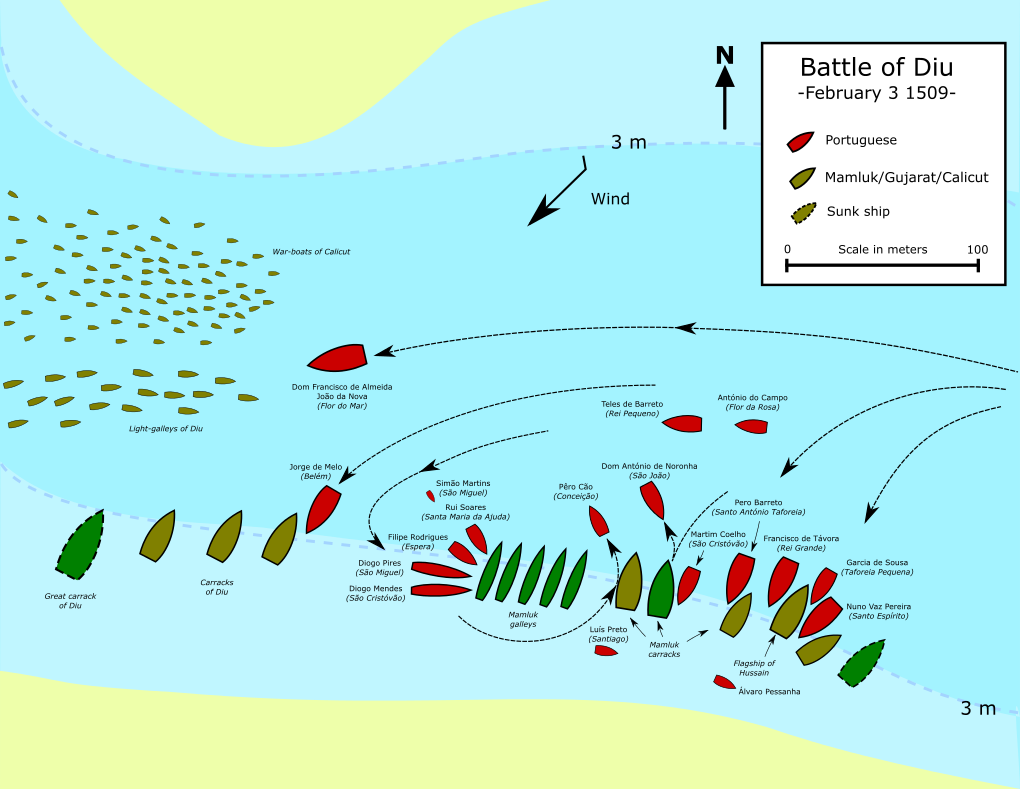
Battle of Diu, 1509. Diagram.

Following this battle, the Portuguese fiercely fought back led by the viceroy himself, who was seeking to avenge the death of his son and free the Portuguese prisoners made at Chaul in 1508. The Portuguese eventually succeeded in eliminating the Mamluk southern fleet in 1509 at the Battle of Diu.

Mamluk resistance prevented the Portuguese from blocking Red Sea trade completely. However, supply interruption was enough to force prices in Egypt to astronomical levels.

== Diplomacy ==
=== Venetian diplomacy ===
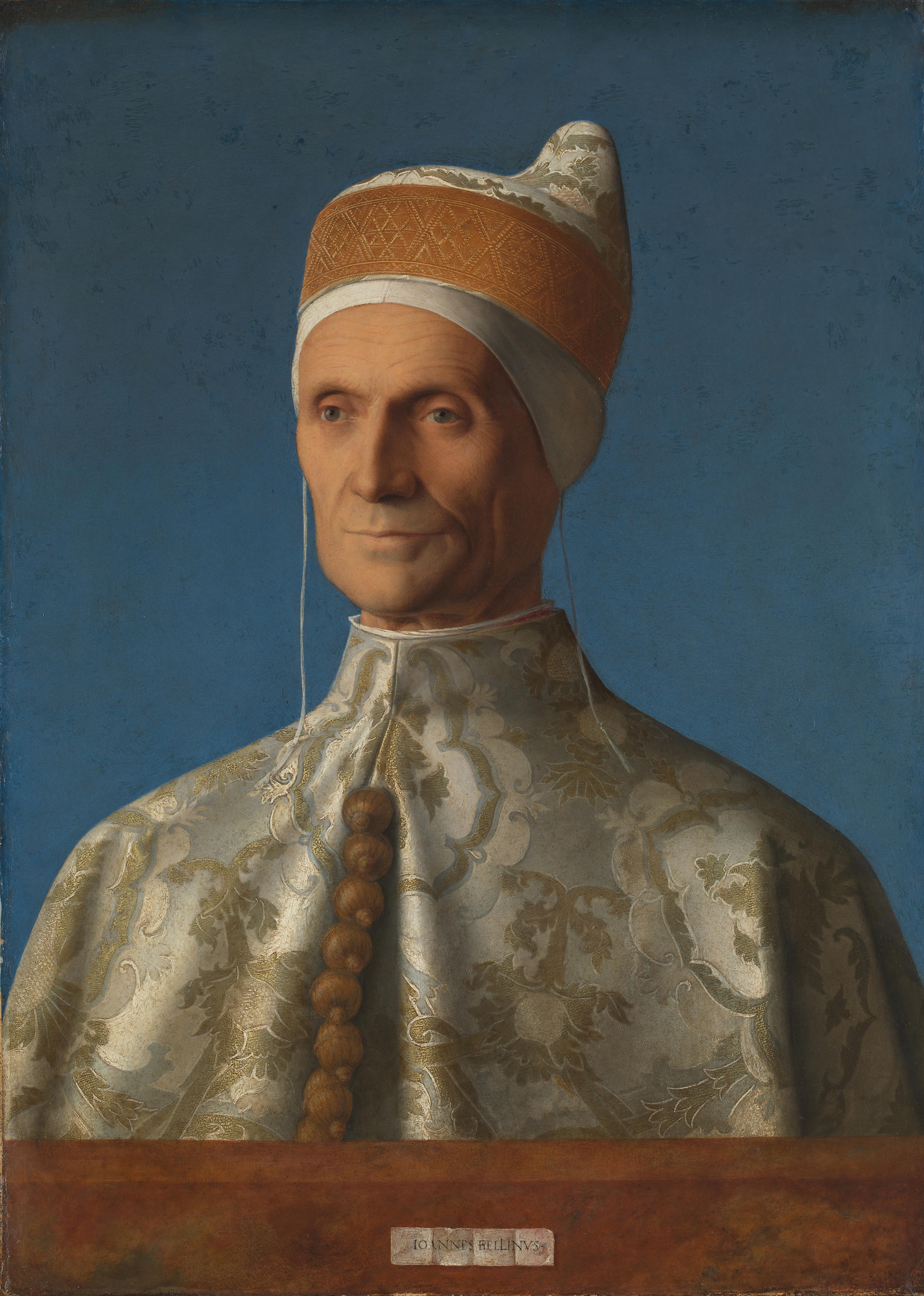
The Venetians under Leonardo Loredano favoured the Mamluks and Ottomans against the Portuguese.

The Mamluks again attempted to secure the help of the Venetians against the Portuguese, and they did intervene by pleading their case with the Pope.

The Venetians, who had been at peace with the Ottomans since the signature of the 1503 Peace Treaty by Andrea Gritti after the Ottoman–Venetian War, continued to secure peace with the Ottomans, and renewed their peace treaty in 1511, leading them to encourage the Ottomans to participate on the Mamluk side in the conflict against the Portuguese.

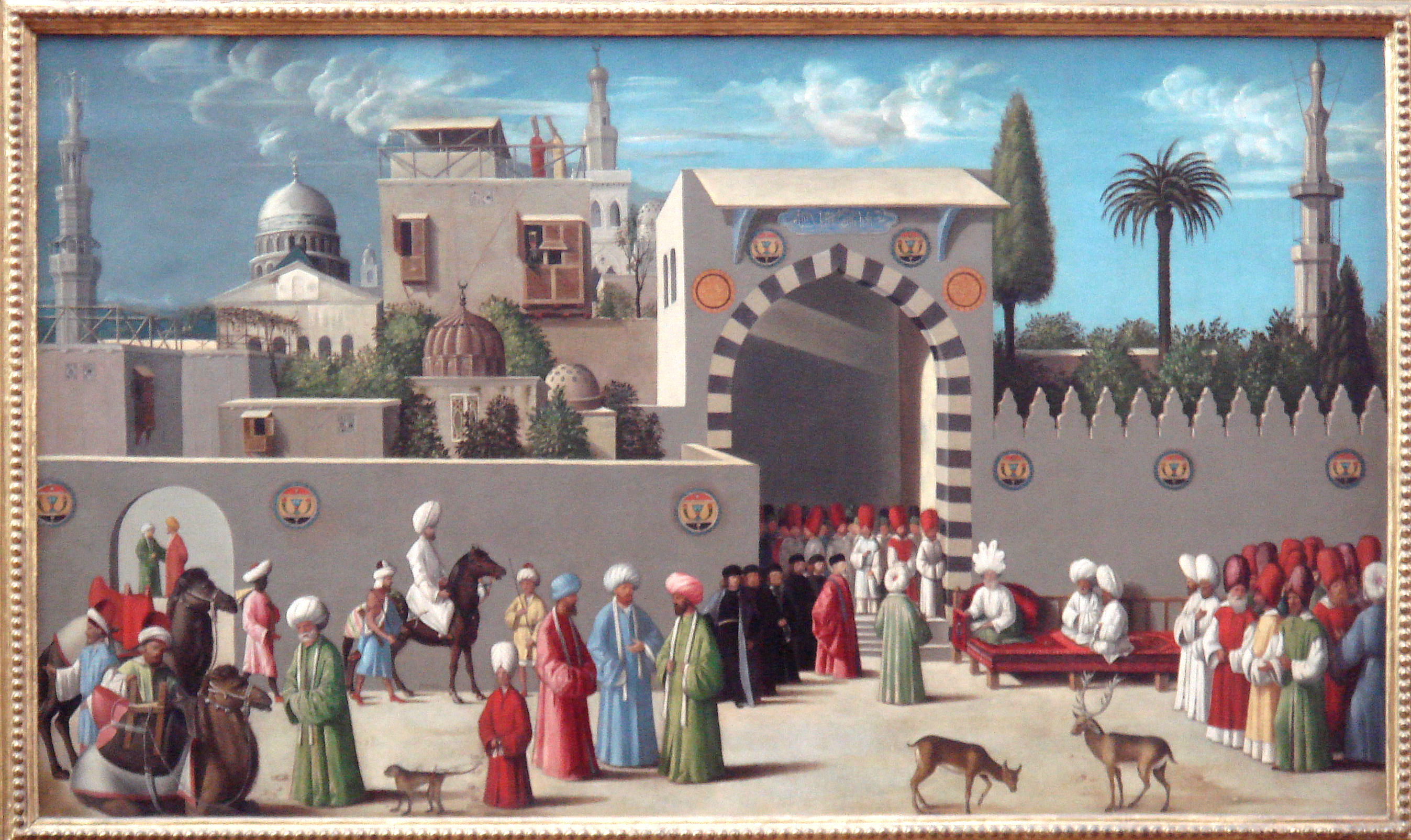
Venetian embassy to the Mamluk Governor in Damascus in 1511, workshop of Giovanni Bellini.

The rapprochement was such that Venice authorized Ottoman provisioning in its Mediterranean ports such as Cyprus. Venice also requested Ottoman support in the War of the League of Cambrai, but in vain.

A Mamluk-Venetian commercial treaty was signed by the ambassador to Cairo Domenico Trevisan in 1513. After that point however, and the reverses of the Mamluks and the Persians against the Ottomans, Venice increasingly favoured a rapprochement with the Ottoman Empire.

== Persian–Portuguese "alliance" ==
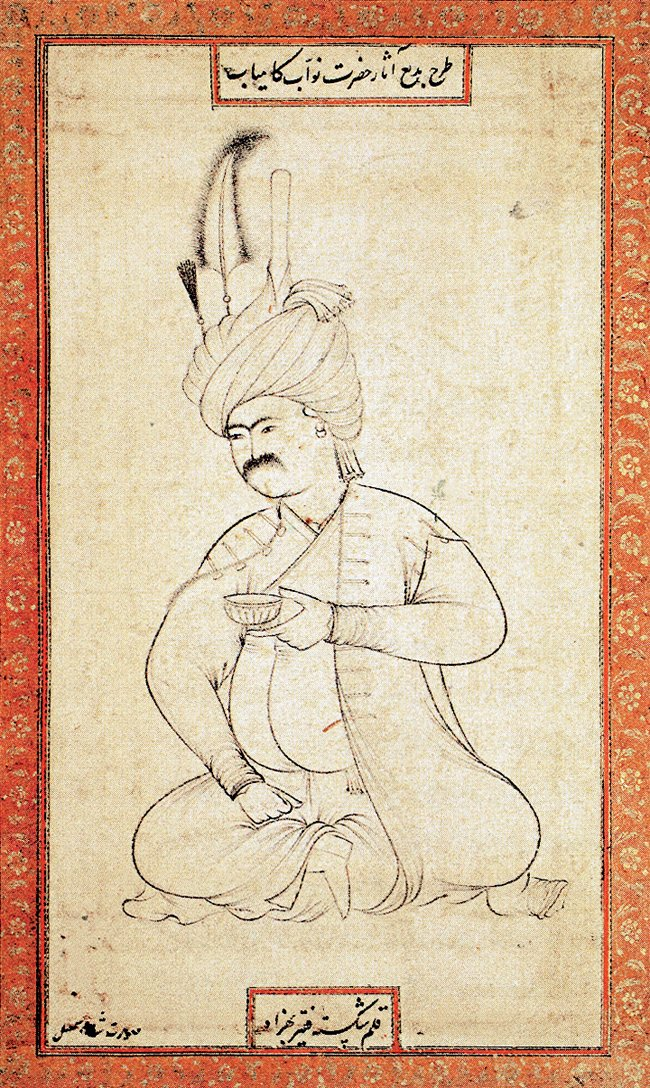
Shah Ismail I

On the other hand, the Portuguese, who feared a new expedition from the Mamluks, organized a rapprochement with Persia, and endeavoured to establish an alliance, that could give bases for the Portuguese on the northern shores of the Indian Ocean and create an eastern threat for the Ottomans and the Mamluks. Albuquerque received an ambassador of Shah Ismail at Goa, and returned a letter as well as an ambassador in the person of Rui Gomes. In the letter to Shah Ismail, Albuquerque proposed a joint attack against the Mamluks and the Ottomans:

And if you desire to destroy the Sultan [Qansuh] by land, you can recount on great assistance from the Armada of the King my Lord by sea, and I believe that with small trouble you must gain the lordship of the city of Cairo and all his kingdoms and dependencies, and thus my Lord can give you great help by sea against the Turks, and thus his fleets by sea and you with your great forces and cavalry by land can combine to inflict great injuries upon them

— Letter from Albuquerque to Shah Ismail.

== Portuguese Red Sea campaign (1513) ==
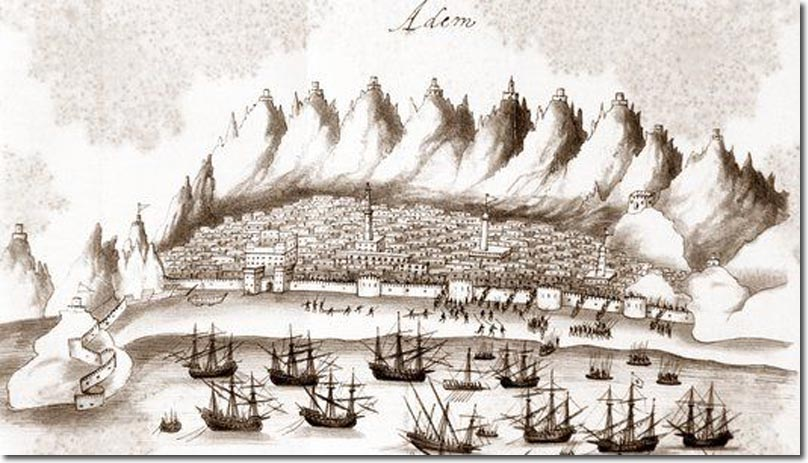
1513 Portuguese attack on Aden, depicted by Gaspar Correia.

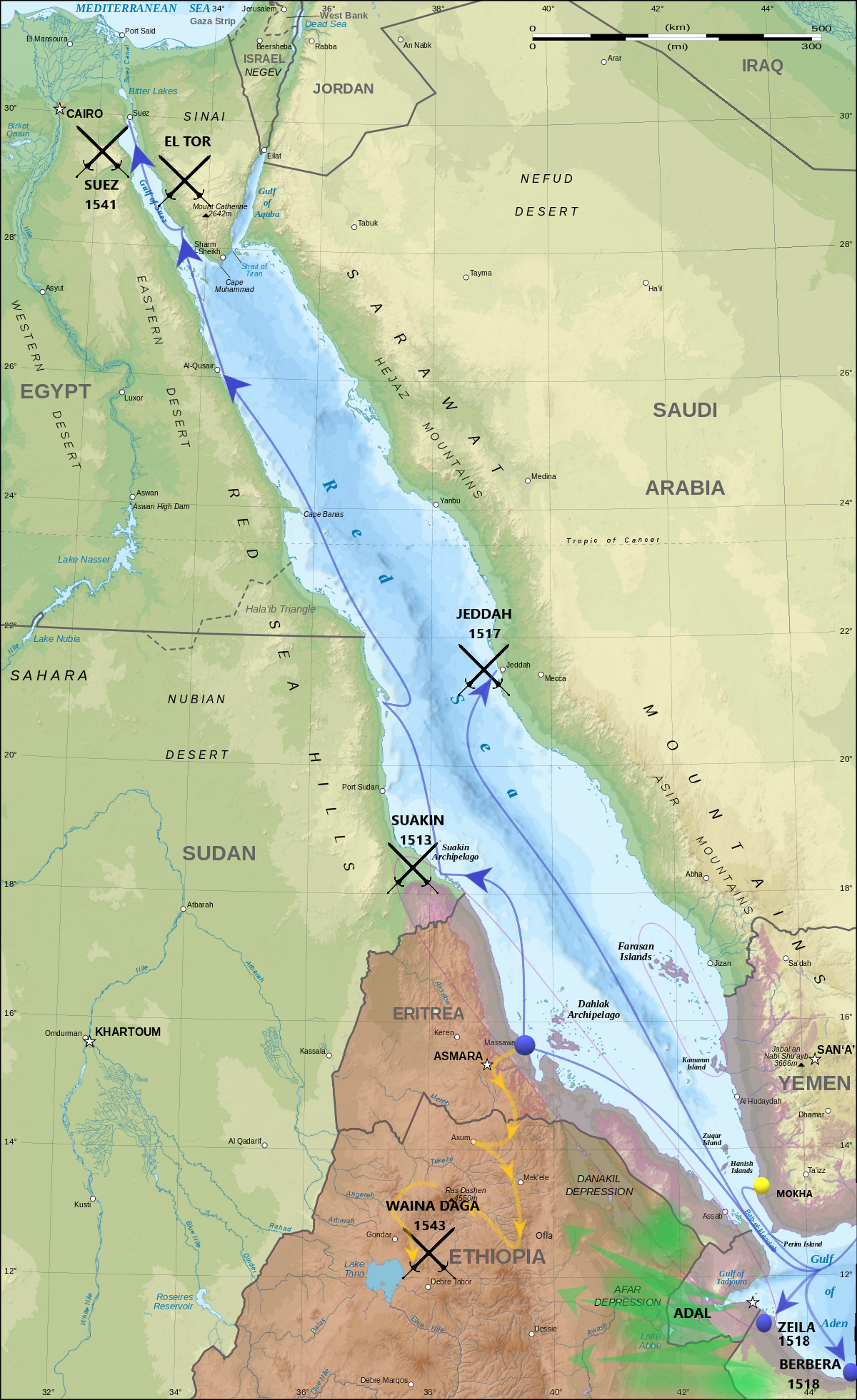
Portuguese raids in the Red Sea

Following their victory at the Battle of Diu and the elimination of rival Muslim fleets in the Indian Ocean, the Portuguese endeavoured to the systematic destruction of Muslim commercial shipping.

In 1513, Albuquerque led a campaign against the Red Sea in order to stop completely Mamluk trade with India, and defeat Mamluk plans to send a fleet to India. On February 7, 1513, he left Goa with 1,700 Portuguese and 1,000 Indian men in 24 ships. Albuquerque landed at Aden on 26 March 1513, at the entrance of the Red Sea and attempted to take the city, but he was repulsed. Sailing into the Red Sea, he destroyed the port of Kamaran (June and July 1513). He failed to sail to Jeddah due to contrary winds, and then withdrew to India after again bombarding Aden.

Albuquerque thus failed to stop the spice trade through the Red Sea and to establish a trade monopoly for the Europe-India spice trade. This campaign however had been a major threat to the Mamluk harbour of Suez and to the holy cities of Mecca and Medina, which put the Mamluk Sultan under tremendous pressure. The Mamluk Sultan Qansuh was thus forced to seek Ottoman assistance, although the Ottomans had been a traditional rival, in his resistance against the Portuguese.

== Red Sea campaigns (1517) ==
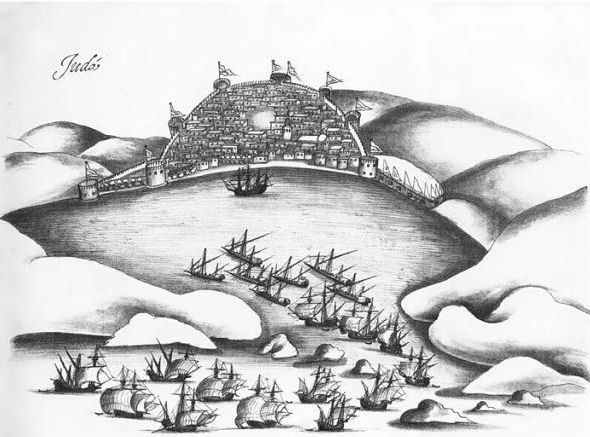
The Mamluks and Ottomans under Selman Reis defended Jeddah against a Portuguese attack in 1517.

In 1514–16 Selman Reis cooperated with the Mamluks against the Portuguese. Selman Reis entered the service of the Mamluks, and led a group of 2,000 armed Levantines, against the wishes of the Ottoman Sultan Selim I, and met with this force with the Sultan Qansuh at Suez in April 1514. Artillery defenses were also established in Jeddah and Alexandria. This concentration on the Portuguese front had the ultimate effect however of weakening the Mamluk strengths that could be put against the Ottomans in the Levant. The investment was huge, as the fleet cost around 400,000 dinars to the Mamluk Sultan.

Following the disruption of the spice trade between India and Mamluk Egypt by the Portuguese, Selman Reis led a Mamluk fleet of 19 ships into the Indian Ocean in 1515. He left Suez leading the fleet on 30 September 1515. The fleet also included 3,000 men, 1,300 of whom were Turkish mercenaries. The fleet built a fortress in Kamaran, but failed to take Yemen and Aden on 17 September 1516. The combined fleet was able to defend Jeddah against the Portuguese in 1517, but by then the war between the Ottomans and the Mamluks was already raging on.

As a consequence, the Portuguese were able to set up trading posts in the Indian subcontinent, and take-over the spice trade to Europe, which had been a major source of revenues for the Mamluk state.

Portuguese naval and war banner featuring the Cross of the Order of Christ.

== Aftermath ==
The Mamluk Empire became financially crippled, and was finally vanquished by the Ottoman Empire under Selim I, on land, in the Ottoman–Mamluk War (1516–17). Cairo was captured by the Ottomans on January 26, 1517, leading to the disintegration of the Mamluk Empire.

The Ottomans, on the other hand, managed to establish a strong presence in the Indian Ocean, which they would further develop during the rest of the century. The Ottomans took up the task of fighting the Portuguese in the Indian Ocean, especially through their admiral Selman Reis, who in 1525 occupied the Aden and Yemen with a fleet of 18 ships and 299 cannons, forcing the Portuguese to retreat. The Ottoman failed however in the 1538 Siege of Diu.

Egypt, on the other hand, lost its status as a great power, and, deprived of the resources of the Indian Ocean trade, essentially faded into the background for the next three centuries.

== See also ==
- Military history of Portugal
- Adil Shahi-Portuguese conflicts
- Gujarati-Portuguese conflicts
- Ottoman–Portuguese conflicts
- Ottoman–Mamluk War (1485–91)
- Ottoman–Mamluk War (1516–17)
- Somali-Portuguese conflicts
- Portuguese Socotra
  - Portuguese conquest of Socotra
- Portuguese conquest of Hormuz
- Portuguese India
