= Capture of Ormuz =

Capture of Ormuz may refer to:

- Capture of Ormuz (1507), Portuguese Afonso de Albuquerque attacking Hormuz Island
- Capture of Ormuz (1622), Anglo-Persian force taking over the Portuguese garrison at Hormuz Island
