= Portuguese Socotra =

Portuguese rule of island

Portuguese Socotra Socotorá Portuguesa (Portuguese)
- 1507–1511
- Flag Coat of arms

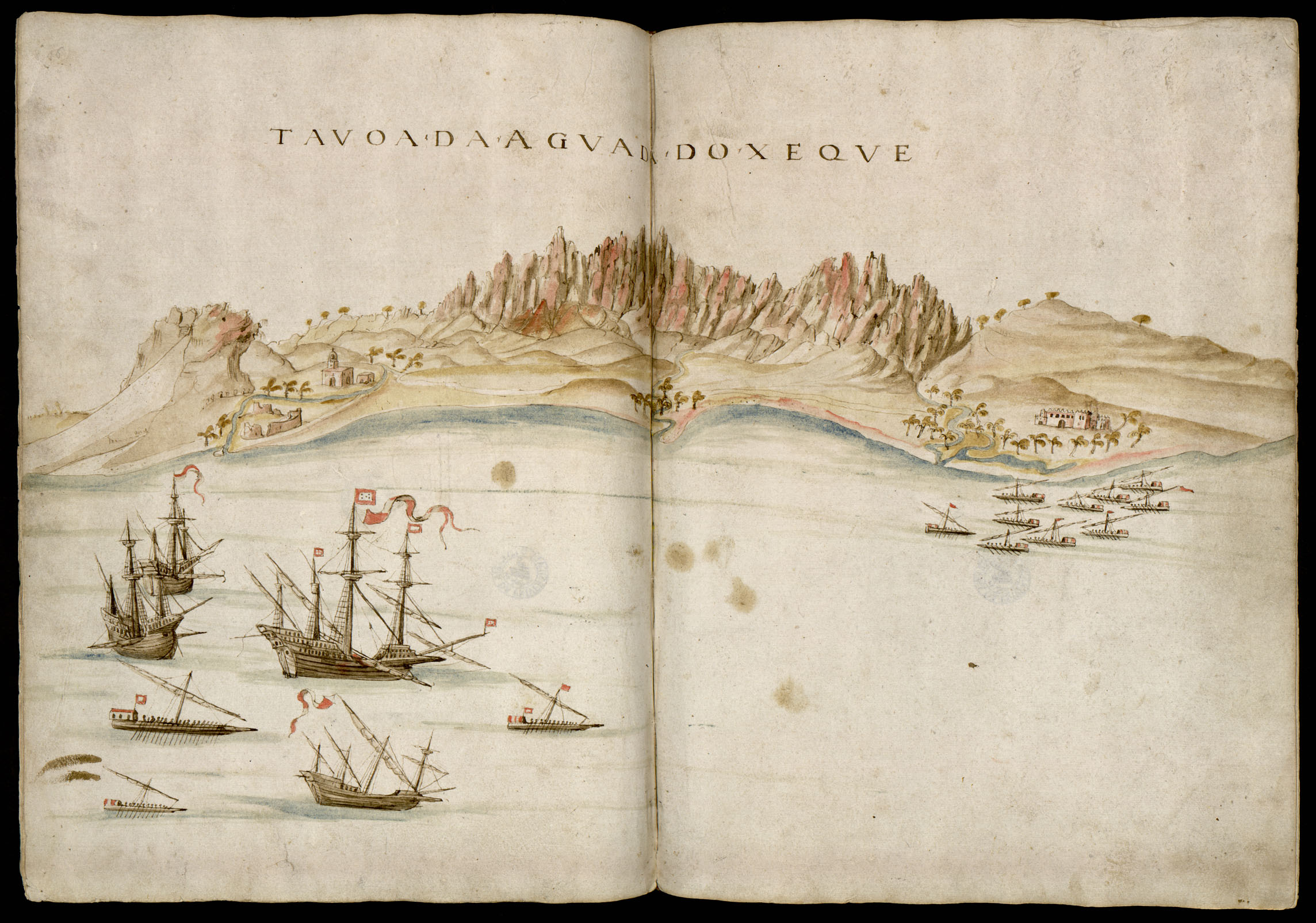
- Portuguese drawing of Socotra
- Status: Colony of the Portuguese Empire
- Capital: Suq
- Official language: Portuguese
- Common languages: Arabic; Soqotri
- Religion: Roman Catholicism; Sunni Islam; Nestorian Christianity
- Government: Absolutist monarchy
- King
  - 1507–1511: Manuel I
- Captain
  - 1507–1509 (first): Afonso de Noronha
  - 1509–1510: Pedro Ferreira
  - 1510–1511 (last): Pedro Correia
- Historical era: Early modern period
  - Captured by Cunha and Albuquerque.: 1507
  - Abandoned by Portugal.: 1511
  - Disestablished: 1511
Preceded by	Succeeded by
Mahra Sultanate	Mahra Sultanate
- Today part of: Yemen

Portuguese Socotra (Portuguese: Socotorá Portuguesa) refers to the period during which the island of Socotra was ruled by the Portuguese Empire. Captured from the Mahra dynasty of Qishn in 1507 by Tristão da Cunha and Afonso de Albuquerque, it was later abandoned in 1511 and it reverted to the rule of Mahra.

== History ==
In the early 16th century Portugal was involved in a war over the control of the Indian Ocean trade, against the Mamluk Sultanate of Egypt, the Zamorin of Calicut and the Republic of Venice. Convinced that Socotra could serve as an ideal base to cut off hostile Muslim shipping sailing between India and the Middle East through the Red Sea, King Manuel of Portugal ordered that the island be captured, a fort built on it and a fleet stationed there. Socotra harboured a community of Nestorian Christians, which the Portuguese also sought to relieve from Muslim rule.

On April 1506 Tristão da Cunha was dispatched from Lisbon as captain-major of a fleet of 14 ships. Five were under the command of Afonso de Albuquerque, nominated as captain-major of the seas of Arabia. The expedition charted Madagascar along the way, and regrouped in east-Africa waiting for the correct season to proceed.

The Portuguese reached Suq in April 1507 and found a well-fortified Muslim fort built by the Mahra of Qishn in Yemen on the Arabian mainland, which was used to collect tribute from the surrounding inhabitants. The commander of the Arab fort, sheikh Khawadjah Ibrahim, son of the sultan of Qishn, had 130 warriors and was offered the chance to capitulate peacefully but he refused. The fort was assaulted the following morning by two squadrons under the command of Tristão da Cunha and Afonso de Albuquerque, Khawadjah Ibrahim perishing in the struggle.

=== Portuguese Socotra 1507-1511 ===
The captured fort was christened São Miguel. It had an inner courtyard, keep, and reservoirs equipped with pipes to drain the water. It was found to be only large enough to house half of the 200 men garrison, hence it was remade, while part of the soldiers lived in houses built nearby. The mosque within it was converted to a chapel under the invocation of Nossa Senhora da Piedade or Our Lady of Victory. Dom Afonso de Noronha was nominated as its captain, Fernão Jácome de Tomar as alcaide-mor, and Pero Vaz de Orta as royal factor, in charge of overseeing trade.

The Nestorian Socotrans showed the Portuguese appreciation for relieving them of Muslim rule. Friar Francisco do Loureiro and a few other Franciscans baptised a number of the inhabitants amid great celebrations. They built a church dedicated to Saint Thomas the Apostle and a monastery in the town, the first erected by the Portuguese east of the Cape of Good Hope. Afonso de Albuquerque then redistributed the palm groves which had belonged to the resident Muslims and the mosque to the Christians. Tristão da Cunha left with his ships to Portuguese India in August 10 1507. Albuquerque departed ten days later to conquer the Kingdom of Hormuz in the Persian Gulf.

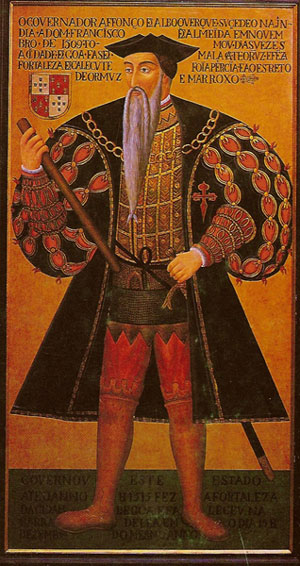
Afonso de Albuquerque.

Conditions on Socotra proved less advantageous than anticipated. The island was remote, the climate harsh, and foodstuffs scarce, while the native Socotrans and local Arabs frequently clashed with the Portuguese garrison.

Having been promoted to governor of India in December 1509, Afonso de Albuquerque dispatched three ships to evacuate Socotra, when no more than 120 men remained.

=== After 1511 ===
Once the Portuguese left, the Banu Afrar of Qishn retook control of Socotra and it would remain in their possession until the 19th century. The Sultans of Qishn became close partners of the Portuguese, to counter-balance the growing power of the Ottoman Empire, who captured Egypt in 1517 and Aden in 1538. The island continued to be a frequent port of call for Portuguese merchants or warships looking to obtain water or information on enemy movements whilst operating in the region, in the 16th and 17th centuries. In 1541, an armada commanded by the Governor of India Estevão da Gama anchored at Socotra on their way to attack Ottoman positions in the Red Sea. While there, Dom João de Castro produced a number of sketches and views of the island for navigational purposes. In 1548, the Portuguese expelled the Ottomans from Qishn, returning it to its native rulers. Camões, considered the greatest Portuguese poet, passed by Socotra, and the harsh climate of the island inspired him to write a poem called Junto a Um Seco, Estéril e Fero Monte ("By a Dry, Barren and Fearsome Hill").

The island was often visited by Christian missionaries, either by their own means or as ambassadors of the Portuguese governor at Goa. In 1542 for example, the Jesuit Francis Xavier called on the island while on his way to India and he wrote about the land and the traditions of its inhabitants.

In the 19th century, a large number of inhabitants in the hill country still claimed descent from the Portuguese.

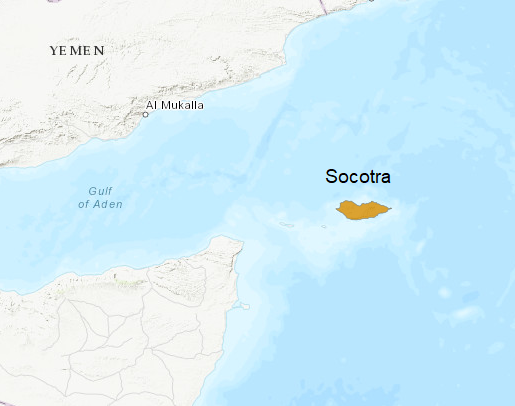
Position of Socotra relative to the African and Arabian mainland.

== List of captains ==
- Dom Afonso de Noronha (April 1507 – November 1509)
- Pedro Ferreira (November 1509 – died in August 1510)
- Pedro Correia (August 1510 – 1511)

== See also ==
- Portuguese India
- Mamluk-Portuguese conflicts
- Ottoman-Portuguese conflicts (1538-1560)
