= Banca Rasini =

Italian bank

Banca Rasini was an Italian bank in Milan, founded in the 1950s and acquired by Banca Popolare di Lodi in 1992. Its main claim to fame is the presence among its customers of Pippo Calò, Totò Riina, Bernardo Provenzano and Silvio Berlusconi. Silvio's father Luigi Berlusconi was an employee of the bank.

With the Michele Sindona trial linking the bank to organized crime, it ended up being mentioned by The New York Times journalist Nick Tosches in his book Power On Earth.

== History ==
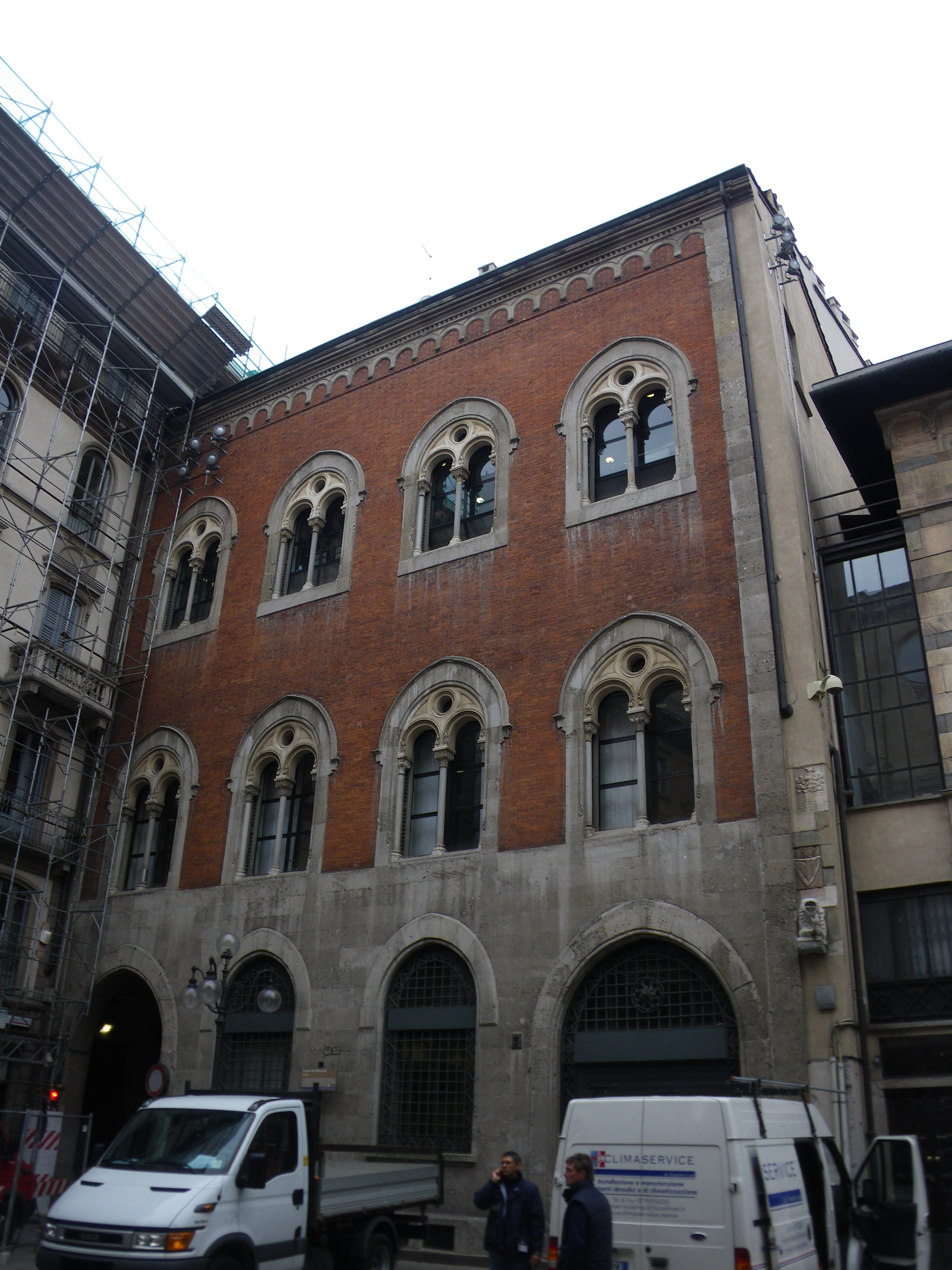

Banca Rasini Sas di Rasini, Ressi & C. was founded at the beginning of 1950s by Carlo Rasini, Gian Angelo Rasini, Enrico Ressi, Giovanni Locatelli, Angela Maria Rivolta and Giuseppe Azzaretto. The initial capital was 100 million lire. Capital from Lombardy and Palermo then helped the bank grow.

In 1992, Banca Rasini was incorporated into the Banca Popolare di Lodi, but it was only in 1998 that the Palermo Public Prosecutor's Office seized all the bank's archives. The Palermo judges, also following the revelations of Michele Sindona (interview in 1985 with an American journalist, Nick Tosches) and other "repentants", indicate the Rasini bank itself as involved in money laundering of mafia origin. Among the account holders of the bank there was also Vittorio Mangano, the mafioso who worked in Silvio Berlusconi's villa from 1973 to 1975.
