= Francesco Teldi =

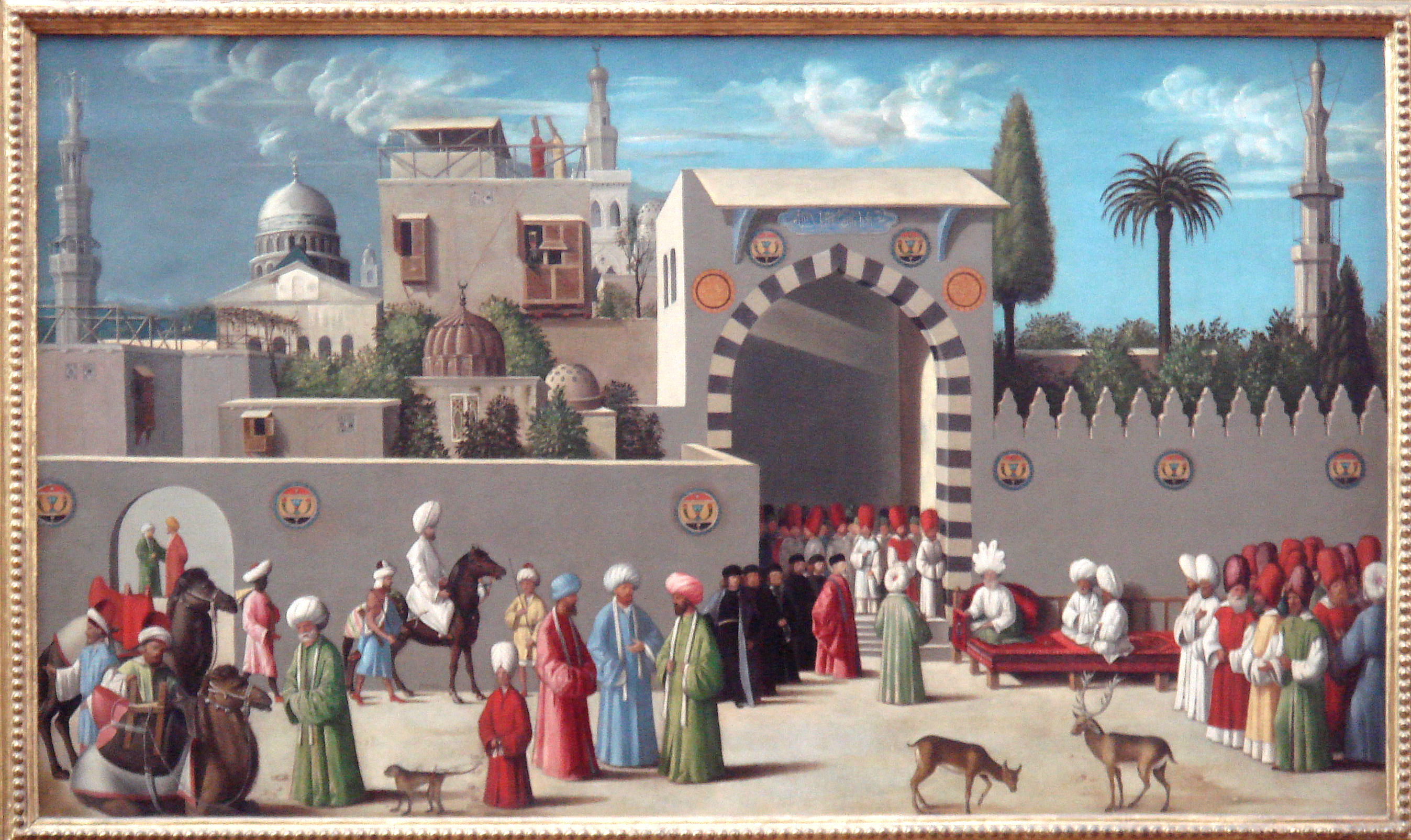
Venetian embassy to the Mamluks Governor in Damascus in 1511, workshop of Giovanni Bellini.

Francesco Teldi was a Venetian trader and ambassador who negotiated with the Egyptian Mamluks in the early 16th century for joint action against the expansion of the Portuguese in the Indian Ocean, during the Portuguese-Mamluk War.

In 1504, the Venetians, who shared common interests with the Mamluks in the spice trade and desired to eliminate the Portuguese challenge if possible, sent Francesco Teldi, posing as a jewel buyer, as envoy to Cairo. Francesco Teldi tried to find a level of cooperation between the two realms, encouraging the Mamluks to block Portuguese navigations. The Venetians claimed they could not intervene directly, and encouraged the Mamluk Sultan Qansuh al-Ghuri to take action by getting into contact with Indian rulers of Kingdom of Cochin and Kingdom of Cannanore to entice them not to trade with the Portuguese, and the King of Calicut and Sultan of Cambay to fight against them. Some sort of alliance was thus concluded between the Venetians and the Mamluks against the Portuguese.

Francesco Teldi was apparently the owner of a unique painting of Cairo, which may have inspired a painting of Cairo by Gentile Bellini in 1493.
