= Portuguese conquest of Hormuz =

Battle in 1507

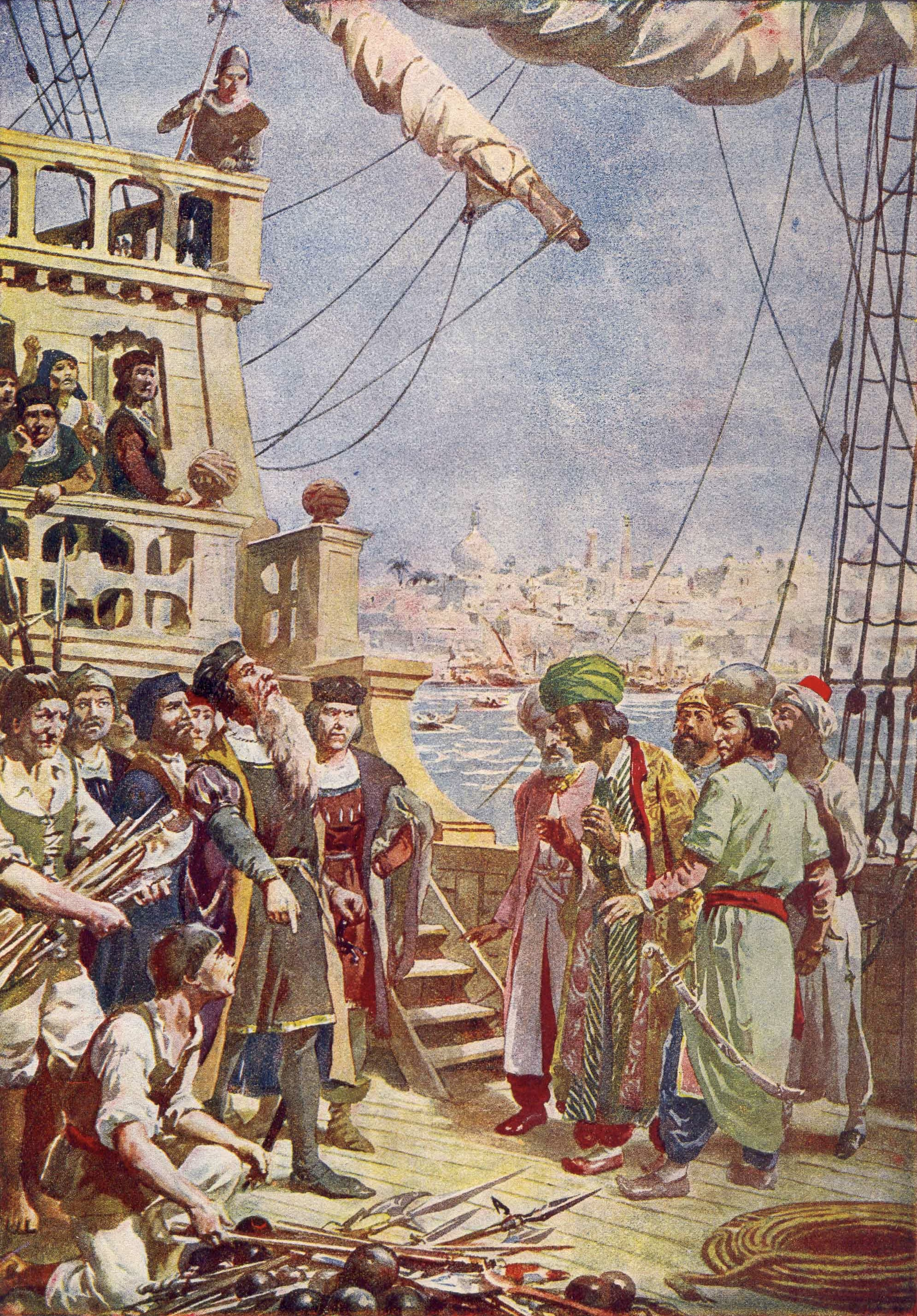
- Albuquerque and the Emissaries of the King of Hormuz by Alfredo Roque Gameiro
Date	26 September 1507
Location	Hormuz, present-day Iran
Result	Portuguese victory
Territorial changes	Capture of Hormuz by Portugal

Belligerents
Portuguese Empire	Kingdom of Hormuz

Commanders and leaders
(Portuguese Empire) Afonso de Albuquerque	Hwaga Ata

Strength
460 men 6 naus	30,000 men 400 ships

Casualties and losses
11 wounded	900 dead

The Portuguese conquest of Hormuz occurred in the early 16th century when Afonso de Albuquerque conquered the Kingdom of Hormuz and established fort Nossa Senhora da Conceição on the Island of Hormuz. Although an attempt in 1507 failed, the Portuguese succeeded in taking over Hormuz in 1515.

The campaign against Hormuz was part of a plan by king Manuel of Portugal to control the Indian Ocean trade and thwart hostile Muslim competitors, by capturing Aden to control trade through the Red Sea; Hormuz, to control trade through the Persian Gulf; and Malacca to control trade passing through the Malacca Straits.

The capture of Hormuz gave Portugal control of trade and shipping passing through the Persian Gulf for over a century.

== Background ==
The Portuguese had reports suggesting that the island of Socotra was inhabited by Nestorian Christians and might prove useful in suppressing hostile Muslim shipping in the Indian Ocean. Socotra was then a dominion of the Banu Afrar clan of Qishn, in mainland Arabia, whom the Portuguese would refer to in the 16th century as Fartaques.

In April 1506, two fleets totaling 16 ships, under the overall command of Tristão da Cunha, were dispatched from Lisbon to capture Socotra and establish on it a fort. Cunha was assisted by Afonso de Albuquerque, who was to remain at Socotra and patrol the seas against hostile Muslim navigation, explore the Arabian coast and take points deemed useful, such as Hormuz.

=== The capture of Socotra, 1507 ===
After a long journey of 12 months, 6 months longer than predicted, the fleet finally landed at Suq in Socotra in April 1507. After a brief but stiff struggle, the Portuguese took over the local fort, which was renamed São Miguel, and a tribute in goats was imposed on the population to sustain it. On the 27th of July, Tristão da Cunha proceeded to India, leaving Albuquerque with six ships on the island: those of his squadron and João da Nova on the great carrack Flor de la Mar. Nova was to return to Portugal at that time but since a ship had straggled in east Africa on the way to Socotra, his services were commandeered, despite his protests. Albuquerque confiscated the palm-groves belonging to the Muslims and redistributed them among the native Nestorian Christians.

Albuquerque no doubt realized the inadequacy of Socotra to serve as a military base and the need for his forces to capture the heavily fortified city of Aden.After such a long journey, that had taken sixteen months instead of six, he had lost many men to disease, his ships and equipment were in need of repairs and his food supplies and ammunition had almost run out. Socotra proved to be much poorer and remote than the Portuguese had anticipated, so the expedition soon ran the risk of starvation. Food supplies would last for no more than another week.

Malindi, Mozambique or any other friendly base were at least a thousand miles away, while the surrounding coasts were ruled by hostile Arabs. Because of this, after gathering a war-council with his officers Albuquerque set sail to the Strait of Hormuz on 10 August 1507 where, hopefully, he could acquire supplies by any means necessary, and accomplish his secret instructions to capture Hormuz.

When I saw myself this ruined, and the fleet lacking supplies, and a hundred and twenty men sick, lacking whatsoever to feed them, and a hundred men that the king had us stationed there, I was forced to change course, so as not to lose the fleet and the fortress, and discard the journey to Cambay, and seek the Strait of Hormuz to find supplies, and die like knights, rather than starving little by little, till we wrecked the ships.

— Letter of Afonso de Albuquerque, 27 of October 1507.

On the 14th of August, Albuquerque's fleet called at Khuriya Muriya islands, where they were nearly wrecked due to the thick fog and because the pilots were off their reckonings. The fleet then anchored off Ras al Hadd, where they found thirty or forty fishing-ships from Ormuz.

=== Portuguese conquest of Oman ===
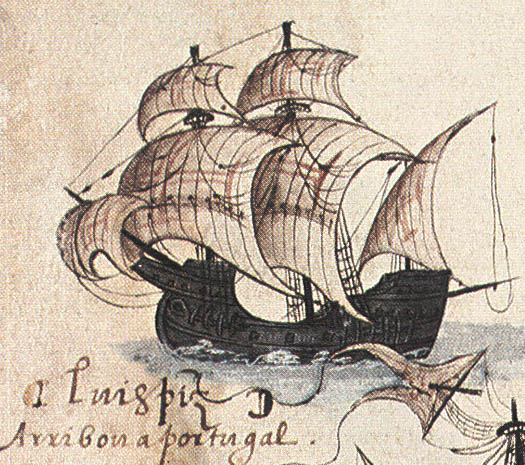
A Portuguese carrack

In the early 16th century, the coastal cities of Oman were a dependency of the Kingdom of Hormuz, ruled by governors. On 22 August 1507, the squadron of Albuquerque reached Qalhat, a city the Portuguese estimated as roughly the size of Santarém in Portugal. It was an important port that exported large quantities of horses and dates to India. Its governor had heard of the capture of Socotra, so he preferred to negotiate and exchange hostages and offer provisions, mostly bales of dates.

As the loading of provisions was made at night, only when the fleet was underway again did the Portuguese realize that most of the dates were rotten. Qurayyat further north erected stockades and attempted to resist, but the town was assaulted and sacked. Muscat was then governed by a eunuch and former slave of the king of Hormuz, who surrendered to Albuquerque, but the garrison overruled his decision, for which the town was likewise sacked.

Sohar was then the only town in Oman protected by a small fort, but it promptly capitulated at the sight of the Portuguese. The town was spared, gifts were exchanged, and in return for a pledge of vassalage, its governor was entrusted with a Portuguese flag to hoist, and allowed to keep the annual tribute that he already paid to the king of Hormuz for himself and his troops ahead of the fort. The governor offered a signed document declaring the towns allegiance and the terms of surrender. Albuquerque personally offered the governor a scarlet cloak and a silver basin, while the other captains offered diverse gifts.

Khor Fakkan was sighted on the 22nd of September, but it was also sacked. At Khor Fakkan, the Portuguese captured an elder who seemed so distinguished that he was brought before Albuquerque. Speaking courteous words, he claimed to Albuquerque that his army "seemed to him to exceed that of Alexander". When questioned how he knew of Alexander, the man offered Albuquerque a crimson book written in Persian of the life of Alexander. Most likely, this was the famous Eskandar Nameh written by Nizami Ganjavi. Albuquerque "prized it more than anything else".

== First conquest of Hormuz, 1507 ==
Portuguese naval and war banner featuring the Cross of the Order of Christ, used in the 16th and 17th centuries

Late in the evening of September 25, 1507, the Portuguese fleet approached the harbour of Hormuz, adorned with flags and salvoing the city for half an hour. They were received with an intense sound of trumpets, cymbals and shouting, that impaired hearing on the fleet. It did not impress Albuquerque, who directed his vessels to anchor in the middle of the crowded harbour.

News of the Portuguese conquest of Oman sowed considerable distress within the city and rumour had spread that the Portuguese even devoured people. Likely for this reason, Albuquerque was greeted by no emissaries, with whom he could engage in diplomatic relations. In such case, he summoned the captain of the largest vessel in the harbor – an 800 long tons (810 t) Gujarati trade ship – to his ship instead, to act as a conveyor of his intentions to the sovereign of Hormuz, threatening to sink it if the captain did not comply. He declared to have come with orders from King Manuel of Portugal to vassalize Hormuz and take it under his protection, but he offered the city the chance to capitulate bloodlessly.

Hormuz was then ruled not by its sovereign, the young fifteen year-old king Seyf Ad-Din, but by its powerful old vizier, the Bengali eunuch Cogeatar (Hwaga Ata), who proved unintimidated by the comparatively small fleet. He expressed to Albuquerque his willingness to negotiate and would authorize his soldiers to come ashore peacefully on leave if they wished, a ruse intended to allow Cogeatar to get an idea of their numbers. Albuquerque rejected the offer, though the interpreter Gaspar Rodrigues was ferried ashore with a companion to buy food. He issued an ultimatum to have a definitive reply ready by 8 o'clock of the next day.

The bulk of the Hormuzi fleet was away by then but it was recalled and it arrived at night. During the night, the Portuguese could hear men being ferried onto the ships and barricades erected, revealing to them the vizier's intention to resist. Albuquerque gathered a war-council with his officers, in which many denounced the Hormuz campaign as a mistake, but the determination of the Portuguese commander convinced everyone to fight. On shore Cogeatar gave out orders to capture as many Portuguese alive as possible, as he intended to press them into his service.

=== Battle ===
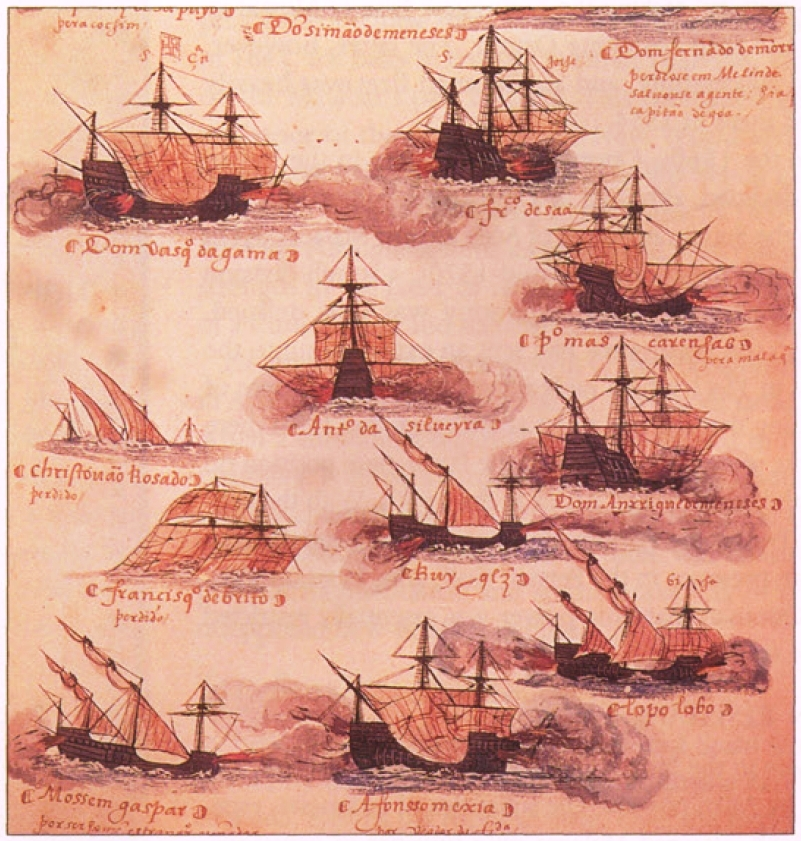
Portuguese naus and war-caravels

The Portuguese were surrounded by some 50−60 large armed merchant ships on the landward side and somewhere between 120 and 200 light oarvessels on the seaward side. Albuquerque made no attempts to escape this encirclement; he would instead take advantage of the excessive number of enemy vessels specifically to allow the artillery to fire for greater effect.

When the following day broke the larger vessels could be seen taking positions away from the Portuguese. Signalling his squadron to follow, Albuquerque positioned his ship close to the great Gujarati ship. Cannon were in evidence and both swords as well as polearms could be sighted as they gleamed under the sun. As negotiations broke down, Albuquerque's flagship Cirne opened fire, and the rest of the fleet followed suit.

When I saw that the solution was to fight, I wanted to be the first to begin and so I waited for my ships and informed the captains of my decisions and of what each one had to do. Since our ships were very high-sided and our men were already at their posts, I ordered them all, including my ship, to fire their large cannon. Everyone did this and, with the first shots of the large cannon, we sent two ships to the bottom, with many of their finest armed men and many swords with silver hilts and shining weapons. Most of the men on these two ships were drowned.

— Afonso de Albuquerque

Volleys were exchanged between the Hormuzi fleet and the Portuguese, with a clear advantage to the latter, and large clouds of smoke formed around the ships, greatly impairing visibility. The battle caused panic among the civilians within the city, while some observed from the beaches. Some were killed by stray cannonballs, and scattered.

The Hormuzi light-oar ships, carrying a great number of mercenary Persian bowmen, maneuvered to attack the Portuguese fleet en masse. At this point, the Portuguese experienced some difficulties due to their lack of personnel, but the compact group of shallow enemy vessels made for an ideal target for Portuguese gunners: about a dozen were sunk and many more disabled, thus obstructing the path of the ones following.

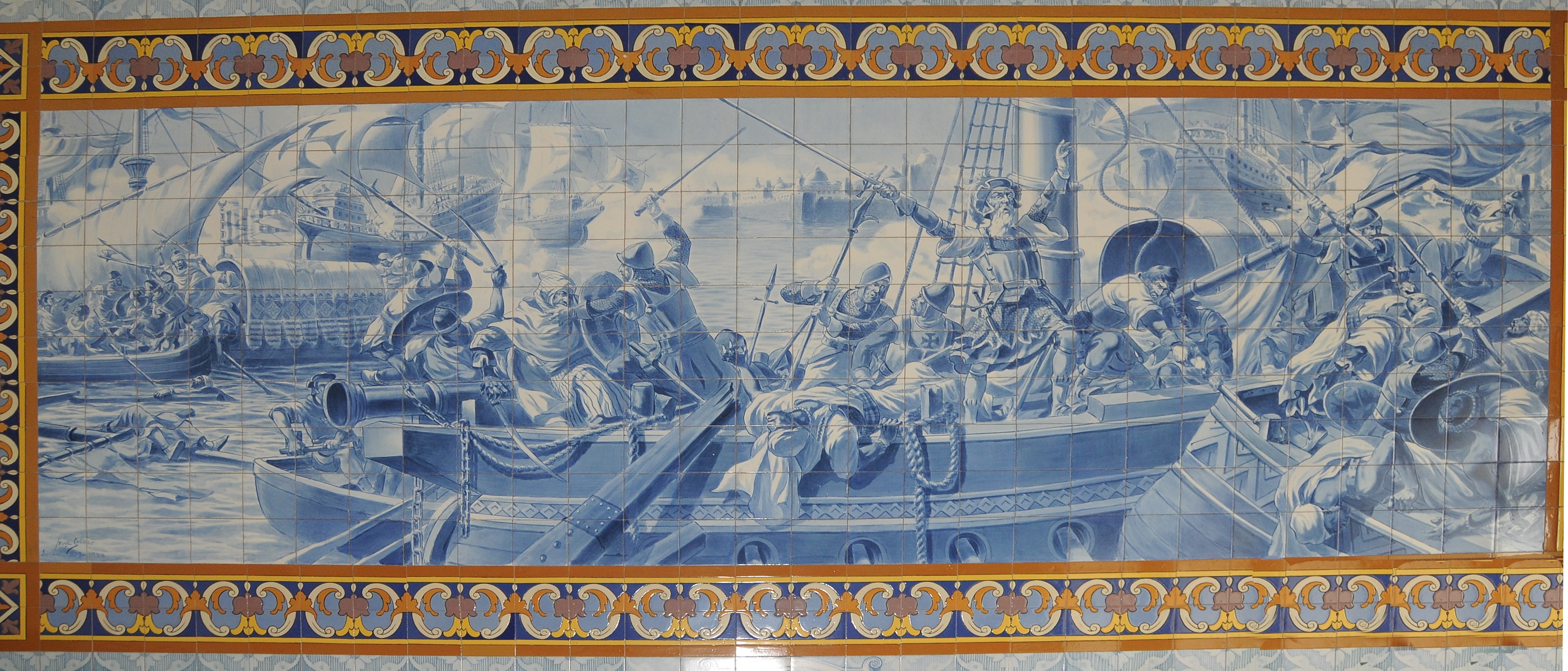
A Portuguese azulejos tile panel depicting the battle at Hormuz.

As confusion set in amongst the Hormuzis, the Portuguese passed on the offensive: Albuquerque had his ship grapple the great carrack of Gujarat, which was boarded by 20 men and captured after a stiff fight. Most ships were captured or burned. Albuquerque staged a landing by the shipyards and began setting fire to the outskirts of Hormuz. Yet he did not wish to assault such a large city with so few men, and had them reembark. The vizier, Cogeatar, feared a Portuguese assault, so he raised a white flag over the royal palace. A Tunisian envoy was dispatched to the Portuguese flagship requesting peace, and Albuquerque promptly accepted the capitulation.

=== Mutiny ===
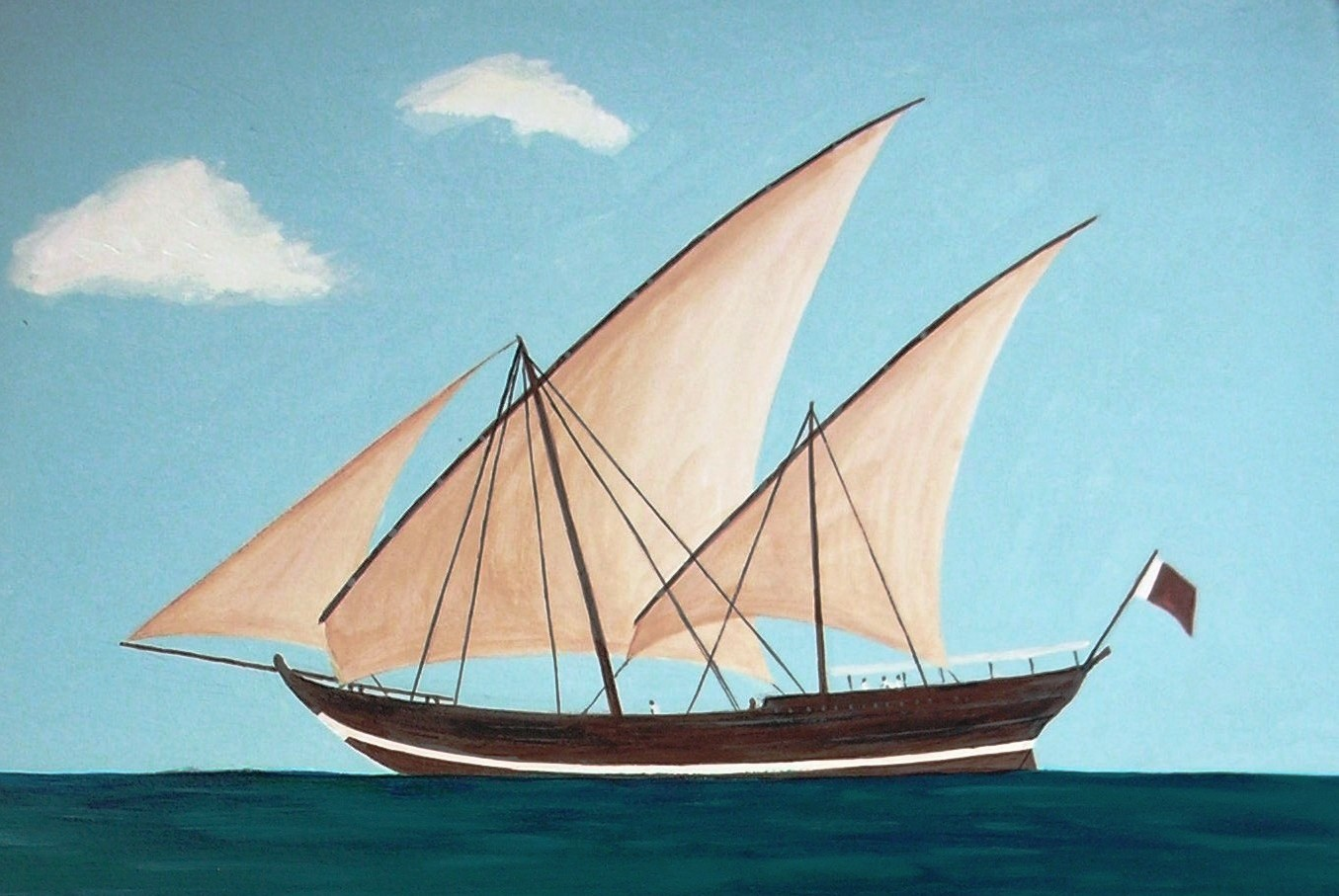
The vessels of Hormuz were probably similar to the Arabian baghlah

After long negotiations, on October 10, Afonso de Albuquerque met with the King of Hormuz Seyf Ad-Din, the vizier Cogeatar, and his right-hand man Rais Nureddin Fali, to sign the terms of capitulation: They consisted of a tribute worth 15,000 ashrafi (a Persian coin worth 400 reis), Portuguese exemption from paying customs dues, and the right to erect a fortress on the island, in exchange for allowing the king to keep his position under Portuguese military protection, while the merchants had the vessels captured in the battle returned to them. The conditions were inscribed on two separate scrolls, one in Arabic chiselled on gold leaf, another in Persian inscribed on paper in letters of gold and blue.

Albuquerque ordered his soldiers to set about erecting the fort on the northernmost tip of the island in turns, and every night the Portuguese would reembark before landing the following morning, to avoid revealing how few the Portuguese actually were. Every day the Portuguese troops landed with different sets of arms and armour to elude the Hormuzis of their few numbers. This ruse worked; Cogeatar estimated the strength of the Portuguese to be 1,200 men. Hormuzi stonemasons were employed, and the Portuguese soldiers participated in the construction of the fortress with no regard to rank. This astonished the Hormuzis, as they were unaccustomed to seeing fighting men engage in menial work. At the same time, the ships were careened.

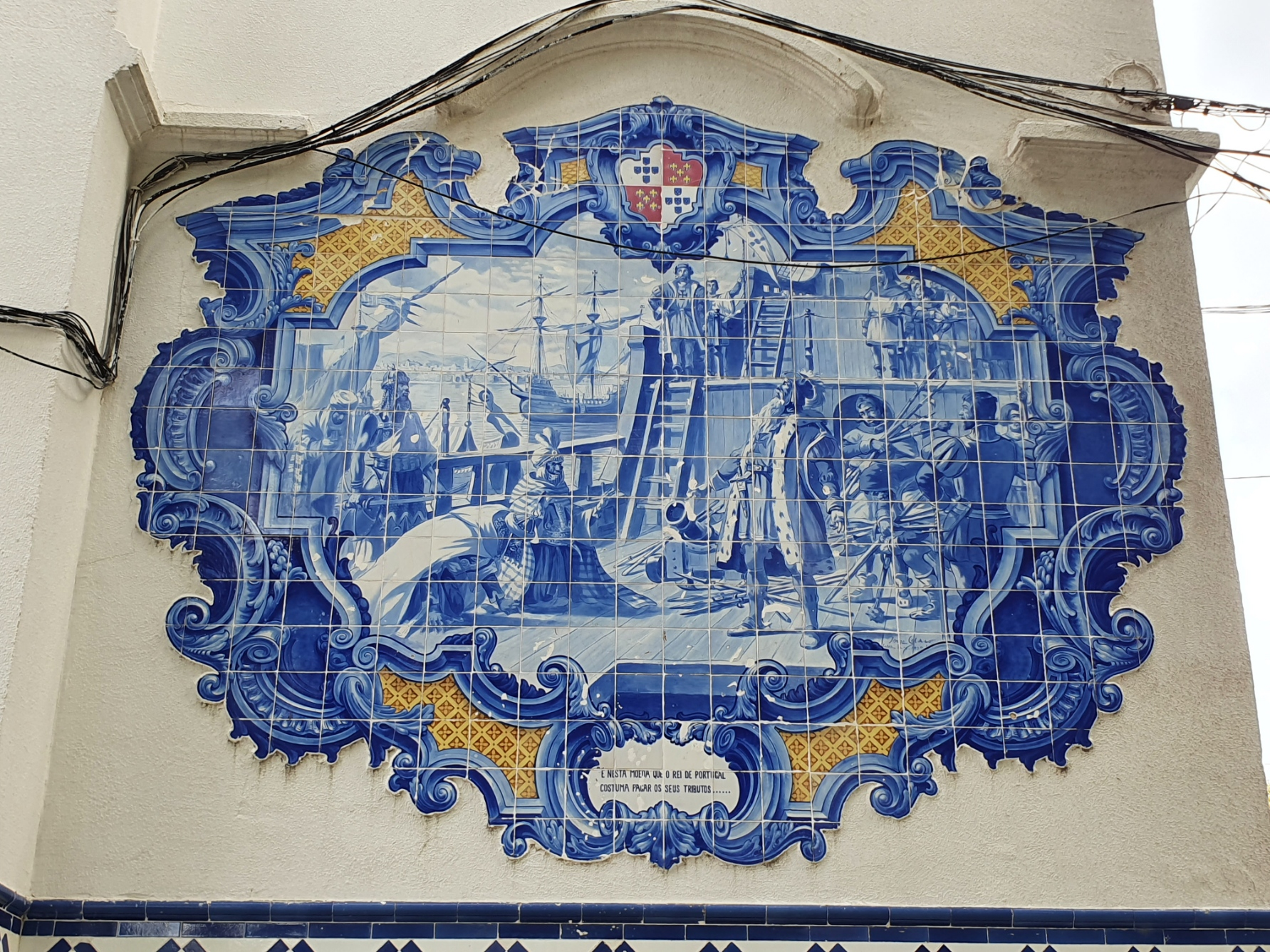
A commemorative tile panel in Portugal depicting the episode between Albuquerque and the Persian envoys. The caption reads: "This is the currency with which the king of Portugal normally pays his tribute..."

Hormuz was a tributary state of Persia, and obligated to pay a tribute once a year. In a famous episode, Albuquerque was confronted by two Persian envoys who demanded the payment of the tribute from him instead. Albuquerque had them delivered bullets, cannonballs, and arrows, retorting that such was the "currency" struck in Portugal to pay tribute. The reply reached Shah Ismail, who came to admire Albuquerque.

Yet, the construction of the fortress under the harsh Hormuzi climate raised grave complaints and disagreements among the Portuguese captains who contested Albuquerque's decision of lingering on Hormuz. In December, four sailors deserted to Cogeatar and informed him of the true numbers of the Portuguese as well as the dissent among their ranks, and by the end of January 1508, captains Afonso Lopes da Costa, António do Campo, and Manuel Teles Barreto deserted to Cochin, in India, with their vessels. Realizing the weakness of his position, on February 8 so too did Albuquerque depart from Hormuz.

=== Socotra ===
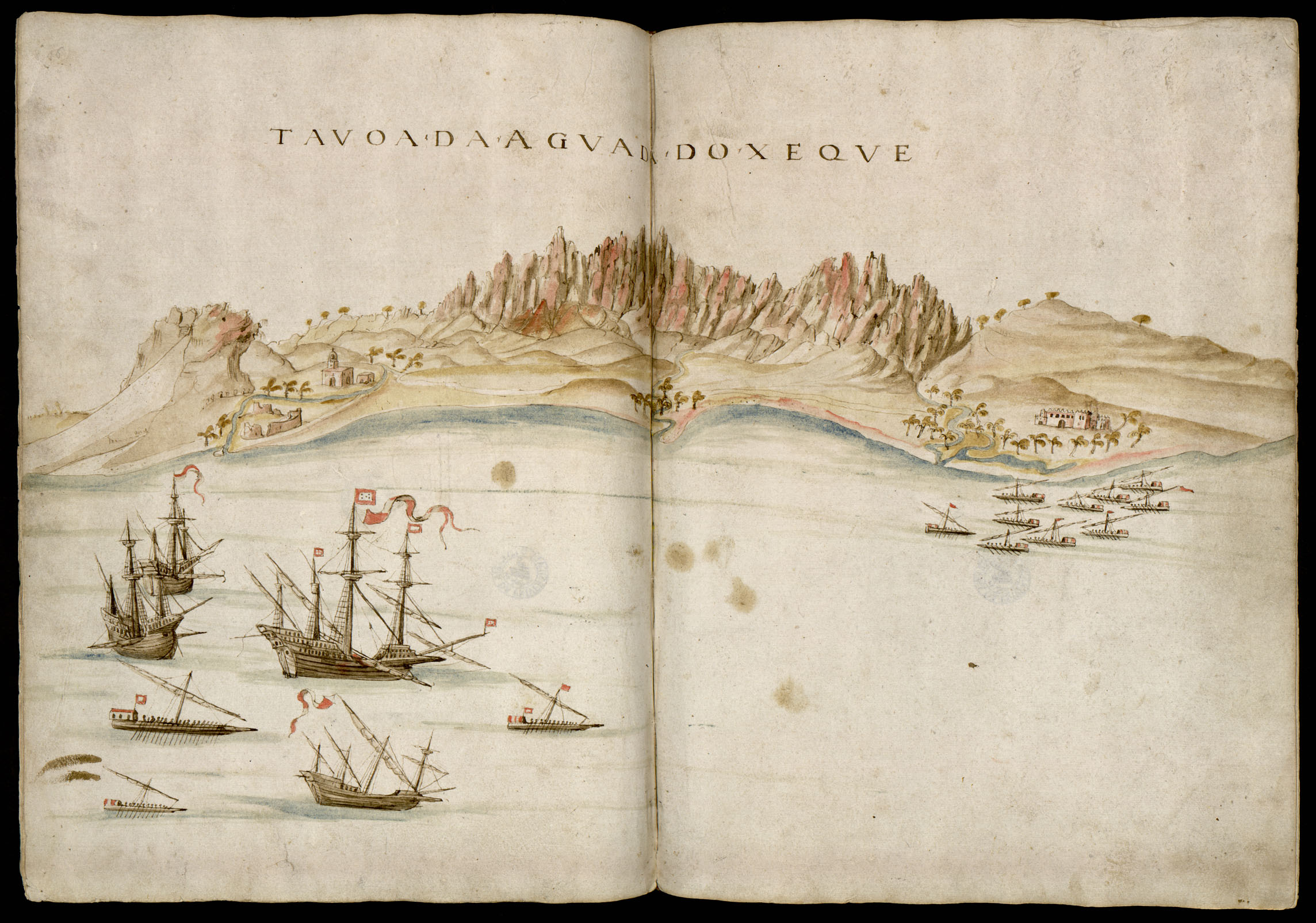
A Portuguese sketch of Socotra, 1541

João da Nova returned with his vessel, the Flor do Mar to India, while Albuquerque returned to Socotra with Francisco de Távora, where he found the Portuguese garrison starving. From there, Francisco de Távora on the Rei Grande was sent to Malindi in east-Africa to fetch for more supplies, while Albuquerque remained with his Cirne in the Gulf of Aden, contacting the Somalis of the Horn and raiding merchant ships.

In April, Francisco de Távora returned to Socotra in the company of Diogo de Melo and Martim Coelho and their respective vessels, whom he encountered in east Africa on their way to India. For the garrison of Socotra, they bore the first news of Portugal in two years.

In August, Albuquerque again set sail to Hormuz to scout its situation, and on the way sacked Qalhat, for having given spoilt foodstuffs the previous year. Upon seeing that Hormuz had been duly fortified, and that the Cirne was taking in a dangerous amount of water, he returned to India.

Albuquerque vowed not to cut his beard until he had conquered Hormuz.

== Takeover of Hormuz, 1515 ==
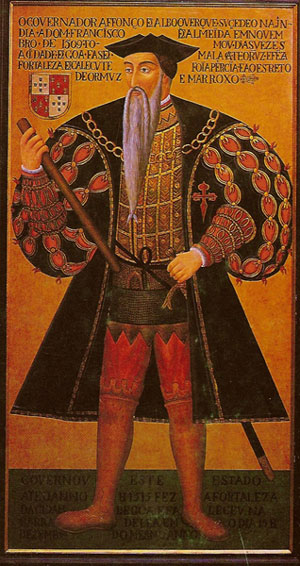
Afonso de Albuquerque

On 4 November 1509, Albuquerque succeeded Francisco de Almeida as governor of Portuguese India.

Before returning to Hormuz, he conquered Goa in 1510, Malacca in 1511, and undertook an incursion to the Red Sea in 1513. Albuquerque never stopped gathering information on Hormuz nor even exchanging ambassadors or corresponding with its viziers during this time. Important changes had taken place in Hormuz between 1507 and 1515 that motivated Albuquerque to make a move as soon as possible.

Coge Atar had been murdered and the new vizier, his right-hand man Rais Nureddin Fali, had King Seyf Ad-Din poisoned and replaced on the throne with his eighteen-year-old brother, Turan Shah. Rais Nureddin was driven from power by his nephew Rais Ahmed through a coup and maintained power through brute force and repression, with the support of an opposing faction in court, greatly frightening young Turan Shah with the spectre of assassination or blindness.

Albuquerque assembled at Goa a fleet of 27 vessels, 1,500 Portuguese men, and 700 Malabarese. In March 1515, the Portuguese once more anchored before Hormuz, at the sound of trumpets and a powerful artillery salvo. "The ships appeared on fire", as the eyewitness Gaspar Correia would later recount.

Hormuz was found fortified and prepared for a drawn-out struggle, with the roads barricaded and defended with artillery. Turan Shah and Rais Nureddin did not oppose Albuquerque, hoping that he might be an ally against the usurper Rais Ahmed, labelled by the Portuguese a "tyrant", as the Portuguese had proven to be only interested in trade and tribute and not in effective control of the kingdom. Thus, on 1 April, Turan Shah authorized Albuquerque to land his forces and formally re-take possession of Hormuz without bloodshed, and so, the flag of Portugal was hoisted over the island.

== Aftermath ==
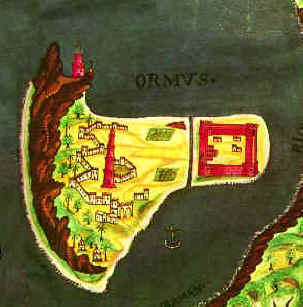
A Portuguese map of Hormuz, 17th century

Before proceeding with the affairs of Hormuz, Albuquerque offered a grand public audience to an ambassador that Shah Ismail sent to Hormuz seeking to open diplomatic talks with Portugal. Ismail had been defeated at the Battle of Chaldiran the year before but both Albuquerque and the Shah sought to cooperate against the Ottoman Empire.

For the great Lord who commands, stay of the governors and great ones of the religion of Messiah. Mighty warrior, strong and great-hearted Lion of the Sea, Sir Captain General most pleasing to my eyes and heart, you stand high in my esteem, and this is certain as the light of dawn, and unmistakable as the scent of musk! I desire you may be always great and prosperous and that your path may be illuminated as your heart may desire. I would have you know how Coge Alijan came and told me of your love and your goodwill. Some words exchanged between you, he repeated very well, and they increased our mutual friendship. Therefore I send Coge Alijan that he may tell you some things I said to him and make them known to you. I beg you to dispatch him soon and send him back to me. Send me also some master gunners and I shall satisfy them as they wish. I ask this of you for our friendship's sake. All my hope rests with you, and let our messengers ever come and go. Anything you desire of me, ask it of him and have great confidence in my friendship!

— Shah Ismail to Afonso de Albuquerque.

Several weeks after, Albuquerque was informed by Turan Shah that Reis Ahmed plotted both their assassinations. Albuquerque requested a meeting with the king and his ministers at a palace heavily guarded by Portuguese soldiers. There, he had his captains murder Reis Ahmed in the presence of the king, thus freeing Turan Shah from the yoke of the usurper. In reassuring Turan Shah of his safety as a vassal of Portugal, Albuquerque knighted the king and addressed him not as a conqueror but as a servant,

Lord Turuxá, king of Hormuz, you are now a knight, and by these arms that I give to thee and by the friendship of the king of Portugal, I in his name, as well as all these knights and fidalgos, shall serve you to our deaths; and so, order the heads of any whom you deem deserving cut off, and fear no one as long as you are a friend of milord the king.

Senhor Turuxá, rey d'Ormuz, agora sois feito cavalleiro, e com estas armas que vos dou e com a boa amizade do rey de Portugal, eu em seu nome, com estes seus cavalleiros, e fidalgos, todos vos serviremos até morrer; e portanto mandai cortar as cabeças a quantos volos merecerem, e não ajais medo de ninguém em quanto fordes amigo com ElRey meu senhor.

Meanwhile, a mutinous crowd had formed around the palace, fearing the king had been assassinated. Turan Shah was then led to the palace rooftop, where he triumphantly addressed the city, that now cheered for the death of Reis Ahmed.

=== The Portuguese fortress ===
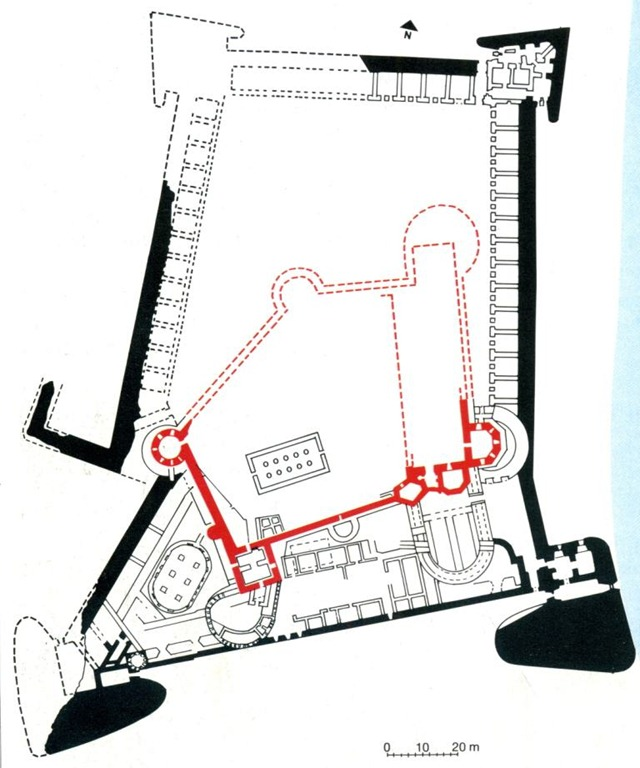
A plan of the Portuguese fortress of Hormuz. The early fort laid down by Albuquerque is marked in red.

With Hormuz secured, Albuquerque resumed building the fortress, employing his men and hired local labour, a work in which he participated personally. The site at the northern tip of the tear-drop shaped island of Hormuz, strategically overlooking the city and both harbours on either side, was selected for its construction. Its layout resembled an irregular pentagon with seven towers and was christened in honor of Our Lady of Conception, Fortaleza da Nossa Senhora da Conceição de Hormuz, in Portuguese. It had a garrison of 400 Portuguese soldiers. During construction, the captains suggested that the walls were not thick enough but Albuquerque replied that,

So long as they are upheld by justice and without oppression, they are more than sufficient. But if good faith and humanity cease to be observed in these lands, then pride will overthrow the strongest walls we have.

— Afonso de Albuquerque

A large courtyard was opened between the fortress and the city. A large pillory was also erected in the marketplace.

In 1550, the old fortress was renovated and expanded under the guise of architect Inofre de Carvalho, who designed a larger fortress better adapted to the precepts of modern gunpowder warfare.

=== Portuguese administration ===
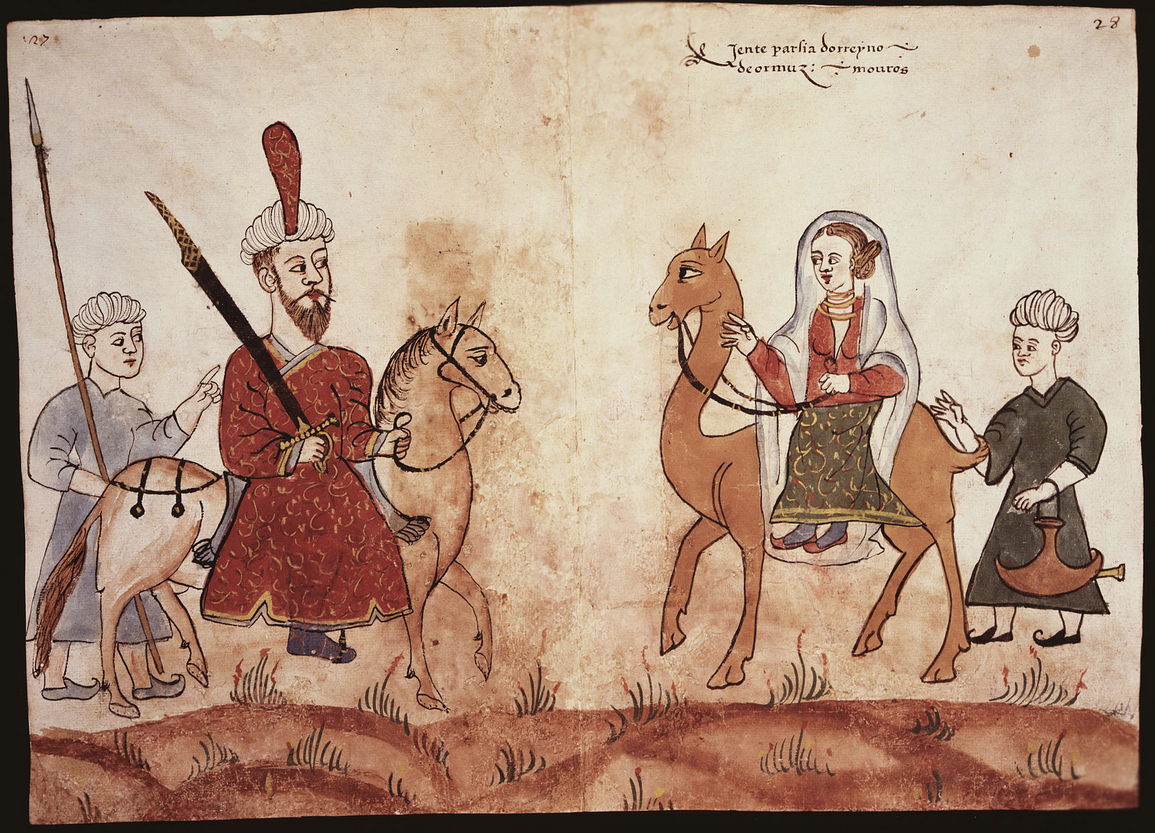
Persians of Hormuz as depicted by the Portuguese in the Códice Casanatense

At Hormuz, Albuquerque adopted the principle of indirect rule: the king was allowed to rule his kingdom as a vassal of the Portuguese Crown, but it was disarmed and the Portuguese took control of defence, leaving only a royal guard, effectively turning it into a protectorate. The yearly tribute of 15,000 ashrafi was enforced, and Albuquerque collected the tribute in arrears: 120,000 ashrafi. Throughout the 16th century, this sum would progressively be raised. Yet Albuquerque did not interfere in local politics.

The old state of violent intrigue between the various court factions at Hormuz and the brutal repression by Rais Ahmed had dissuaded many merchants from seeking the city in recent years, causing trade to decline; such a tendency was only reversed by the Portuguese takeover. At the same time, the presence of Portuguese forces at Hormuz also made navigation much safer in the Gulf. The rulers of Basra, Bahrein, Lar, and neighboring Persian governors dispatched embassies to Albuquerque, seeking friendly relations. Some from the interior of the Arabian peninsula, the Persian mainland as far as Tartary dispatched envoys as well. Great crowds would form whenever Albuquerque rode through the streets, and painters were sent to Hormuz to take his portrait.

As all seagoing trade between India and the Middle-East passed through Hormuz, the total yearly revenue of Hormuz was estimated by certain Portuguese authors such as Gaspar Correia at about 140,000 cruzados, 100,000 of those from the customs alone; the Portuguese historian João de Barros reported that in 1524, the customs had yielded 200,000 cruzados. With Hormuz secured, Albuquerque captured the strategic war-horses trade, from Arabia and Persia to India via Hormuz, which he directed to Goa. Of all the Portuguese possessions in the Orient, Hormuz came to be a vital source of income for the Portuguese State of India.

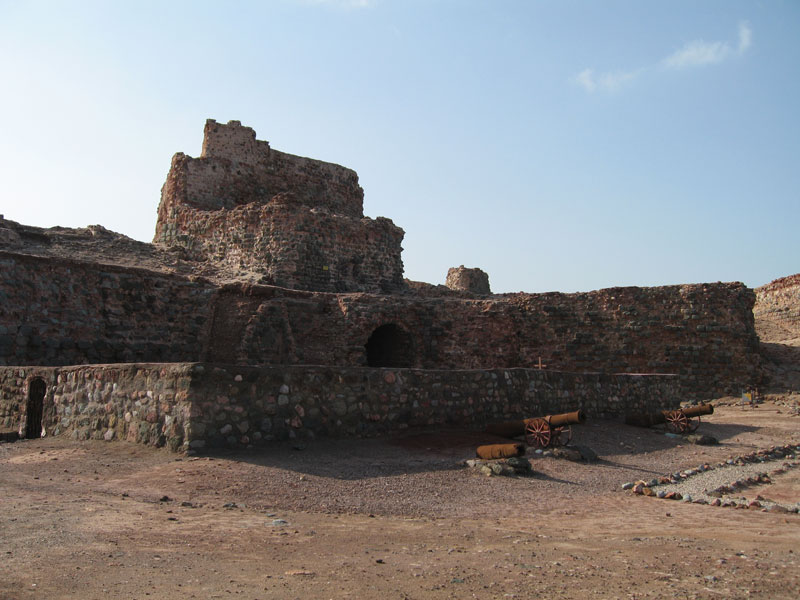
The Fort Nossa Senhora da Conceição, Hormuz Island

In 1521, the king of Bahrain, a vassal of Hormuz rebelled against Hormuzi suzerainty, refusing to pay the due tribute. Bahrain was then conquered by António Correia with 400 Portuguese soldiers supported by 3,000 Hormuzi and Arab troops, and annexed to the Kingdom of Hormuz. Henceforth it was administered by an Hormuzi governor. Later that year, the city of Hormuz itself rose in revolt against the Portuguese, but it was suppressed. In 1523, Sohar in Oman likewise rebelled, but it was pacified by Dom Luís de Menezes, while Muscat and Qalhat rebelled in 1526 but were likewise pacified.

In 1552, Ottoman vessels under the command of Piri Reis attacked the city, but he failed to capture it. Hormuz, and the Persian Gulf as a whole, would see intense competition between the Ottomans and Portuguese during the 1550s as part of the Ottoman–Portuguese conflicts. Portuguese and Turkish fleets would clash before Hormuz in 1553 at the Battle of the Strait of Hormuz and in 1554 at the Battle of the Gulf of Oman, the Turkish force being destroyed outright in the latter. In 1559, the Ottomans made a Siege of Bahrain their final attempt to capture the port but failed.

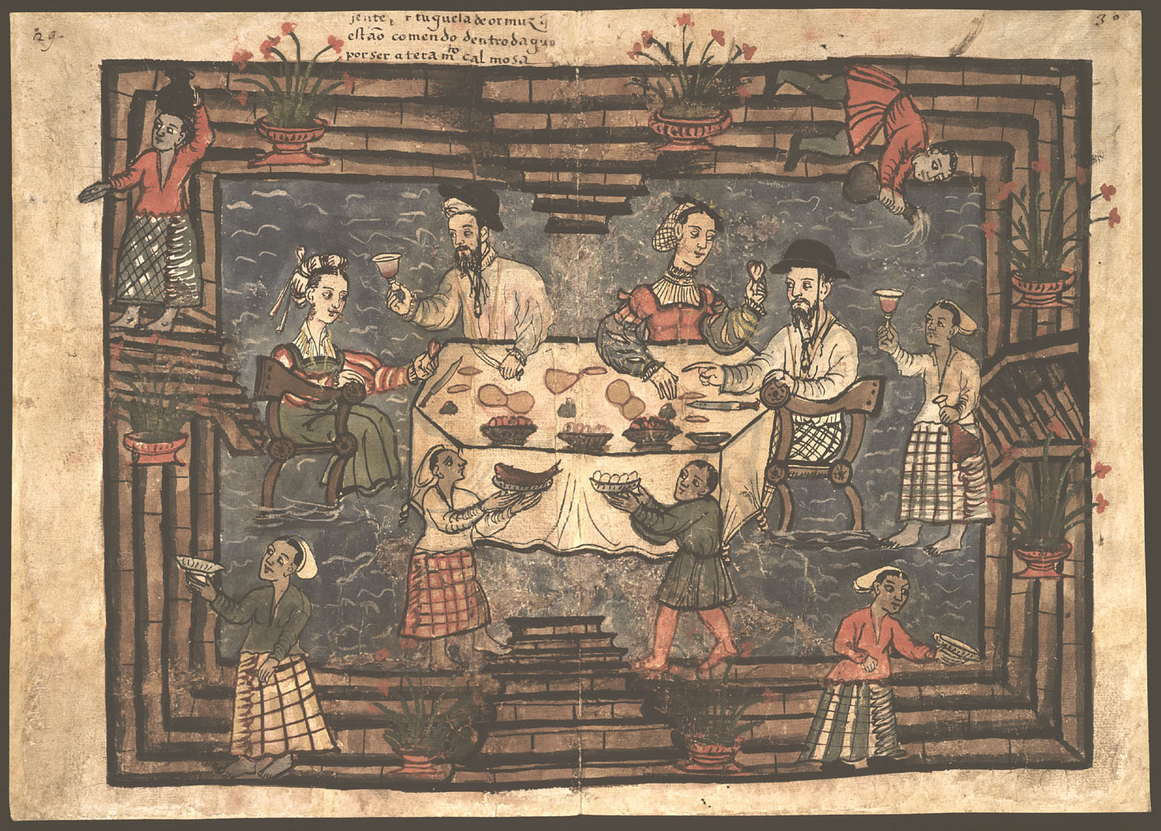
Dinner in a Portuguese household at Hormuz

An account of the history of Hormuz was first published in Europe in 1569−1570, when the Portuguese friar Gaspar da Cruz published the "Chronicle of the Kingdom of Hormuz", translated from original documents during his stay in the city; he included it in his Tratado das Cousas da China, the first European book with an exclusive focus on China. It was first translated into English in the early 17th century by Samuel Purchas.

Hormuz would remain a Portuguese client-state until the fall of Hormuz to a combined English-Persian force in 1622.

== See also ==
- Kingdom of Hormuz
- Portuguese Empire
- Afonso de Albuquerque
  - Portuguese conquest of Goa
  - Portuguese conquest of Malacca
  - Siege of Aden (1513)
- Anglo-Persian capture of Hormuz
- British occupation of Bushehr
- Portuguese Socotra
- Portuguese Oman
- Afonso de Albuquerque Square
- Ottoman–Portuguese conflicts (1538–1560)
  - Siege of Qatif (1551)
  - Ottoman campaign against Hormuz
  - Battle of the Strait of Hormuz (1553)
  - Battle of the Gulf of Oman
  - Siege of Bahrain
- Portuguese–Safavid wars
