= Rasini =

- Town
- Country: Somalia
- Gobol: Lower Juba
- Time zone: UTC+3 (EAT)

Rasini, also known as Kikoni, is a small town in the southern Lower Juba province of Somalia.

== Overview ==
Rasini is situated in the southernmost part of the country, opposite Chula on the Bajuni Islands. It is positioned on top of a low coral cliff on the littoral.

The area is one of the more prominent archaeological sites in southern Somalia. In earlier charts and maps, it is alternately identified as "Castellated Ruin" or "Portuguese Castle".

Rasini contains a number of monuments. Among these structures is a small mosque, whose mihrab Grottanelli suggests is among the best examples of Islamic art in the wider region. The wall niche has a short arch and a very high capital. A tomb lies above the mihrab, which is adorned with a clover leaf design that also appears on another tomb in Koyama and again at Barawa. According to Elliot, who visited Rasini, the masjid was built by Sherif Ismail bin Omar, the son of Chula's tenth recorded headman Sherif Omari. Based on this, the mosque is estimated to have been constructed as late as the 18th century, between 1725 and 1765.

Additionally, Rasini has a number of pillar tombs. These are located on a hill within a five-minute walking distance from the shore, along a "Galla travelling path" to the west of the mosque. Elliot observed three such monuments herein, one of which marked the grave of Sherif Omar Ismail. The second tomb belonged to Sheikh Ali. Its pillar was 5.64 meters in height, circular in shape, and featured six notches earmarked for ceramics, including a "Lamu China" vessel found in the highest depression. The third pillar tomb was that of Sherif Ismail bin Omar himself. Its construction was dated to the same period as the Rasini mosque. The tomb's 4.27m column was different in shape, being rectangular rather than circular. It reportedly once had bowls on display in its frontal notches, with only the highest vessel still extant. An urn also used to sit atop the pillar.

On a ridge in a hill range between the Rasini masjid and Anole Creek, Brenner also noted several "fortified buildings" and a dilapidated mosque. The structures were located around 60 minutes walk from the coast. On the horizon he reported seeing tombs with other monuments on the walls and step-ends at the corners, as well as pillar tombs. Two of the columns stood several meters from the ground. Brenner likewise observed some inscriptions, which were deemed unreadable.

== See also ==
- Somali architecture
