= Fort Nossa Senhora da Conceição =

Castle in Hormuz, Iranian national heritage site

Coordinates: 27.100675°N 56.452126°E

Fort of Our Lady of the Conception
- Hormuz Island in Iran
- The Portuguese Castle on Hormuz Island

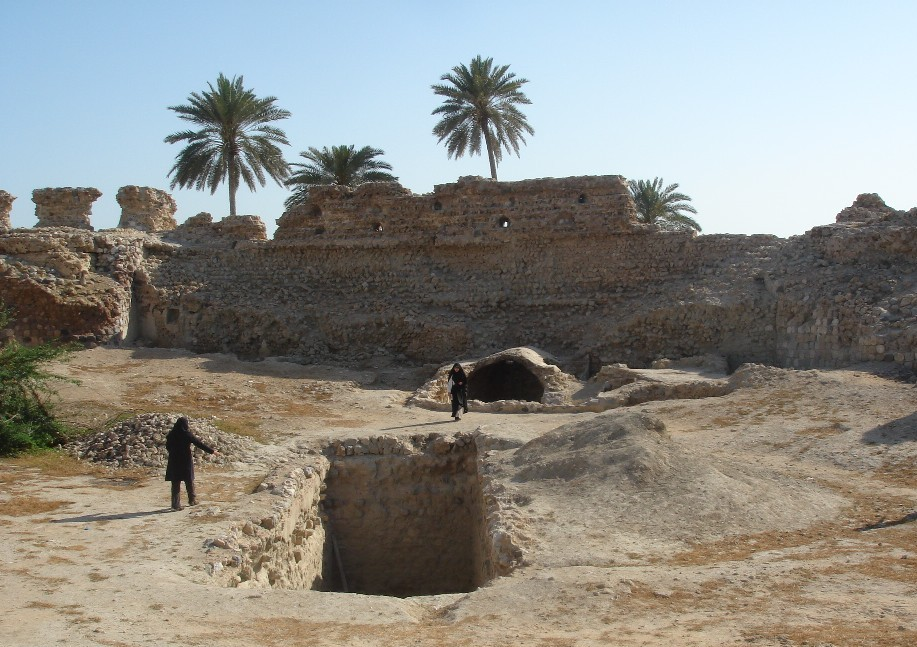
- The Portuguese Castle in Qeshm

Site information
- Type: Fort

Location
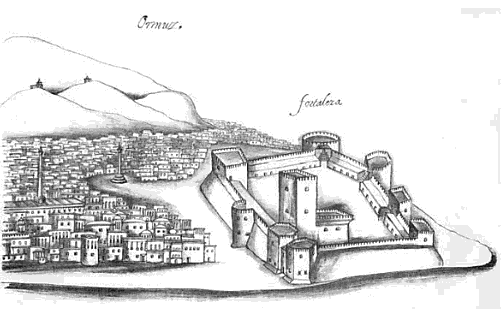
- The Portuguese Castle (Gaspar Correia-"Lendas da Índia", c. 1556)

Site history
- Built: 1515
- Materials: Stone

The Fort of Our Lady of the Conception, also known as the Portuguese Castle, is a red stone fortress on Hormuz Island, Iran. It is one of the last surviving monuments of Portuguese colonial rule in the Persian Gulf. Ormuz (or Hormuz) was an important maritime city and a small kingdom near the entrance to the Persian Gulf. The original site of the city was on the north shore of the Gulf, about 30 miles east of the current Bandar Abbas. Around 1300, apparently in response to attacks from the Tartars, it moved to the small island of Gerun, which can be identified as the Organa of Nearcho, about 12 miles west and 5 miles from the coast.

Constructed on reddish stone on a rocky promontory at the far north of the island, the castle was originally cut off from the rest of the island by a moat, traces of which still remain. Although most of the roof caved in long ago, much of the lower part of the very substantial outer walls is intact, with the remains lying on different levels of the site.

== History ==
The building of the castle was ordered by Portuguese commander Afonso de Albuquerque in 1507, when his forces seized the island for a short time, being then named "Fort of Our Lady of Victory" (Forte de Nossa Senhora da Vitória). Engaging his men of all ranks in the building works, Albuquerque faced a revolt and had to retreat. He came back and reconquered the island in 1515, when he completed and renamed the fort. The Safavid Shah, Abbas the Great (1587–1629), wanted to end Portuguese rule in the south and eventually managed to convince the British East India Company to allow its ships to cooperate with his land forces to seize the island from the Portuguese in 1622.

=== Captains ===
List of captains of Hormuz fortress:

- Pero de Albuquerque (1515-1518)
- D. Garcia Coutinho (1518-1522)
- João Rodriguez de Noronha (1522-1524)
- Diogo de Melo (1524-1528)
- Cristóvão de Mendonça (1528-1530)
- Belchior de Sousa (1530-1532)
- António da Silveira (1532-1535)
- Martim Afonso de Mello Jusarte (1535-1537)
- D. Pedro de Castelo Branco (1537-1538)
- Doutor Pero Fernandes (1538)
- D. Fernando de Lima (1538 [May])
- Fernão de Ávares Cernache (1538)
- Martim Afonso de Melo Jusarte (1538-1545)
- Luís Falcão (1545-1547)
- D. Manuel de Lima (1547-1548)
- Bernalldim de Sousa (1548-1550)
- D. Alvaro de Noronha (1550-1555)
- Antão de Noronha (1555-1561)
- D. Pedro de Sousa (1562-1565)
- D. Gonçalo de Meneses (1581-1583)
- Matias da Albuquerque (1583-1587)
- Ruy Gonçalves da Camara (1587-1589)
- Pedro Coutinho (1602-1604)
- Diego Moniz Barreto (1604-1608)
- Garcia de Melo (1608-1612)
- Luís da Gama (1613-1619)
- D. Luís de Sousa (1619-1620)
- D. Francisco de Sousa (1620-1621)
- Simão de Mello (1621-1622)

== Other Portuguese castles ==
A number of other Portuguese castles are found in the Persian Gulf islands, including the castle in Qeshm.

During the Habsburg dynasty (1581–1640), the Portuguese built a fortress in Dibba Al-Hisn and a wall around the city. In August 1648, the Arabs besieged Muscat, Oman, and on 31 October 1648 a treaty was signed between the two opponents. The terms were as follows: the Portuguese should build the fortress of Kuriyat, Dibba Al-Hisn, and Matrah (Oman).

== See also ==
- List of Iranian castles
- Iranian architecture
