= Army of the Mughal Empire =

Armed forces of the Mughal Empire

Mughal Army
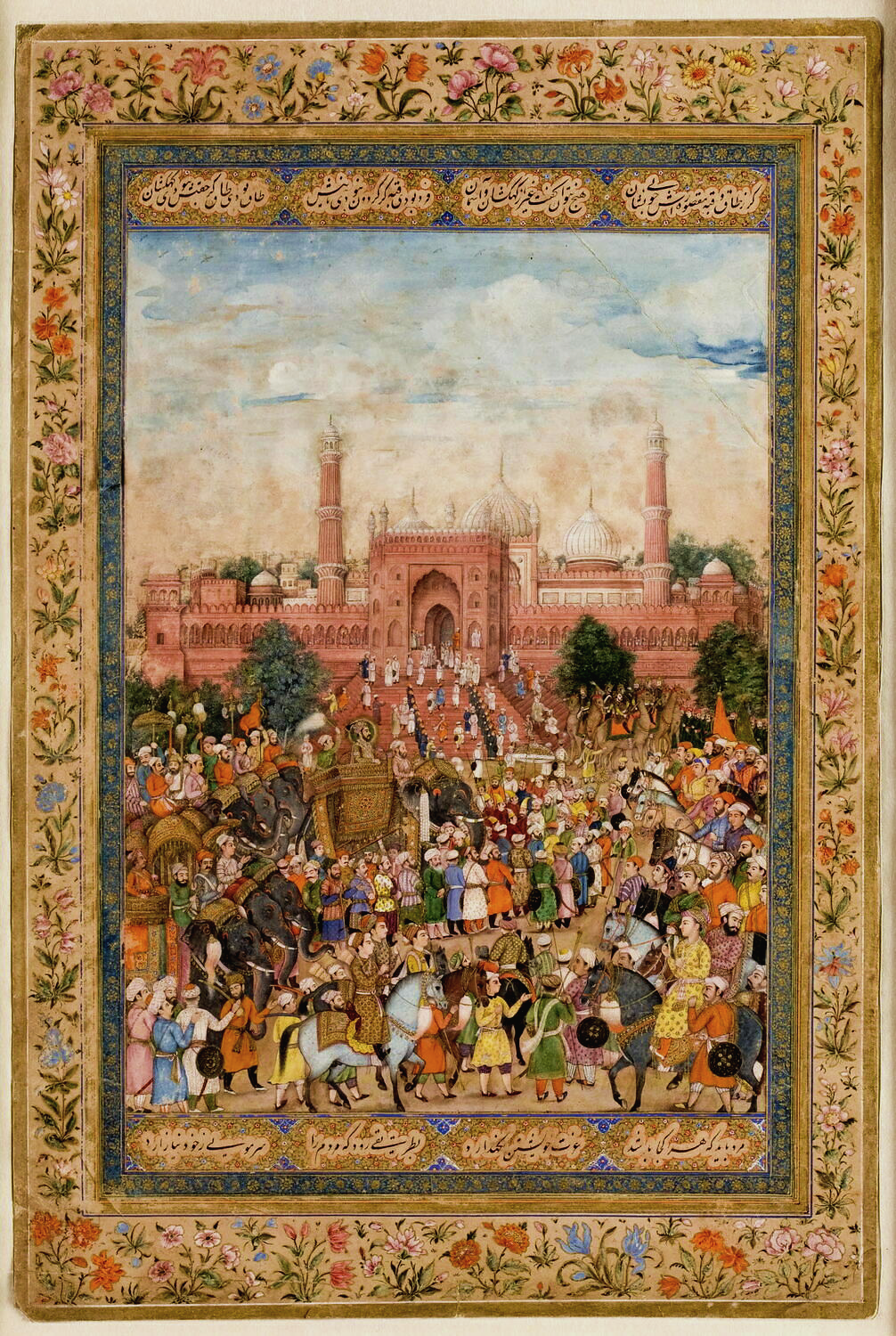
- Arrival of an imperial procession of the emperor Farrukh Siyar at Delhi's "world-revealing" mosque on a Friday, to hear the sermon (khutba) recited in his name
- Founded: c. 1556
- Disbanded: c. 1806
- Headquarters: Exalted camp / Victorious camp

Leadership
- Former Military: Timurid Army
- Padishah: Mughal Emperor
- Grand-Vizier: Mughal Vazere'azam

Personnel
- Military age: 15-25
- Active personnel: Regular army: 911,400–4,039,097 infantry; 342,696 cavalry; Total: 4,400,000 - 26,000,000 personnel

Expenditure
- Budget: 12,071,876,840 dams

The army of the Mughal Empire was the military force by which the Mughal emperors established and expanded their empire. Although its origins, like the Mughals themselves, were in the cavalry-based armies of central Asia, its essential form and structure was established by the third emperor, Akbar. The regular forces were mainly recruited and fielded by Mansabdar officers.

During the 17th century, the army became the earth's largest, numbering 911,400–4,049,097 infantry (zats) and 342,696–15,000,000 cavalry (Swari). Alternatively, according to the Abul Fazl's census, the size of the army was roughly about 4.4 million, with less than half a million trained as cavalry; while modern Indian historians estimate 26 million.

The Mughal dominated India, employing superior engineering and logistic mastery. Historians compared the Mughal army with that of the Roman Empire or the United States Armed Forces in terms of force projection. In logistical superiority, the Mughals were comparable with the British Army during the Victorian Era. Historian Stephen Morillo claimed that Western scholarship generally overlooked the destructive scale of Asian empires such as the Mughal, not unlike the Roman Empire.

British historian Jeremy Black claimed that the Mughal army's struggles until their decline in the wake of Nader Shah's invasion of India reflected Asiatic military development in the 17th century. Black's evaluation contrasted with other historians who claimed that Asian empire militaries during the 17th century were influenced by the Military Revolution in Europe. This period coincided with the costly Deccan wars, which substantially damaged the Mughal army.

Historians such as Irfan Habib and Farhat Hasan claimed that Mughal cavalry was unmatched in South Asian conflicts. Its superiority in discipline and shock charge were a staple of its success. By the 16th-17th century, Mughal horses were imported, mostly from Arabia, Iran, Turkey, and Central Asia.

Due to their adoption of gunpowder warfare, historians Marshall Hodgson and colleague William H. McNeill termed the Mughals a gunpowder empire. The Mughal army employed heavy cannons, light artillery, grenades, rockets, and heavy mortar among other weapons. Heavy cannons were expensive and difficult to transport, and had to be dragged by elephants and oxen.

The Mughal naval forces were named the Amla-e-Nawara. In Dhaka, the Mughal naval fleet contained 768 ships with 933 foreigner crews of Portuguese origin and 8,112 artillery personnel. They maintained fleets of warships and transport ships.

== History ==
Battles raged throughout the period of the Mughal Empire. Like many Central Asian armies, the Mughal army of Babur was horse-oriented. The ranks and pay of the officers were based on the horses they retained. Babur's army was small and inherited the Timurid military traditions of Central Asia. Babur did not introduce a gunpowder warfare system, instead relying on mounted archery. Babur's empire did not last long and the Mughal Empire collapsed with the expulsion of Humayun. The Mughal Empire founded by Akbar in 1556 proved more stable and enduring. Although the Mughals originated as a nomadic civilization, they grew more sedentary.

The armies of the Mughals were known for their high level of discipline and diverse personnel. They had absorbed almost all of Northern and Central South Asia. During the height of their military domination, their adversaries rarely fought frontal battles; the Maratha confederation, Ahmadnagar Sultanates, or the Rajput kingdoms were generally powerless against the Mughals ' cities and camps. They usually resorted to guerilla warfare or the Fabian strategy. By the time of Aurangzeb's reign the army still remained heavily diverse composed of Turanis (Central Asians), Persians, Afghans, and native Indians.

== Organization ==
The emperor's personal army numbered around 24,000 soldiers. Directly under royal command, these warriors were called Ahadis, a body of cavalry troopers.

Another term for the Mughal emperor's personal bodyguards which was associated with the Ahadis was the Walashahis (belonging to the king), or imperial bodyguards. Regarded as the most trusted and faithful troops, they were directly in the pay of the Emperor. They served as cavalrymen, similar to Ahadis. Walashahis were chiefly, if not entirely, men who had been attached to the Emperor since their youth and had served him while he was only a prince, and were thus marked as his personal attendants and household troops.

The Mughal army was generally divided into four branches: the cavalry (Aswaran), the infantry (Perigean), the artillery (Topkhana) and the navy. These were branches or classes that were distributed amongst the Mansabdars , each of whom commanded some of each of these forces. The exception to this rule was the artillery, which had its own designated commander, and was not part of the mansabdari troops. The Mughals followed the tradition of harsh execution of mutineers by strapping them into the mouth of cannon and blowing them apart. This tradition was copied by the British empire's military to punish their own mutineers.

=== Mansabdars ===
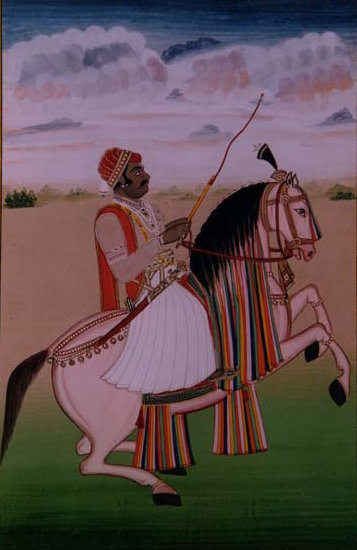
Man Singh I, mansabdar

Officers called mansabdars led the bulk of the Mughal armed forces. Under Akbar, as many as 1,600 mansabdars served. Shah Jahan had many as 8,000 mansabdars. Mansabdar officers worked for the government and were responsible for recruiting and maintaining their quota of horsemen. A Mansabdar's rank was based on the horsemen he provided, which ranged from 10 (the lowest), up to 5000. A prince had 25000. Their salaries were based on their ranks.

Historian Richard M. Eaton noted Aurangzeb's strengthening of the mansabdari system and rotation of jagirs, which ensured noble loyalty and political stability, deterring usurpation attempts during his early reign.

Each Mansabdar was responsible to the Mir Bakshi, or the head of Mughal empire's office of military and intelligence administrations. Aside from reporting to the Mir Bakshi, Mansabdars were often appointed as Subahdars, or heads of provincial administration where they were assisted by provincial officers such as Diwan, Bakhshi, Faujdar, Kotwal, Qazi, Sadr, Waqa-i-Navis, Qanungo and Patwari officers. Faujdaris aided their subahdar in maintaining law and order and enforcing imperial regulations, while also commanding thanas or military outposts, which were usually garrisoned with a fixed number of sowar (cavalry). According to Jos Gommans, the assessment and appointment of mansabdar officers was done personally by the emperor. Mughal administrative policies were directed at the heterogenous population of India which consisted of myriad backgrounds, social strata, ethnicities, and religious groups. While rare, foreigners from Europe such as the Englishman William Hawkins were sometimes appointed as Mansabdar. Hawkins provided records about the administrations of mansabdar, recording during his life the names of about 41 mansabdar officers who commanded about 3,000-5,000 Zat or horsemen.

=== Bakhshi officer ===
Bakhshi officers were charged with the management and payment of a province's military. The provincial bakhshi often simultaneously served as the province's waqia-navis (news writer), and reported on all provincial mansabdar's, including senior officials (such as the subahdar or diwan).The role of provincial bakhshi could face tension from the subahdar or diwan, since the bakhshi's activities kept these officials accountable to the imperial centre.

The Mir Bakhshi was the chief Bakhsh, and worked in the central administration. The position was also referred to as bakhshi-ul-mamalik or bakhshi-i-mamalik. Scholars translated the title as 'paymaster general' or 'army minister'. Unlike the Delhi Sultanate-era office, the Mughal version Mir Bakhshi's influence extended beyond the military, since every noble of the Mughal empire was a mansabdar.

=== Imperial camp and fortresses ===
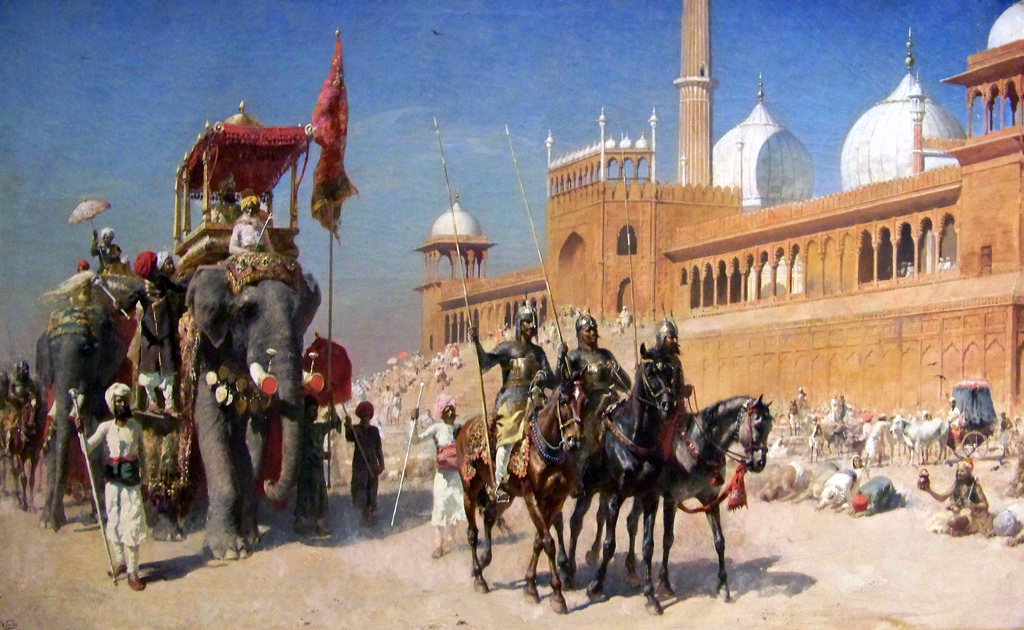
Great Mogul And His Court Returning From The Great Mosque At Delhi by Edwin Lord Weeks

The Mughal imperial camp, known as "The exalted camp" or "The victorious camp", was used for military expeditions and royal tours, also serving as a mobile, de facto administrative capital and imperial army headquarters. It was manned by hundreds of thousands of people and 50,000 horses and oxen required to transport tents, baggage and equipment as its challenge. Vincent Smith writes that the Mughal Camp was like a moving city from one place to other while Jean-Baptiste Tavernier, discussing about the mode of travelling, observed that the manner of travelling in those days was convenient like Italy or France.

This mobile military capital was constructed by more than 2,000 personnel and labourers sent ahead of the main force. From the time of Akbar, Mughal military camps were huge in scale, accompanied by members of the royal court, as well as soldiers and labourers. Administration and governance were carried out from within, with the Emperors spending a significant portion of their rule within these camps. Akbar's entourage included small camps for journeys or hunting and large camps for royal tours and military campaigns, which could altogether accommodate 300,000 people. The large camp travelled an estimated 6-16 km per day, preceded by agents, scouts and workers who handled logistics, preparing roads and bridges, campsites, purchasing food and fuel and assuring the cooperation of local rulers.

As mansabdars, royal household, domestic servants and others presented a picture of a well-planned city, moving from place to place, traveller Niccolao Manucci who witnessed it wrote that the grandeur of the entourage was far greater than any European ruler. Abul Fazl wrote that it was difficult to describe a large encampment, stating, "Each encampment required for its carriage 100 elephants, 500 camels, 400 carts and 100 bearers. It is escorted by 500 troopers, mansabdars, Ahadis besides, there are employed a thousand Farrashes, native of Iran, Turan and Hindustan, 500 pioneers, 100 water-carriers, 50 carpenters, tent makers and torch bearers, 50 workers in leather and 150 sweepers.". Antoni de Montserrat, who accompanied Akbar on a Kabul expedition, gave a detailed account of the magnitude of the Imperial Camp. The marches came in intervals, as the imperial army adopted the Persian traditions of gardens and large and extravagant tents. Persian texts such as the Epic of Gilgamesh, the Enuma Elish, the Code of Hammurabi, Zoroastrian texts such Vendidad and Yasna, and the Book of Genesis was implied in the pavilion structure of those gardens. The pavilion-like structures in different Persian type and names used in this mobile encampment, such as emarat, khaneh, qasr, moshkuy, sarai, shabistan tagh, iwan, and kakh, while on the other side, it contained some permanent structures, and also tents with different sizes and complexities such as khaimeh, khargah, and sardagh.

Akbar's massive mobile military encampment administration, followed by his successors, was accompanied by centralization policies practiced by the nomadic military style of his Central Asian predecessors, such as the Mongols of Genghis Khan, Timur empire, and Babur With steppe culture in mind, this model of military administration focused on the camps as a way to gain prestige and loyalty. Babur wrote frequently about pitching his camp throughout Hindustan as he advanced. Mobile technology that allowed Babur to evade his opponents was a military and political necessity because he was surrounded by raiding nomadic empires. Regardless of his defeats in battle, Babur maintained control by monopolizing control of his subjects' movements, deciding which paths they would take as they maneuvered around Hindustan in their struggle for power.

The Mughals also erected permanent military fortresses such as Lalbagh Fort, Allahabad Fort, Red Fort, Balapur Fort, and Purana Qila. They inherited chains of forts, or qilas that were scattered throughout the Deccan.

=== Manpower ===
Around the 17th century, the dynasty was ruling the world's wealthiest empire and controlling its largest military. The Mughals had an approximately 24 percent share of the world's economy and a military of millions of regular soldiers. Political scientist J. C. Sharman viewed the empire as one of Asia's great powers matching the Ming dynasty in terms of population, riches, and military power unmatched by their European contemporaries. Stephen Rosen calculated that even the highly conservative estimate for Indian peninsular military personnel per capita would at least rival contemporary Europe at the end of the Thirty Years' War, using his own estimate of 550,000 personnel for the Mughal military and a population of 105,000,000 for Europe west of the Ural Mountains.

The potential manpower of the Mughal empire in 1647, according to Kaushik Roy, reached 911,400 cavalry and infantry. He quoted the accumulation in imperial revenue of 12,071,876,840 dams, calculated by Streissand to support 342,696 cavalry and 4,039,097 infantry, while F. Valentijn estimated numbers higher than 4,000,000 in 1707. It further illustrated that during Shah Jahan's reign, in 1647, the Mughal army composed of about 911,400 infantry and cavalry, while from 1627 to 1658, it included 47,000 mounted musketeers, foot musketeers, gunners, and archers. Antoni de Montserrat recorded in Mongolicae Legationis Commentarius that in the Mughal–Afghan Wars alone, Akbar could muster 50,000 cavalry, 500 war elephants and camels, along with "countless number of infantry". De Montserrat claimed that the Mughal army under Akbar consisted of multiple ethnicities: Persians, Turkmen, Chagatais, Uzbeks, Pashtuns, Gujaratis, Pathans, Rajputs, and Balochis. Dirk H. A. Kolff claimed that this high estimate was essentially an "inventory of military labors" available for hiring in a single operation.

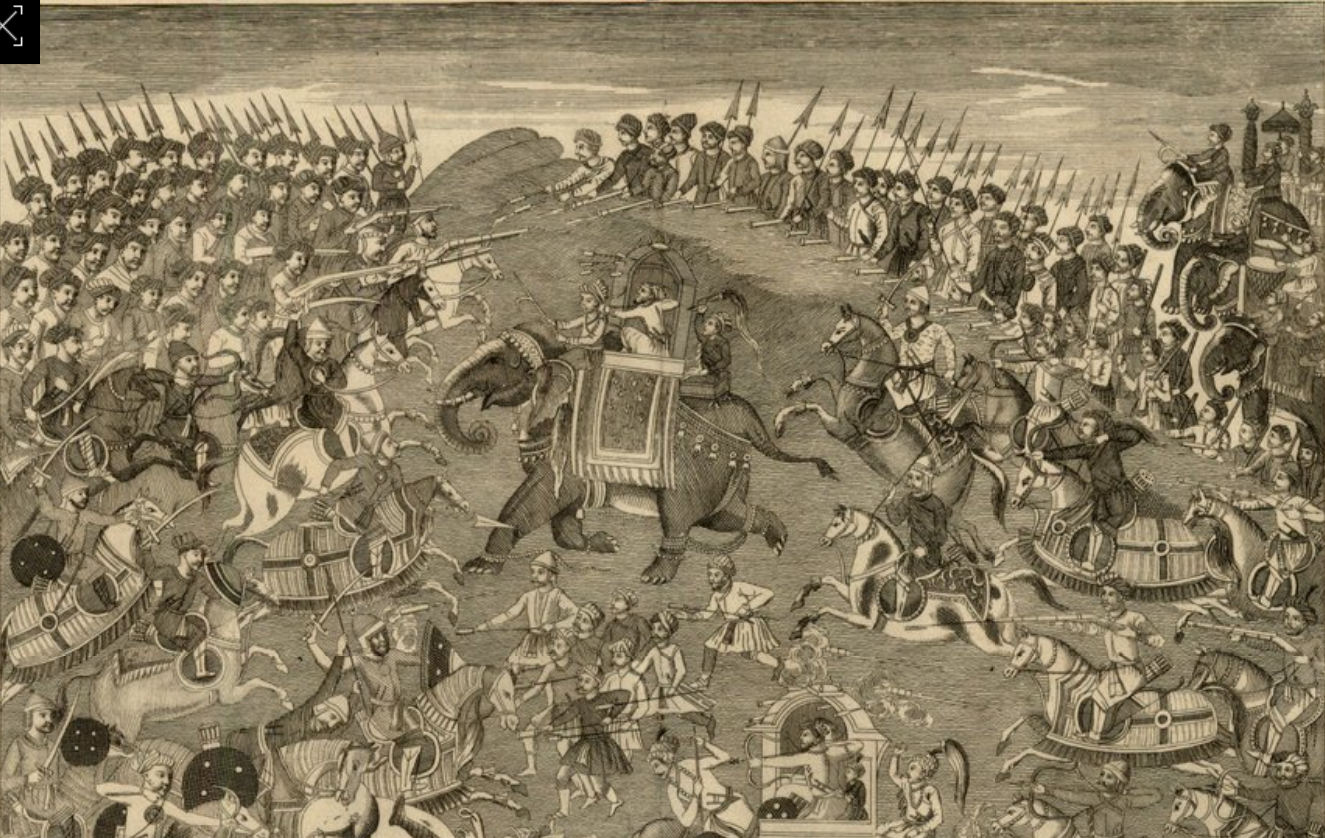
Battle between Mughal princes Chatelain

The Ain-i-Akbari chronicle recorded an estimate of 4 million soldiers including local auxiliaries, which consisted of infantries outside of Mughal controlled territories. According to Barua, this implied 3 percent of the Indian population in 1600. Barua asserted this number to exclude other political powers. Stephen Peter Rosen considered the 4,400,000 estimate of Mughal military population to be the most pragmatic, since he claimed that the Ain-i-Akbari census was too conservative, and did not cover the military population of southern India. Rosen inferred that Mughal military force numbered above 4.4 million. Far higher estimates came from Abraham Eraly, who quoted Tapan Raychaudhuri's work that the raw number of potential bodies of Mughal military personnel, including auxiliary forces, reached 26,000,000. Eraly added the reflection of massive numbers of this Mughal military expenses in the case of Aurangzeb, who brought about 170,000 cavalry troopers and similar numbers of infantry and non-combatants, for a campaign in Deccan alone. Eraly also mentioned Shah Jahan, who boasted about 900,000 troops.

Other estimates came from historian Abdul-Hamid Lahori recorded the Mughal military strength in 1647 as 200,000 paid cavalry, 185,000 other cavalry, and 40,000 garrisoned musketeers and gunners. Andrew de la Garza claimed that these troopers were not unorganized mobs, but rather units that had different roles, equipment and tasks, from heavy shock infantry that acted like Roman legionnaires or Swiss pikemen, to the Shamsherbaz units that served as halberdier, mace fighters, or sword gladiators.

Soldiers were given the option to be paid either in monthly/annual payments or jagir; many chose jagir. The emperor also allocated jagir to mansabdars for maintenance of the mansabs.

=== Logistics ===
The Mughal military developed an advanced logistics system, which according Rosen was comparable with the Romans or the US Army. Historian Jeremy Black compared Mughal logistics with the Victorian era British army.

Its massive war machine, complemented by large numbers of settler pioneers, animal trainers, security forces, spies, chefs, artisans, and others, allowed for armed forces that could operate effectively in any season or terrain.

To ensure supplies for their massive cavalry forces, the empire had to ensure the transportation of fodder. A key component was producing revenue to employ camp followers such as accountants, bankers, and merchants for months and years. Hundreds of Mughal nobles had to supply their needs. The followers handled the needs of large camps inhabitants. They established an credit institution or Hundi system to supply the camps from local markets. Gommans noted that due to the empire's wealth, it was not necessary to frequently move their encampment sites.

The logistics department proved pivotal in supporting naval fleets. The army logistical units cleared the jungles in coastal area and built roads and canals. This allowed naval units to advance, such as during operations in Assam by Mir Jumla and Chittagong by Shaishta Khan. Rivers and waterways peninsula proved crucial for the empire to transport their heavy artillery.

== Arms and weapons ==
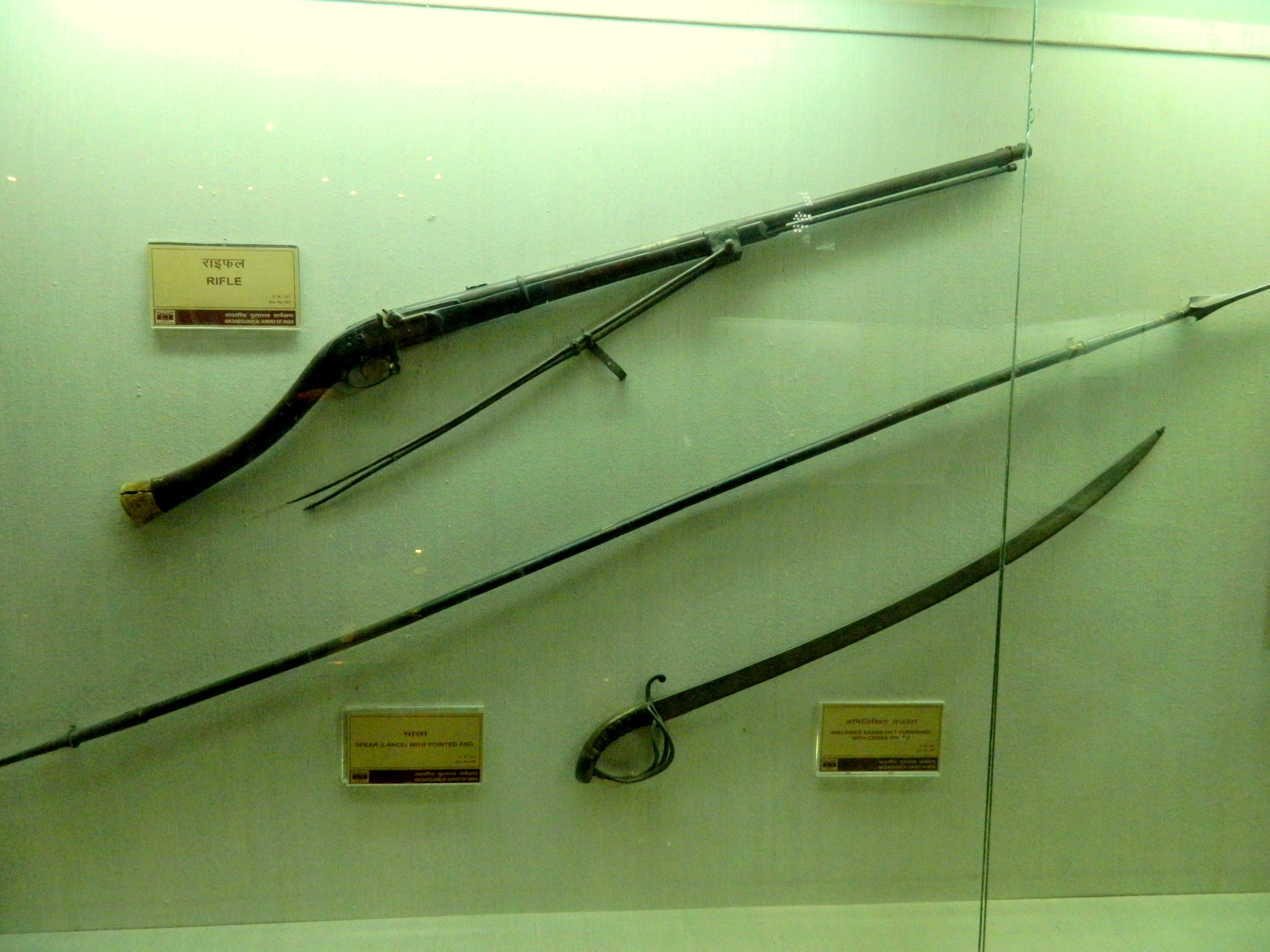
Weapons used by the Mughal Infantry

The Mughal's most important military equipment production centers were Delhi and Lahore. Karkhanas or workshops produced arms, ammunition, and imperial stable-harnesses for horses using iron, copper and other metals.

The main weapons were the sword, spear, and bow and arrow.

The Firangi (/fəˈrɪŋɡiː/) sword is a European style straight sword. Many classical image depictions of Mughal nobles holding firangis, or accompanied by retainers carrying their masters' firangis, suggest that this sword was a symbol of martial virtue and power. It was used until the Indian Mutiny in 1857-58. The Rajput Shamserbaz infantry carried a halberd and mace. Some were equipped with sword-and-buckler set and a two-handed sword similar to the Zweihänder, where they fought like central European Doppelsöldners on the offensive.

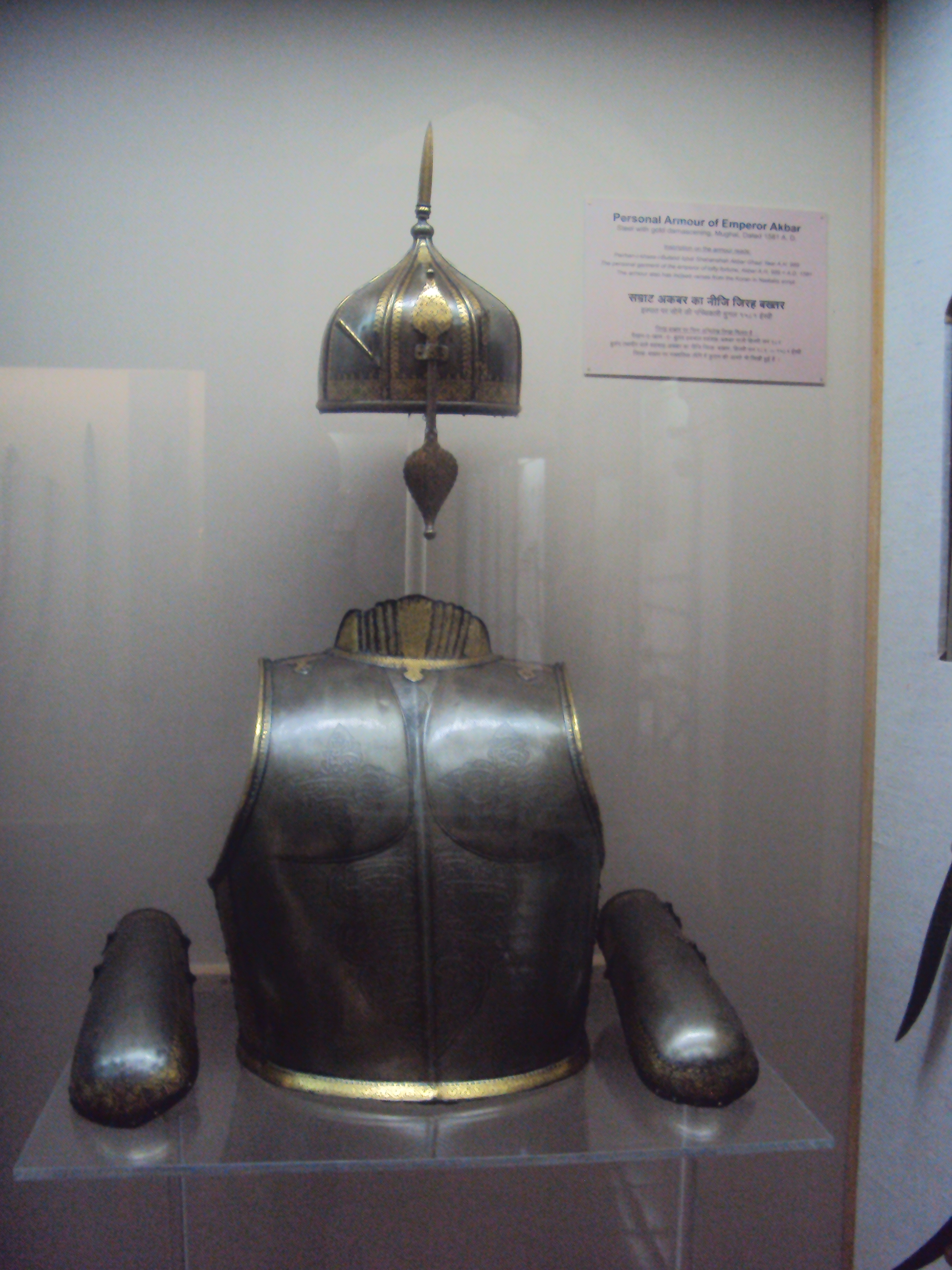
Personal body armour of emperor Akbar

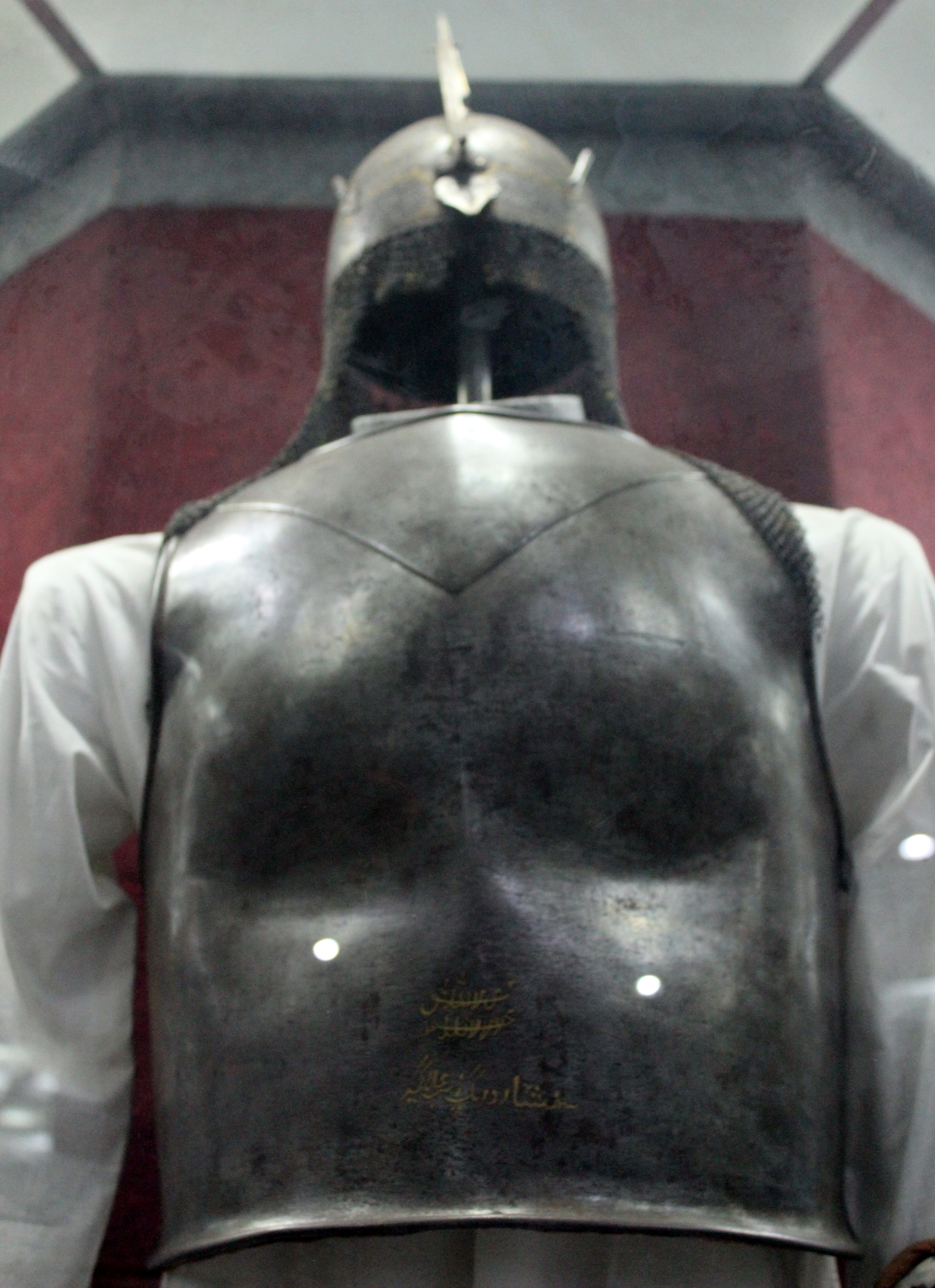
Personal body armour of emperor Aurangzeb

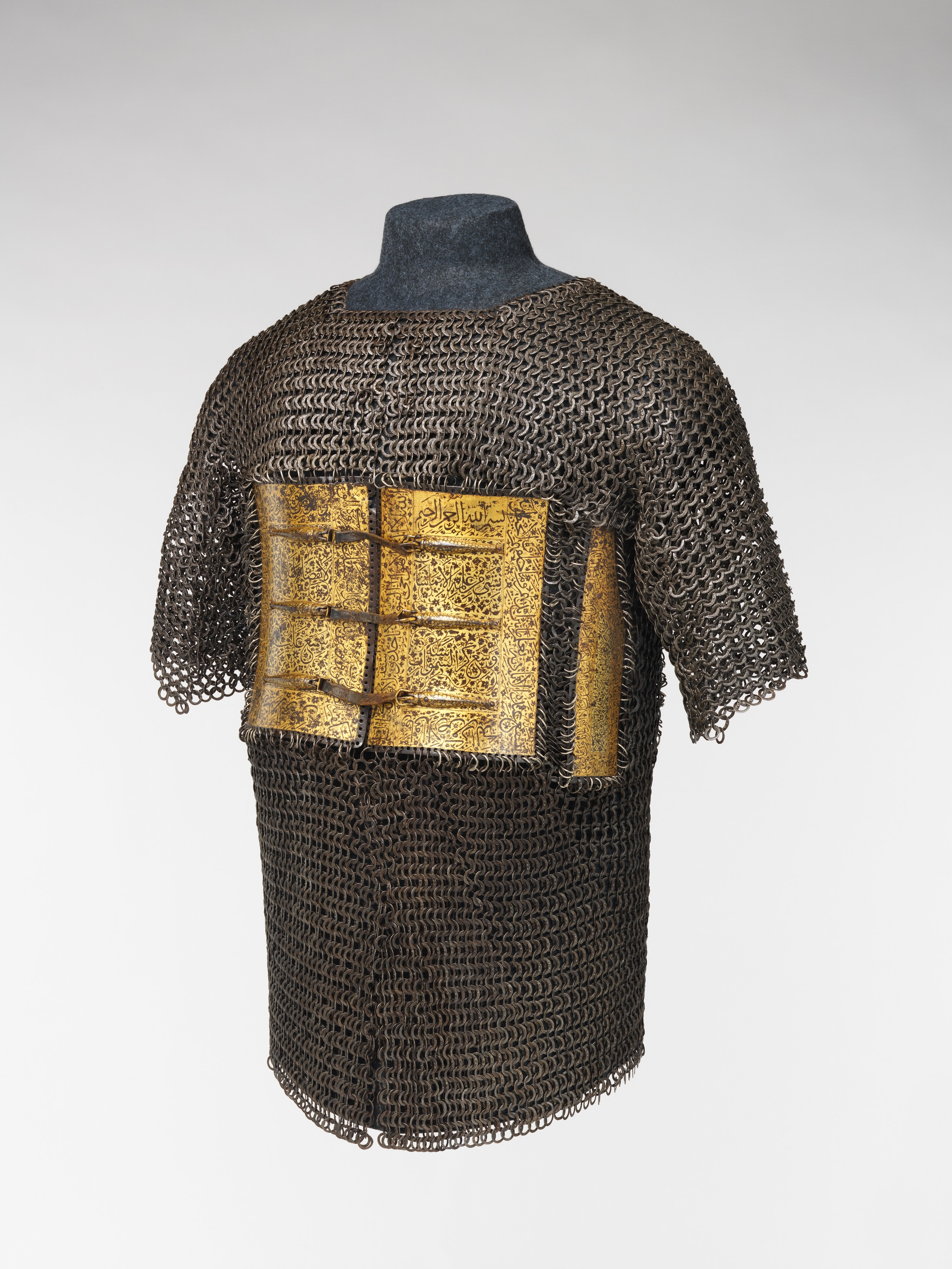
Personal body armour of emperor Shah Jahan

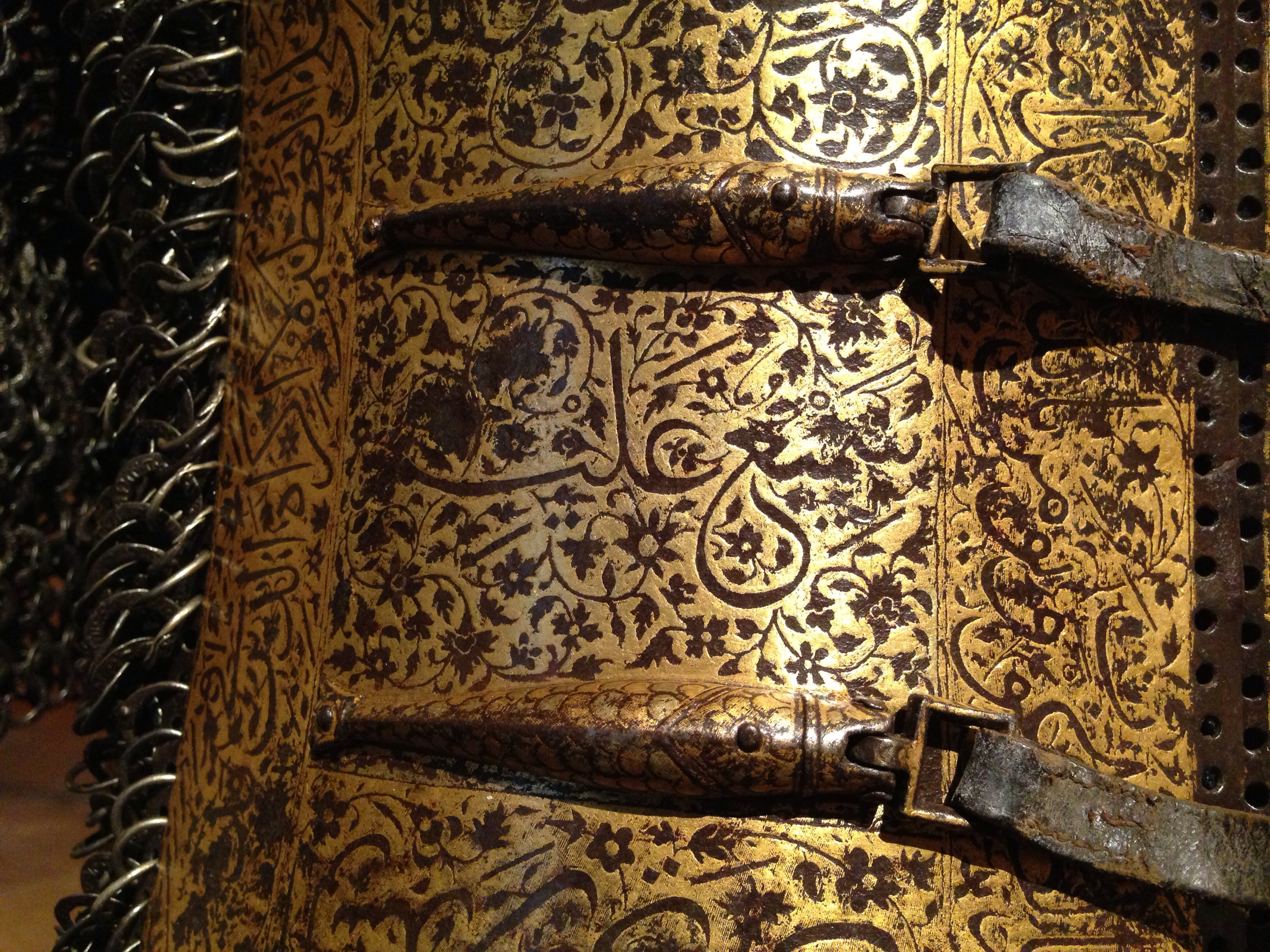
inscription detail of a Mughal armour

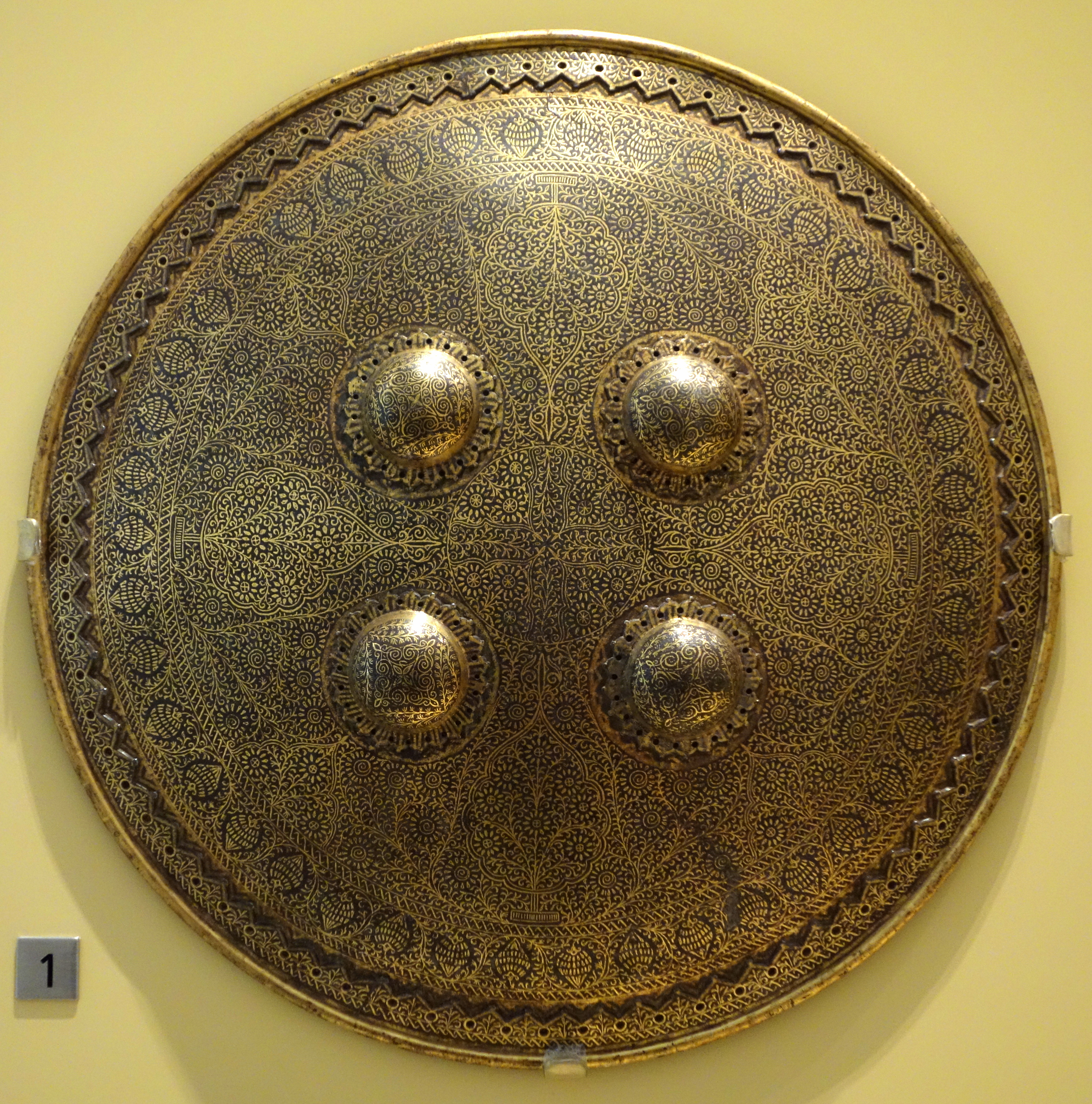
Dhal (shield) from the Northern India during the Mughal era

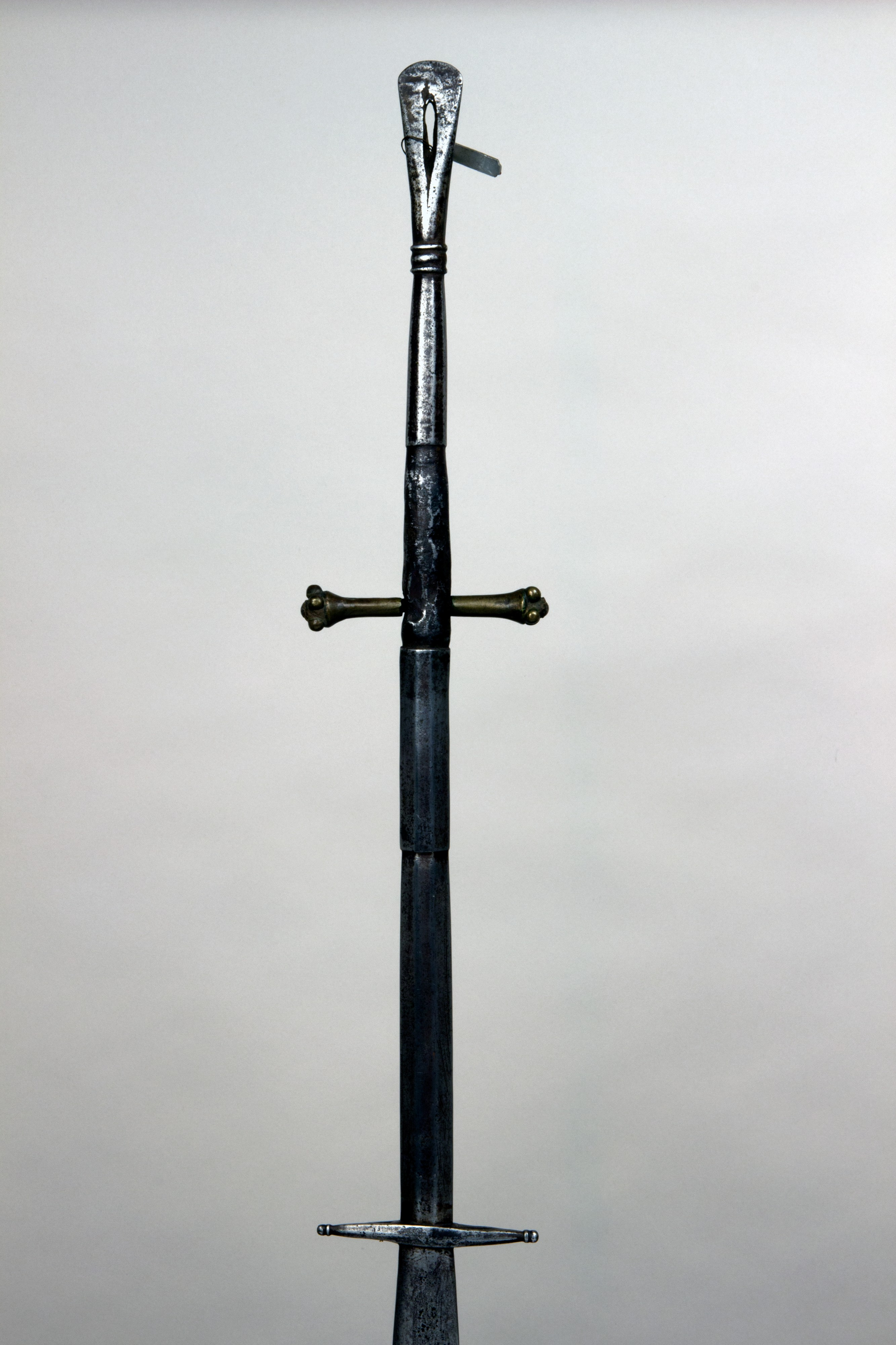
Indian Two-Handed Sword; from the Metropolitan Museum of Art; donated by George C. Stone, 1935

India was fertile ground for manufacturing technologies before the Industrial Revolution. The adoption of muskets became widespread under Akbar. When the Portuguese reached India in 1498, they brought firearms, including the matchlock musket. Expert armourers were plentiful, and they copied the weapons and adapted them for local use. These indigenous matchlocks were called Toradar. They were found mostly in Mughal-influenced Northern and Central India. One type of Toradar is slim, from 3–6 feet (91–183 cm) long and straight stock with a pentagonal-shaped section, and a light barrel. The other type is between 5–6 feet (150–180 cm) long, with a curved stock, diamond-shaped section, and heavy barrel, much enlarged at the breech.

From the time of Babur, cavalry troopers wore heavy, chain mail armour and acted as mounted archers armed with composite or steel bows. Composite bows were made of animal horn and sinews with around four feet long. When facing a difficult situation, the cavalrymen would fight using Utara, dismounting from their horses and fighting on foot until they died rather than retreat. Mughal armour was not as heavy as contemporaneous European armour, due to the hot climate, but was heavier than south Indian outfits.

== Cavalry ==
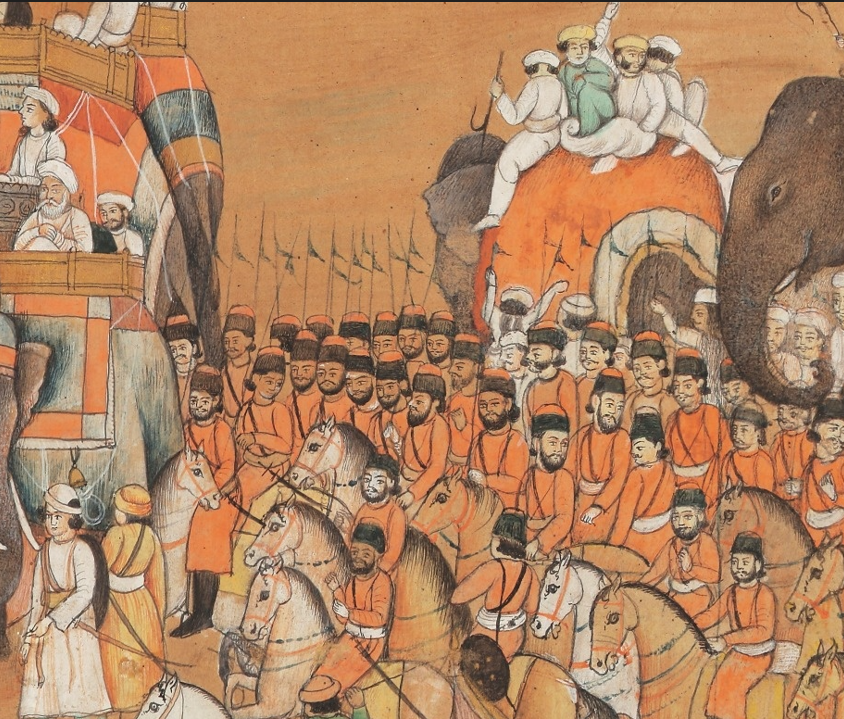
Cavalry in the Durbar Procession of Mughal Emperor Akbar II (reigned 1806–1837)

From the time of Babur, cavalry archery was a staple. Under Jahangir, the Mughals maintained 342,696 cavalry troopers. The Mughal army depended heavily on animals such as war elephants, warhorses, and bulls to transport their artillery.

André Wink claimed that cavalry warfare came to replace the logistically difficult elephant warfare and chaotic mass infantry assaults. Rajputs were co-opted by converting them into cavalry despite their traditions of fighting on foot. This was similar to the Marathas' role in the army of the Deccan Sultanates.

=== Horse ===
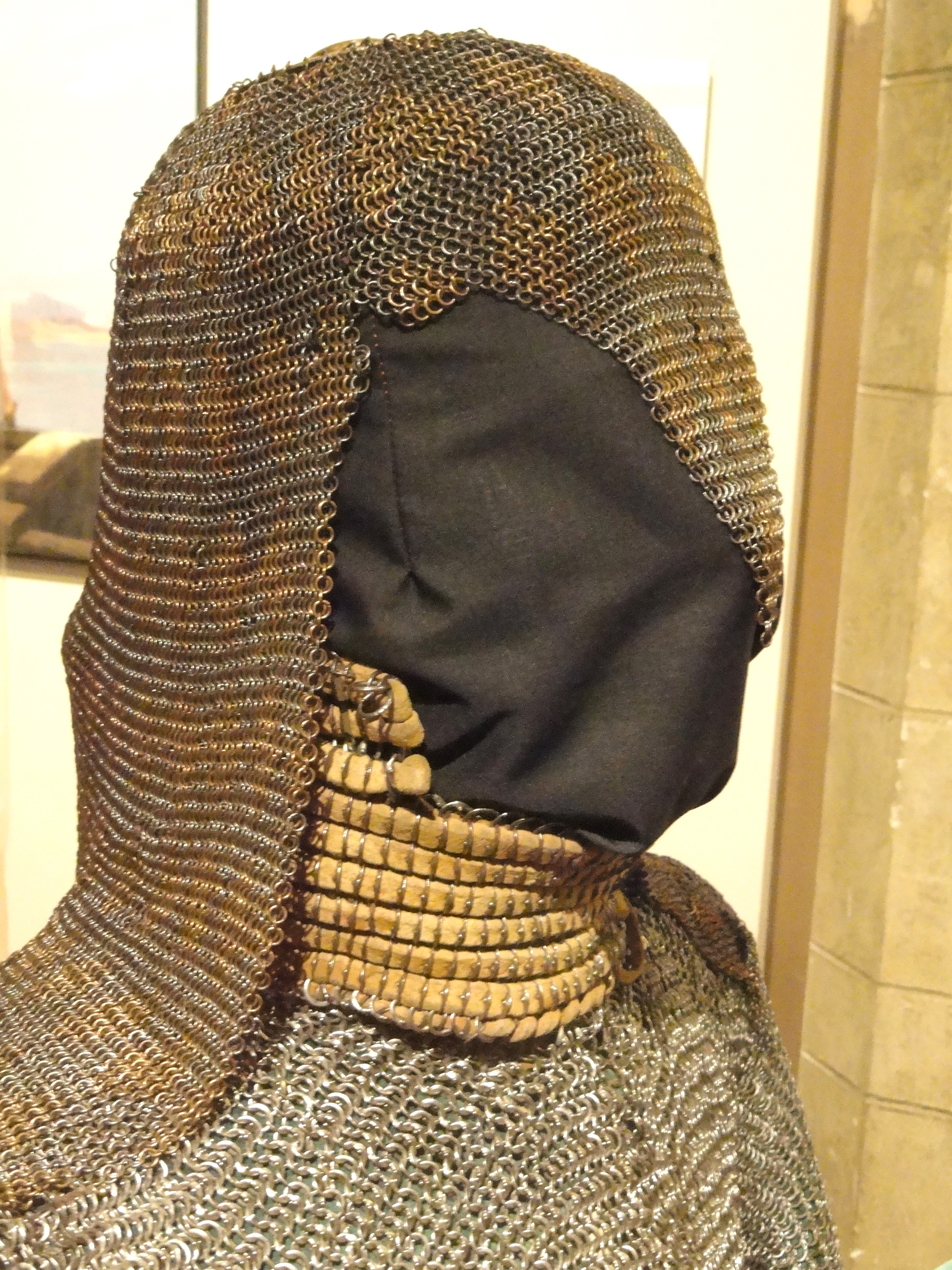
Mughal mail head defense, Lahore, dated from 1800s. exhibited by Higgins armoury Museum

Bargustawan mail and plate armour worn by horses were formed from three parts, a shaffron (head defence), crinet (neck defence) and combined peytral and crupper. Small plates edges are cusped and scalloped, giving the armour a geometric appearance. Panels of mail formed from alternating rows of solid and riveted links connects the rows. This arrangement accommodates radiating- pattern plates around circular plate edged with a brass border around the shoulders, flanks and neck areas of the armour.

The key to Mughal power was its use of warhorses and its control of the supply of superior warhorses from Central Asia. Historian Annemarie Schimmel estimated that around 75 percent of warhorses were imported. This aided the Mughal in the battles of Panipat, Machhiwara, Dharmat, reflected in eyewitness accounts such as that of Father Monserrate, which primarily featured the use of traditional Turko-Mongol horse archer tactics rather than gunpowder. The cavalrymen usually hailed from a high caste and were better paid than foot soldiers and artillerymen. They had to possess at least two of their own horses and good equipment.

The difference between Mughal heavy cavalry charge with their counterpart in European man-at-arms was the ability of the cavalryman to comfortably sit on their saddles during a top speed charge. Historian Jos Gommans recorded how the Mughals mocked the "European style" of cavalry charge. The regular cavalry troopers were directly recruited by the emperor, mainly from the emperor's blood relatives and tribesmen. They had their own payroll and paymaster, and were better paid than normal horsemen sowars.

Normally, the riders were armed with bows and arrows, maces, cavalry lances, sabres, swords, shields, and sometimes also rifles. Mughal cavalry armour was made of steel or leather, heavy chainmail, lamellar, or half-plate armour, while their horses also wore similar types of protection. The full set of their armour consisted of two layers; the first consisting of steel plates and helmets to secure the head, breast, and limbs. Underneath this steel network of armour was worn an upper garment of cotton or linen quilted thick enough to resist a sword or a bullet, which came down as far as the knees. There was also a custom among the riders to cover the body in protective garments until little beyond a man's eyes could be seen. Above all, they wore the traditional dress of their tribes, such as silken pants as the lower garment and a pair of kashmir shawls wrapped around the waist completed this costume. Furthermore, Giovanni Francesco Gemelli Careri testified about the magnificent gallop of the Mughal cavalier's charge, as they adorned their horse's saddles and head covers with gems or jewel stones.

The horse cavalry and musketeers recruited by mansabdars were required to meet the quality standards set by the emperor. The cavalry troopers in particular were riding the strong breeds of Tartary (central Asian) or Persian steeds which generally have larger bodies than most horses commonly found in contemporary India. The quality control regarding the imperial standard used Dagh (imperial mark) which branded on the side of the horse. The cavalry troops of the Mughals were also required to possess extra mounts as spares. Well-bred horses were either imported from Arabia, Iran and Central Asia, or bred in Sindh, Rajasthan and parts of Punjab. Emperors at times also issued firman or imperial mandates on regular intervals addressing officials like mansabdars, kotwals, zamindars and mutasaddis for the remission of taxes for promoting the horse trade. Meanwhile, the emperor and the high-ranking commanders using Arabian horses for their high quality. The Marathan lords of Thanjavur regularly sent tributes to the empire by sending Persian and Arabian horses.

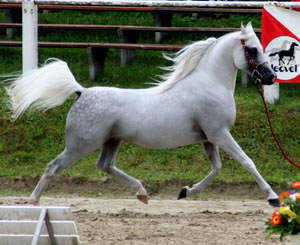
Purebreed Arabian stallion

Aside from the high quality purebreed Arabian, Iraq, Khurasan, and Central Asia steeds, the Mughal also bred lower quality warhorses. The systematic classification of horse quality in Mughal empire was started in 1595 and generally divided horses into several classes such as:

- Mujannas, mixed Arabian breed
- Yabus, mixed Turkish breed
- High quality native Indian breed from Sind, Balochistan, Kachchh
- Janglas, mid quality breed
- Tattus, a considered inferior breed
- Sanuji, local Punjab breed
- Gut, a western Himalaya breed with small bones
- Tanghan, an eastern Himalaya breed
- Pachwarya, a native Rajasthan breed

Depiction of Central Asian or Turkic horse

The most precious breeds of warhorse to the Mughals were:

- Iraqi variant of Arabian breed, which were considered by contemporary Mughals to be the best warhorse breed.
- Arabian-Persian mixed breed, for their endurance, speed, and mild temperament for training.
- Turkish breed, for their strength, greater stamina than Arabian breed, and long marches; this was considered the standard for a regular Mughal cavalry unit.

Stewart N. Gordon classified pre-colonial India into 3 zones of military culture. Southern India featured fortresses and light infantries, western India(such as the Marathas) basing their military forces on light cavalry, and the Mughals and Rajputs, relying on traditional heavy cavalry with feudalistic land revenue systems.

Tactically speaking, the Mughals were characterized by their frontal-combat oriented and shock-charge tactics. Heavy cavalry armed with swords and lances were popular in Mughal armies. The Mughal cavalry also trained in a special maneuver to attack enemies' war elephants, and could control their horses to stand on their hind legs and jump forward. The adversaries of the Mughals such as the Uzbeks employed their own cavalry archers to prevent the Mughal heavy cavalry from closing in. The Mughals also possessed their own cavalry archer units which were more effective than rifle armed cavalry, being able to shoot their arrows repeatedly while riding their horses. François Bernier observed that a Mughal cavalry archer was capable of unleashing 6 arrows before a riflemen could shoot twice.

In the Second Battle of Panipat, the Mughal army led by Ali Quli Khan Shaibani featured three sections of cavalry vanguard with the centre composed of 10,000 cavalry. This formation included Bairam Khan's detachment of Turks. There were unique characteristics among horse-cavalry troopers under the command of each Subahdar (Mughal provincial governor). According to the father of Shuja-ud-Daula, Safdar Jang, the governor of Awadh had adorned his contingent of 20,000 cavalry, who were mainly native Hindustan from the Jadibal district in Kashmir, with the uniform of Persian Qizilbash in dress and taught them to speak Persian language casually. Meanwhile, the Sadaat-e-Bara tribe of Urdu-speaking people which traditionally composed the vanguard of the imperial army, held the hereditary role f serving as vanguard units of the empire in battles.

=== Elephants ===
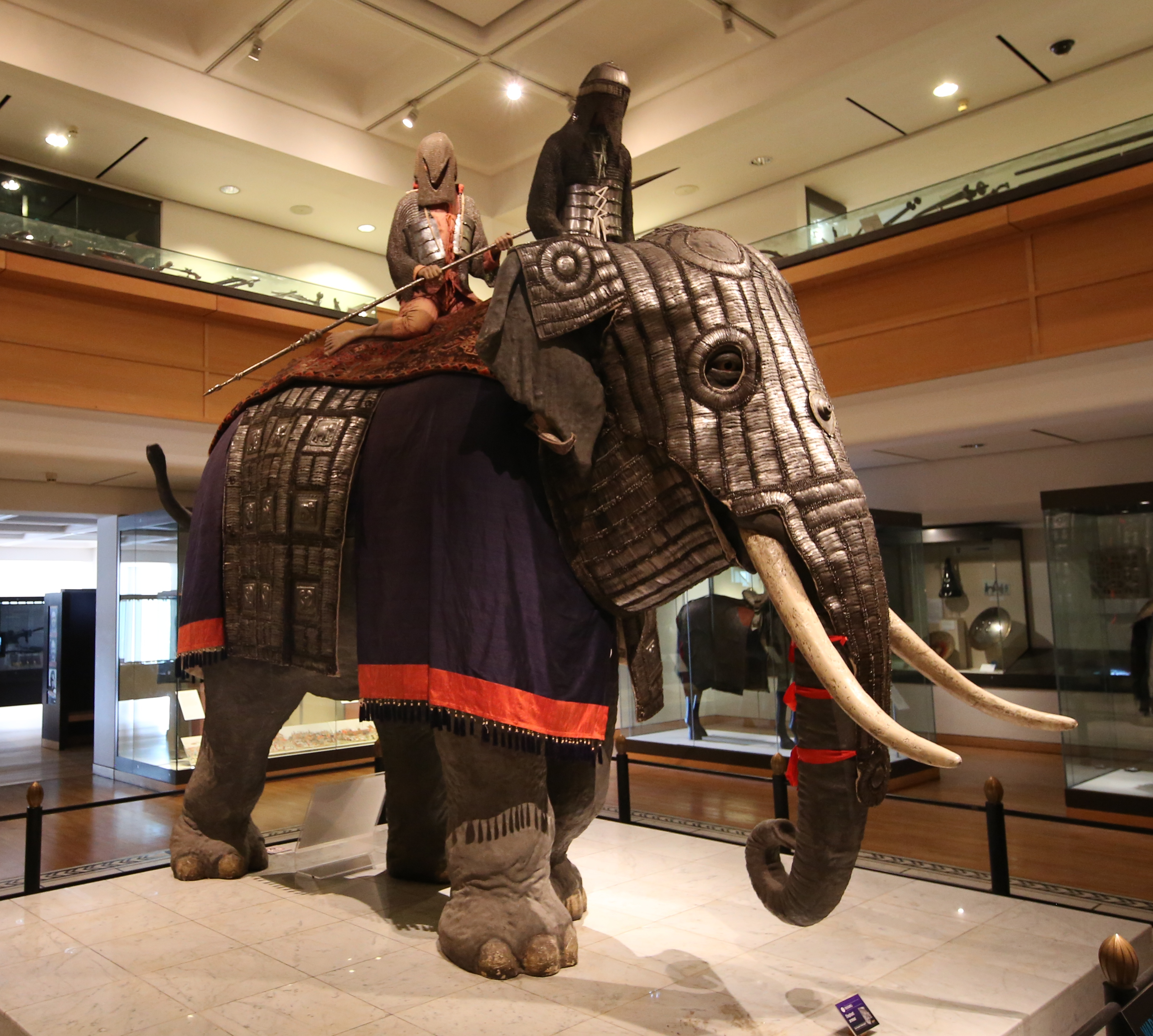
Side view Mughal Elephant Armour model from the late 16th-early 17th century

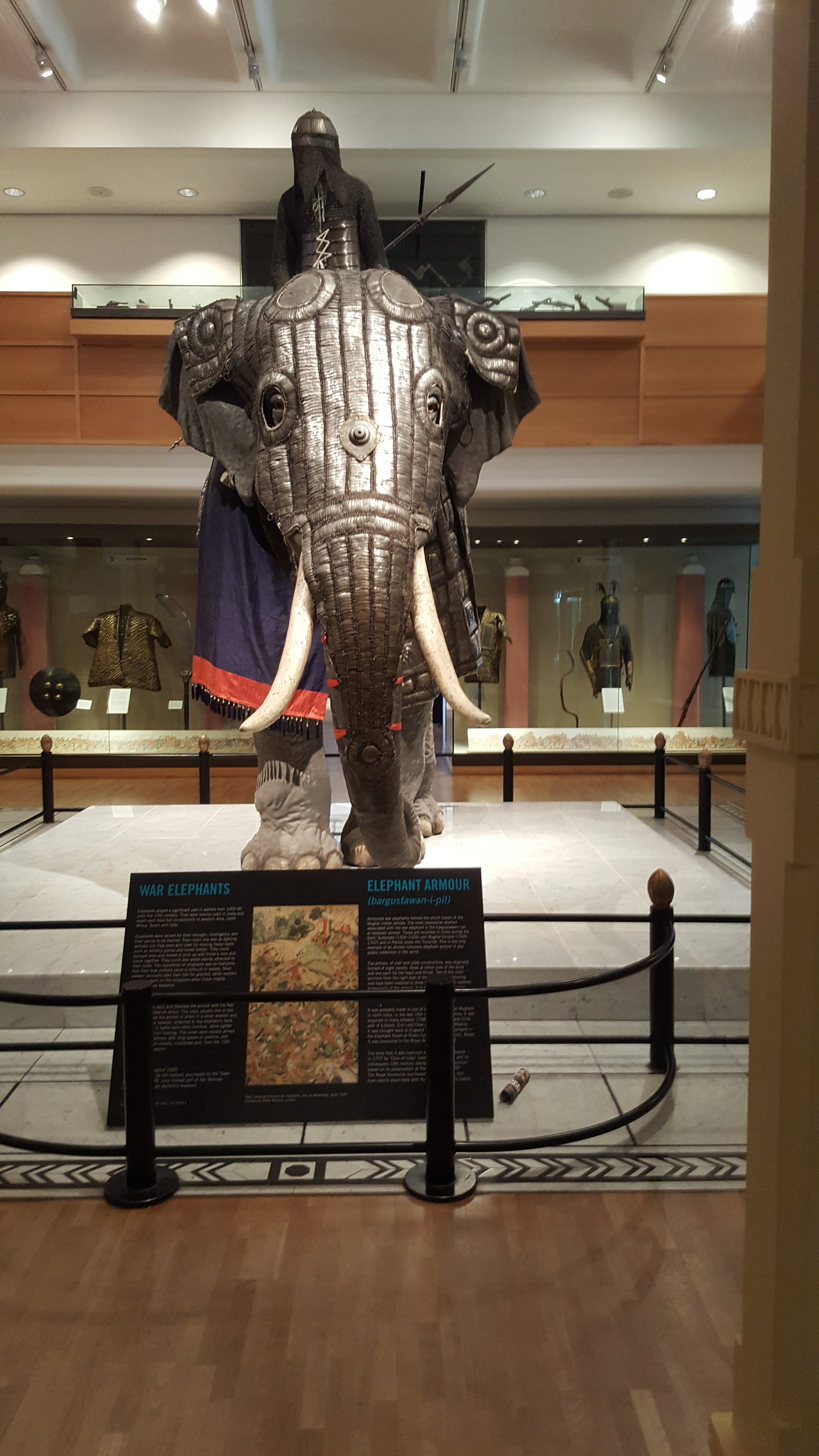
Front view Elephant Armour model from the late 16th-early 17th century. An elephant armour (bargustavan-i-pil) dates back to around 1600 and was brought from India by Lady Clive, wife of Edward, 2nd Lord Clive (Governor of Madras), to England in 1801. It is said to be the largest armour of animal displayed in any museum. Elephants usually deployed in the centre of the line, where they served role to Shield the army against the opposition's charge or conduxt one themselves.

Mughal army commanders led their troops atop an elephant, as the perch gave them good vision for giving orders. An elephant unit consisting of two riders atop a single elephant was known as Howdah. They were mainly used to carry heavy goods. Elephant riders in Indus river civilizations were typically called Mahout. The riders were natives of desert areas like Rajasthan. Female elephants usually were tasked to carry or drag baggage and siege cannons, while males were trained to fight.

In 1581, Catalan Jesuit Antoni de Montserrat recorded that Akbar had brought around 500 elephants and 28 field cannons to his battle against his brother Mirza Hakim. Montserrat testified to the supporting role of war elephants. In 1703, under Aurangzeb, Mughal commander Daud Khan Panni was recorded to have used 10,500 coins to purchase 30 to 50 war elephants from Ceylon. Akbar maintained around 5000 to 7000 elephants in his fil-khana (elephant house), of which about 100 of the best were reserved for his personal collection (khassa). The Mughals were more interested in maintaining war elephants than their predecessors, the Delhi sultans, who never had more than 3,000 elephants. They changed their tactics to include elephants. Akbar was a proponent of elephant warfare. Historian Shireen Moosvin estimated the elephant population at 5,000, while Raman Sukumar estimated that under Jahangir, numbers swelled from 12,000 to 40,000.

Gajnal elephant unit carried Indian swivel-guns on its back. Two of these guns could be carried by a single elephant.

Mughal's war elephants wore Bargustawan-i-pil armour. It consisted of chain mail and plate armour that weighed 118 kg. However war elephants were vulnerable to firearms. Mughal elephants bore substantial armour. it mostly protected the head and trunk. However, elephants ridden by high ranking figures typically were fully protected with chainmail, steel plates, sewn-scale or brigandine armour sets, although this was not typical. From the earliest times, war elephants assigned to the frontline served as basically unstoppable shock troops.

Vikram Aggarwal highlighted historical accounts and religious lore to illustrate elephant's significance to Mughal leadership, co-opting cultural symbols and underscoring the dynamic nature of culture and power, Elephants played a major role in the culture of South Asia, as they had been seen as a symbol of power and reverence since the Vedic period. The Mughals adopted elephant husbandry into their dynasty. Abul Fazl, author of Akbar's biography Akbarnama, stated that in Mughal society, the value of one well-conditioned elephant was equal to 500 horses. The empire had a regular supply of Sri Lankan elephants from the Marathan lords of Thanjavur.

=== Camel ===
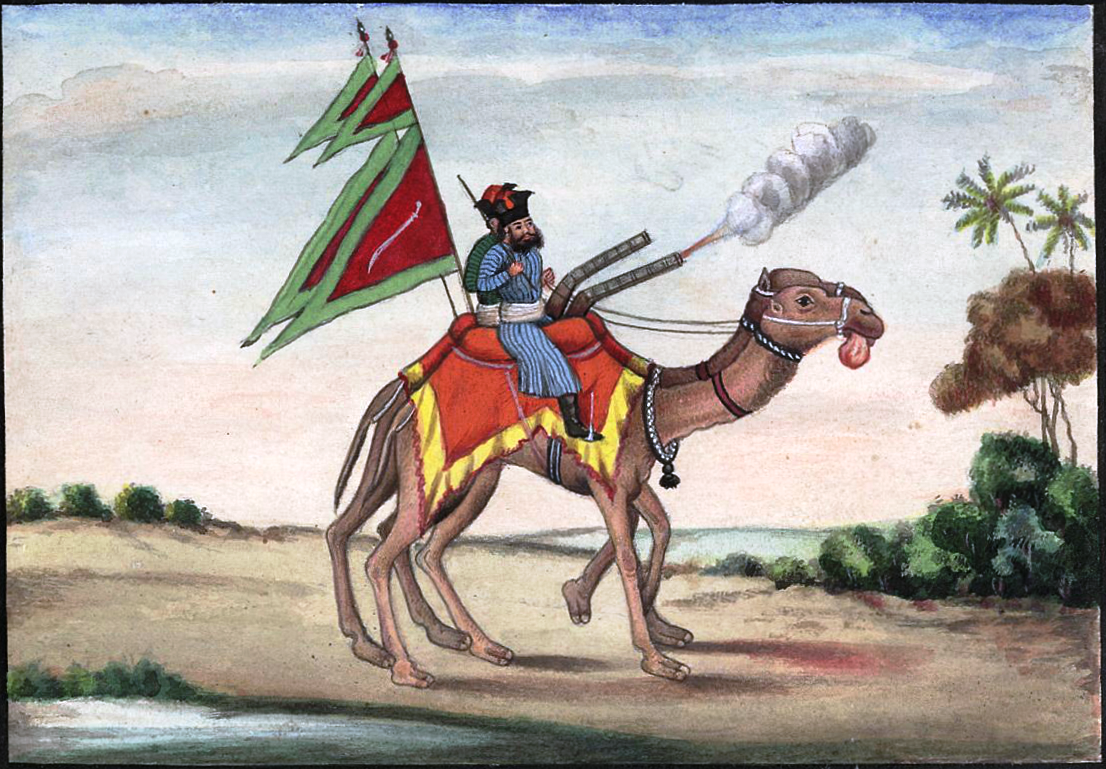
Mughal Zamburakchi

Some Rajput mansabdars provided camel cavalry. The Zamburaks or camel units carried mounted swivel guns and were thought to be a Mughal innovation. Bernier reported that Aurangzeb took two to three hundred camel-guns with him on his expedition to Kashmir. Their mobility compared to their Gajnal elephant counterparts was considered pivotal, as these weapons, double the size of normal muskets, could be shot from the camels. Zamburaks attached to the saddle of a camel and the ordnance typically measured in two haths and forty - six liva.

Akbar reportedly employed camel trainers from Baloch and Rabari ethnic in addition to his own camel corps that numbered around 6,000-7,000 camel riders.

== Infantry ==
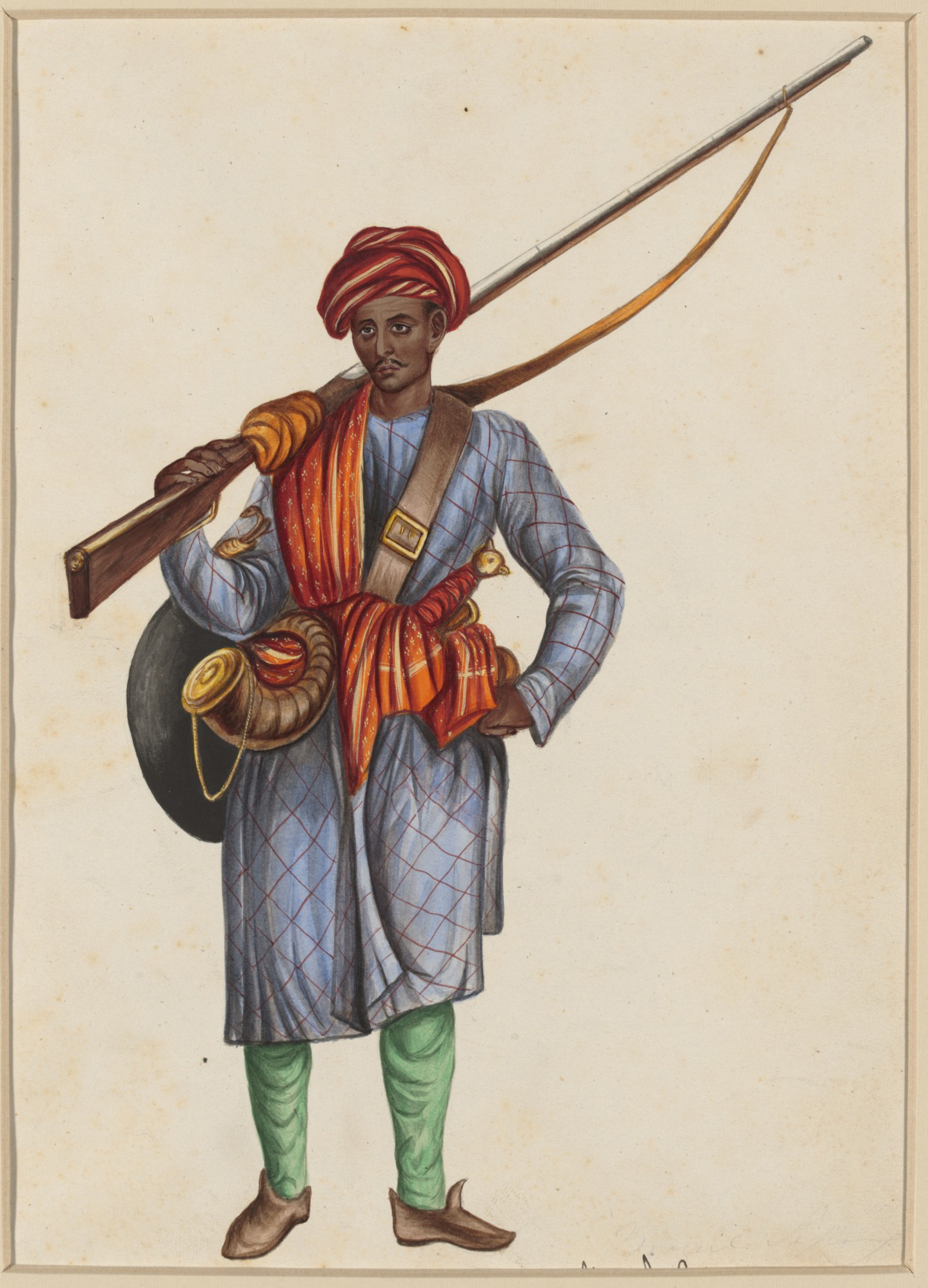
A Mughal infantryman

The infantry was recruited either by Mansabdars, or by the emperor. The emperor's infantry was called Ahsam. They were normally ill-paid, ill-equipped, and lacked discipline. This group included bandukchi or gun bearers, swordsmen, and servants and artisans. They used swords, shields, lances, clubs, pistols, rifles, muskets, etc. They normally wore no armour. Unlike the Europeans who placed wagon forts in their rear formations, the Mughals army placed their wagon in front of enemy centers with chains connecting the wagons to impede enemy cavalry charges. These wagon forts provided cover for the slow-loading Indian musketeers, while protecting heavy cavalry who positioned behind the direct-fire infantry.

=== Musketeer ===
Musket infantry (Banduqchis) units were generally more effective than archer infantry units and were the majority.

The musketeers line was able to break the enemy's elephant charges without help from cavalry units, as was demonstrated in the Battle of Haldighati and in the Battle of Tukaroi against cavalry and elephant charges, exploiting some level of combined arms with cavalry and artillery units. They were most useful in rural operations to subdue local insurrections.

Locally recruited and equipped with matchlocks, bows and spears, the infantry was held in low status and was virtually equated with palanquin bearers, woodworkers, and cotton carders in the army payrolls. Their matchlocks were one-third as fast as the mounted archers, and battle chronicles hardly mention them. Indian Muslims usually enlisted in the cavalry and seldom recruited in the infantry, as they regarded fighting with muskets with contempt. The Banduqchis were mainly made up of Hindus of various castes who developed skills as marksmen, such as the Bundelas, the Karnatakas and Buxar.

=== Heavy infantry ===
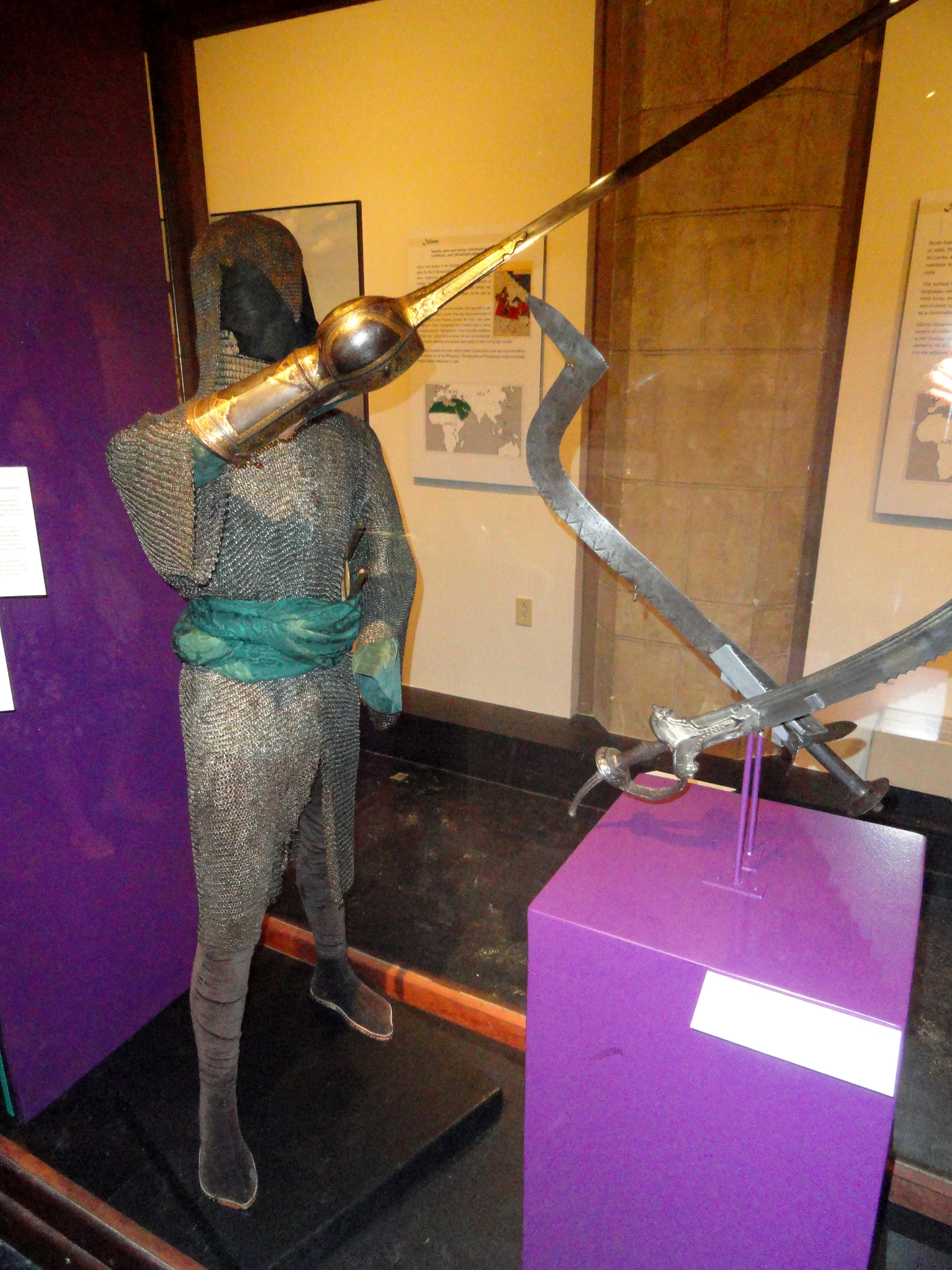
Mughal chainmail armour set with Pata gauntlet

The main infantry was supplemented by specialized units such as the Shamsherbaz (sword-wielders or gladiators, or swordsmen). The Shamsherbaz were elite heavy infantry companies of skilled swordsmen. Some were assigned to the court to serve as palace guards, or participate in mock-battles or exhibitions. Tens of thousands were assigned to army units by the Mansabdars. The Shamsherbaz were frequently used in siege warfare, unleashed to deal with any resistance once the walls were breached with explosives or artillery. They were divided into classes:

- Yak-hath: carried a single-handed weapon and a shield. Yak-hath soldiers originated from south India. Their shields could cover an entire horsemen, while those from other regions carried a smaller shield.
- Banaits: carried a curved longsword called Bankulis. Each hundred soldiers were commanded by a Ṣadī (lit. centurion), who hailed from an Ahadi noblemen. According to Abul Fazl, their salary was between 80 and 600 dāms.

Much of the Shamsherbaz were recruited from religious sects such as Sufi orders. Many Rajput tribesmen joined Shamserbaz units either as regular soldiers or as mercenaries. Chronicler Abul Fazl recorded that around 1,000 Shamsherbaz lived within the Mughal royal palace, of approximately 100,000 gladiators in total.

=== Archer ===
Infantry archers were called dākhilī. The emperor placed them under the command of manṣabdār officers. They usually had a salary of about 100-120 dāms. A captain of 10 archers was called a Mīr-dah officer, typically paid between 20 and 180 dāms. During Akbar's final years, the ratio of archers to musketeers was about 3 to 1. Archer units mainly filled a similar role as musketeer units.

Mridha archers were the elite class archers units hailing from the parts of Dhaka, Tangail, Bikrampur and Pirojpur.

=== Slave soldier ===
Chela were slave soldiers. As counterparts to the mercenaries, over whom commanders had a loose hold, commanders typically collected personal dependents or slaves. Such troops were known as chela (slave). They were fed, clothed, and housed by their owner. The mostly had been brought up and trained by the master. They were recruited chiefly from children taken in war or bought from their parents during famine. The great majority were of Hindu origin, who converted to Islam after they were enslaved. These units were the most dependably loyal in the force.

The Mughals, Timurids, and other Mongol-derived armies, and unlike other Islamic states did not use slave soldiers as their regular army. The Chela mainly worked as menial labor, footmen and low-level officers. Eunuch officers were particularly prized for their loyalty.

=== Female palace guards ===
Urdubegis were women assigned to protect the emperor and inhabitants of the Emperor's zenana, (harem). The women of the Mughal court were sequestered under purdah, so their living quarters were run entirely by women. The division of administrative tasks was dictated largely by Akbar, whose zenana numbered over 5,000 noble women and servants.

The women who protected the zenana were commonly of Habshi, Tatar, Turk and Kashmiri origin. Kashmiri women were selected because they did not observe purdah. Many were purchased as slaves.

They are mentioned as early as the reigns of Babur and Humayun, and were proficient in the lance and bow. Emperors spent a great deal of their leisure time in the zenana, and slept there. The women assigned to protect the women's quarters were part of the larger system to protect the emperor. During Babur's and Humayun's reign, when the Mughal throne was not consolidated, the harem was mobile, traveling with the Emperor. Accordingly, it was necessary to have trustworthy guards and thus, the army of Urdubegis was constituted. They accompanied the harem during excursions and sieges, and kept guard in the palace mansions were the Emperor's male soldiers were prohibited from entering. Warriors ascended the ranks, or were granted a promotion by the Emperor in return for a favour. For instance, Bibi Fatima, the only known Urdubegi, was first a wet-nurse in Humayun's period, but was promoted to the rank of an Urdubegi by Akbar.

Despite the large number of Urdubegis, the name of only one is known: Bibi Fatima. She is mentioned by Gulbadan-Begum, Humayun's half-sister, who wrote of her in his autobiography the Humayun-nama.

== Artillery ==
The Indian Muslims during the rule of Mughal maintained artillery dominance, and even after the fall of the empire, various other non-Islamic Indian kingdoms continued to recruit Hindustani Muslims as artillery officers in their armies.

Mughal artillery consisted of various types of cannons, light artillery, and grenadier units. The artillery was a specialized corps with its own designated commander, the Mir-i-Atish. The office of Mir-i-Atish grew in importance during the time of the later Mughals. Being in charge of the defense of the Imperial Palace Fort, and being in personal contact with the Emperor, the Mir-i-Atish commander had great influence. The Mughal artillery was somewhat risky to be used in the battlefield, since they exploded sometimes, killing the crew members. Light artillery was the most useful in the battlefield. They were mainly made up of bronze and drawn by horses. This also included swivel guns born by camels called zamburak.

One of the largest artillery pieces used by the Mughal army was employed during the Siege of Chittorgarh (1567–1568), where they used a gigantic Mortar designed by Persian engineer Fathullah Shirazi. This mortar was capable of firing a cannonball weighing over 3,000 pounds (1,400 kg). Another recorded mortar usage also recorded in 1659 during the conflict between Aurangzeb and his brother, Shah Shuja.

The Mughals also used rocket based weaponries. Emperor Akbar reportedly used metal cylinder rocket weapons known as bans against enemy war elephants, during the Battle of Sanbal. In 1657, the Mughal army also used rockets during the Siege of Bidar. Aurangzeb's forces reportedly used rockets and grenades while scaling the walls. Some miscellaneous rocket artillery engine was also employed by the Mughal artillery corps, such as one which recorded by chronicler Abul Fazl, which modern historian Andrew de la Garza described as resembling German nebelwerfer artillery.

The Mughals artillery corps also employed hand grenades and rocket artilleries. These rockets are considered to be the predecessor of Mysorean rockets employed by Hyder Ali and Tipu Sultan Pradeep Barua also noted that the Mughal technology for sapping and mining warfare saw small improvements from the Delhi sultanates which ruled India before them.

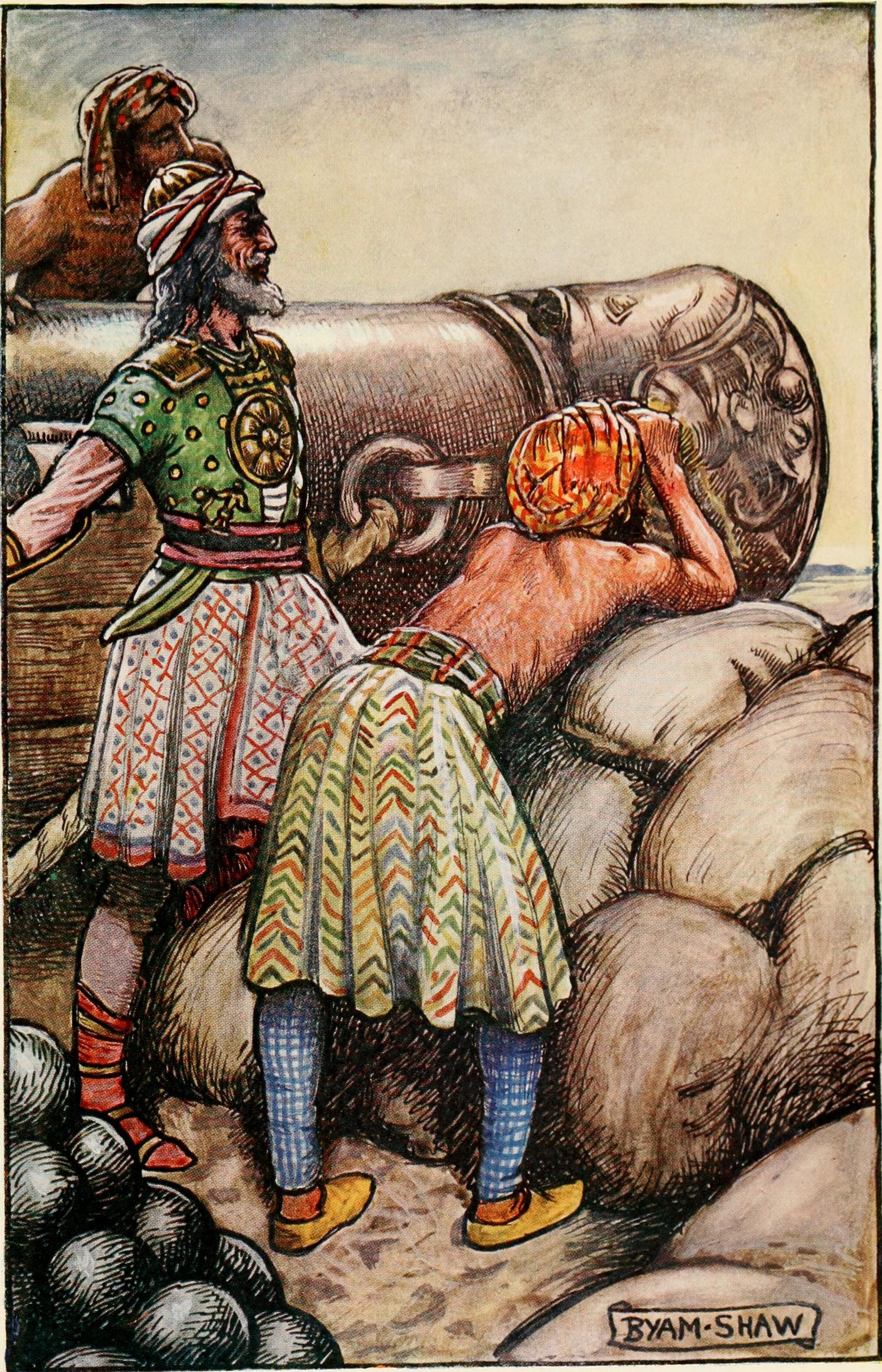
depiction of Mughal artillery during the reign of Akbar

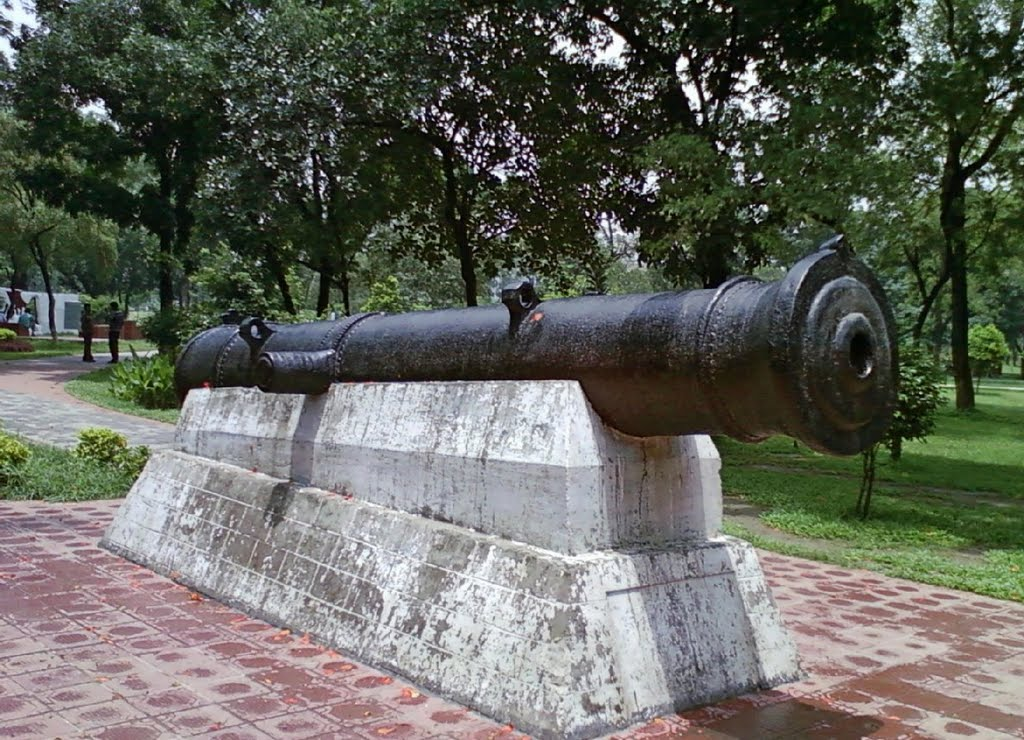
Mughal-era Cannon

== Naval forces ==
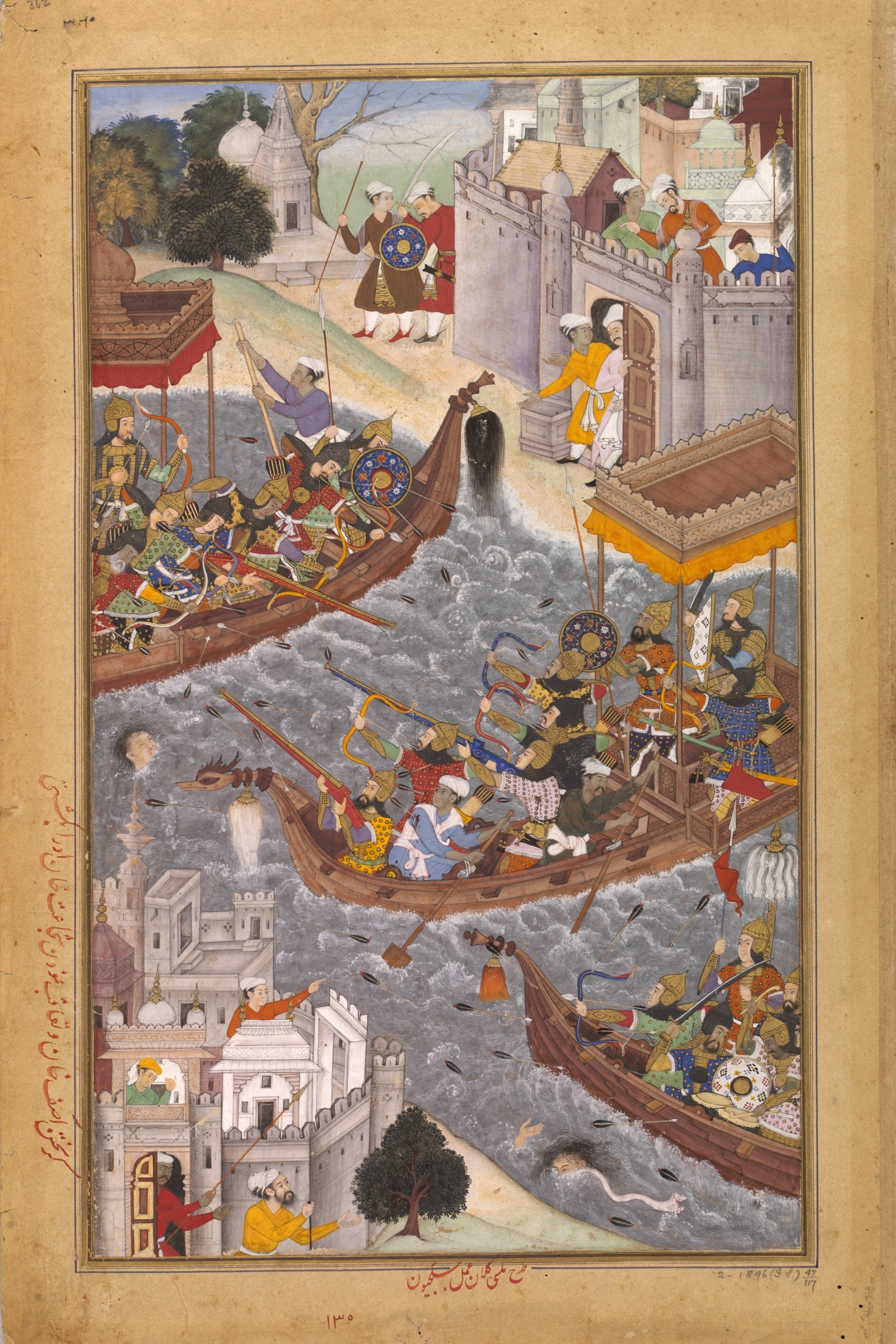
1565-Battle Scene with Boats on the Ganges-Akbarnama

The Mughals also maintained a considerable navy, known as the Amla-e-Nawara. In Dhaka alone, the fleet numbered 768 ships, including 933 sailors of Portuguese origin and 8,112 artillery personnel in the east. To support the maritime operations, Mughal grand vizier Mir Jumla repaired and fortified three river forts: Hajiganj Fort, Sonakanda Fort, and Idrakpur Fort between 1660 and 1663. The Navy's main duty was controlling piracy, but it was sometimes used in war. It is known from the standard survey of maritime technology in 1958, that Bengali expertise on shipbuilding was duplicated by the British East India Company in the 1760s, leading to significant improvements in seaworthiness and navigation for European ships during the Industrial Revolution. Among them, there are 923 Portuguese sailors in service of Akbar.

=== Ships ===
According to records on the Mughal invasion of the kingdom of Ahom, the characteristic warships of Mughals in the Bengal regions were Ghurab warships which were outfitted with 14 guns. Their personnels numbered 50 to 60 crew members. The officers of these ships were conscripted from Dutch, Portuguese, British, and Russian naval officers.

Another characteristic of Mughal warships were their strength and their size, due to the shipbuilding skills of their Bengali shipbuilders. Contrary to the naval forces in Bengal which relied mostly on riverine fitted Gharb warships, the naval forces of Janjira state which were subsidised by Aurangzeb and access to the port of Surat could construct more large ships like frigates and men-of-war. The man-of-war ships of the Mughals were as large as English third-rate ships, while the frigates used prows instead of beakheads. Some of these ships carried thirty to forty pieces of cannons. This navy included rare huge vessels with certain craft weighing between 300 and 400 tons and equipped with heavy ordnance on row boats, where a few matchlock gunners and spearmen were cramped. The use of hand-driven pumps to remove excessive water from boats was already used by Indian shipmasters in the seventeenth century. However, larger imperial ships were also operated by Mughals such as the Rahīmī, which reached 1500 tons. Dilip Kumar Chakrabarti also noted the existence of ships belonging to the emperor weighing 1000 tons. Another notable huge ship owned by the Mughals was the Ganj-i-Sawai, which had 800 onboard guns at its disposal. Ganj-i-Sawai was reported as the largest ship in Surat at that time, with its 1600 tonnes in weight.

=== Naval history ===
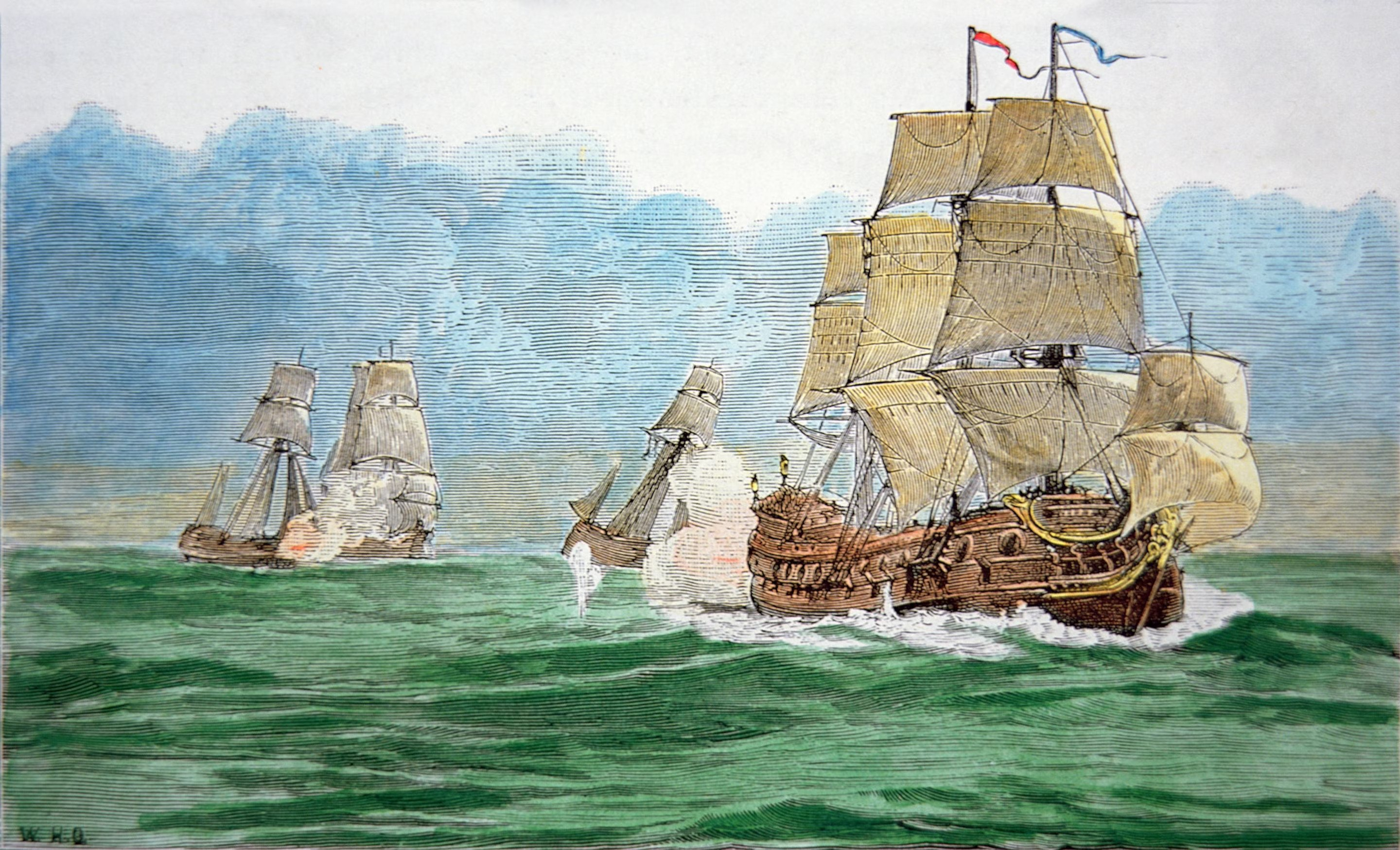
The Ganj-i-Sawai, one of the largest armed trade ships in the 17th century.

For the two decades at the end of the 16th century, during their operations in Bengal, the Mughals faced difficulties due to the rainy climate and the geography of Bengal, which contains large portions of the Ganges River delta, resulting in any attempts for military conquest turning into amphibious operations. Their opponents were local warlords, who owned large quantities of warships. The locals were also assisted by the pirates from the Portuguese Goa region, along with some Dutch ships, although some of the Portuguese instead assisted the Mughal empire.

The Mughal amphibious forces also operated in muddy terrains, such as when Ghiyas Khan led an operation against Udayaditya of the Jessore Kingdom. To further improve their operations in wet terrains, the Mughals leveraged local Bengalese fortress construction techniques to build a number of cheap, river-dedicated fortresses which were built with the abundance of mud in the region. Soon, the imperial naval strategy focused on the mobility of their ships whose tracks were defended by these river forts. Grand vizier Mir Jumla also constructed land-based defensive installations to put on those floating river forts. These were constructed by lashing ships, while large rafts enabled the Mughal soldiers to fight on water. Heavy artillery pieces were brought on board rafts to supplement the existing ones, while wagons lashed to decks and stacks of crates or bales of straw and cotton formed makeshift fortifications.

The foundation of the salt water naval force of the Mughals was established by Akbar from the late 16th century after he conquered Bengal and Gujarat. Emperor Akbar reorganized the imperial navy from a collections of civilian vessels to more professional institutions of naval administration; this is detailed in the Ain-i-Akbari, the annals of Akbar's reign. The annals identify the navy's primary objectives as being the maintenance of transport and combat vessels, the retention of skilled seamen, protection of civilian commerce and the enforcement of tolls and tariffs. Akbar was recorded in A'in Mir Bahri, to be possessed of 3000 armed vessels, although this later decreased to 768. In early 1600, the Mughals employed local Bengali warriors as their naval force. these Nawwara is a Bengal local warlords. These locals consisted of the twelve chiefs of Baro-Bhuyan military confederacy, and were responsible for shipbuilding, commercial trade, slave raids, and military protection. The Mughals assigned these local warlords to naval positions and gave uncultivated lands to them.

About 20 years after the Siege of Hooghly, the Mughals in Bengal came into a conflict with English East India. The Mughal forces were commanded by Shaista Khan and Masum Khan, the eldest son of Musa Khan and grand son of Isa khan, former enemies of the Mughals in Bengal during the reign of Akbar. Masum served as the Mughal army's general during the Hughly invasion in 1632. The English company under Admiral Nicholson, who had been granted permission by the emperor to sail about 10 warships, aimed to seize Chittagong and consolidate its interests. However, the English were defeated by the Mughal counterattack under Shaista Khan towards Hooghly.

Empress Mariam-uz-Zamani maintained large fleets of trade ships, including the Rahīmī and Ganj-i-Sawai. The Rahimi was the largest of the Indian ships trading in the Red Sea. It had large sails that were identifiable to sailors from miles away, and was known to Europeans as the great pilgrimage ship. After being sacked by pirates, this ship was replaced by the Ganj-i-Sawa. This ship was eventually sacked by English pirate Henry Every.

The Mughal Empire's naval forces also engaged in maritime cooperation with the Ottoman Empire to counter Portuguese dominance in the 16th-century Indian Ocean. Giancarlo Casale's The Ottoman Age of Exploration highlights that Ottoman fleets, such as during the 1538 Diu siege, relied on logistical support from Surat, a key Mughal port after 1573. The Journal of the Economic and Social History of the Orient notes Surat's role as a trade and logistical hub, where local sailors aided Ottoman efforts against the Portuguese. Seydi Ali Reis's Mir'āt ül-Memālik records Surat's sailors providing supplies and navigation aid to Ottoman fleets in 1554, integrating Mughal naval efforts into a broader Islamic maritime network.

On November 9, 1665, Mughal commander Abul Hussain, under Shaista Khan, attacked Sandwip Island from Dhaka to oust 80-year-old pirate ruler Dilawar Khan (Raja Dilal), who had held it independently for around 50 years. Wounded in the clash, Hussain retreated to Noakhali as an Arakanese fleet approached but withdrew. Reinforcements of 141 boats, 1,500 musketeers/gunners, and 400 cavalry under Jamal Khan and others arrived. On November 18, the Mughals captured wounded son Sharif Khan and Dilawar after fierce fighting, imprisoning them in Dhaka. This bloody victory, aided by Dutch and Portuguese defectors, secured a base for Chittagong.

In the same year, during the conflict against the kingdom of Arakan in December, Aurangzeb dispatched Shaista Khan, his governor of Bengal to command 288 vessels and more than 20,000 men to pacify the pirate activities within Arakan territory and to capture Chittagong, assisted by about 40 Portuguese vessels. Ibn Hussain, Shaista Khan's admiral, was asked to lead the navy, while the subahdar himself took up the responsibility of supplying provisions for the campaign. He also ordered Farhad Khan and Mir Murtaza to take the land route, while the overall command was given to Buzurg Umed Khan, a son of Shaista Khan. The Mughals and the Portuguese held sway in the following naval battle. The conquered territory to the western bank of Kashyapnadi (Kaladan river) was placed under direct imperial administration. The name of Chittagong was changed to Islamabad and it became the headquarters of a Mughal faujdar. This ensuing conflict in Chittagong was documented as the largest galley battle of the Early Modern period, involving more than 500 ships and claiming more than 40,000 lives. After the Mughals took Chittagong, the Portuguese moved to the Ferengi Bazaar in Dhaka. Descendants of the Portuguese still reside in these places.

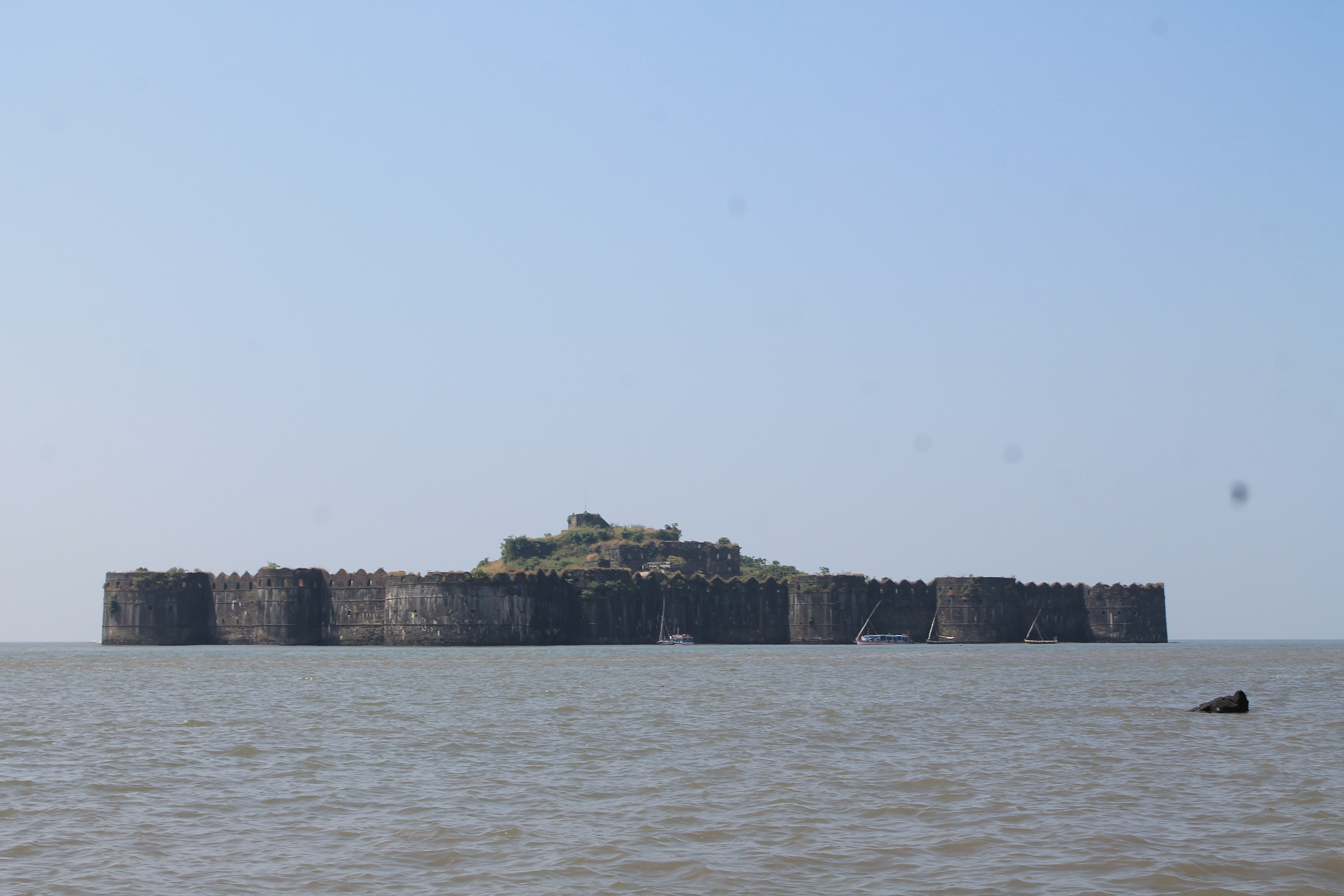
Murud-Janjira, a semi independent island fort which allied to the Mughals.

It is said in the Ahkam 'Alamgiri record that the commander of British navy, Sir John Child, concluded peace with the Mughals in 1689 due to his fear of the "Mughal navy" force of Janjira which let by Siddi Yaqub. According to Grant Duff, until 1670 the imperial navy under the leadership of Shah Jahan with the Janjira mariners has clashed frequently against Maratha Navy under Shivaji, where the Janjira and Mughal naval forces always comes victorious. English letters in 1672 record that Aurangzeb sent 30 small frigates to assist the Siddis in Danda-Rajapuri. The resulting battle caused the Shivaji naval forces to be burned and 50 ships to be lost. Khafi Khan also records that the Mughal fleet once inflicted heavy losses on the Maratha naval forces during the reign of Shah Jahan, capturing 200 while suffering only 100 casualties. This fuelled the rivalry of the Siddis with the Maratha in the sea.

During the era of Aurangzeb, the chronicle of Ahkam 'Alamgiri reveals how the Mughals had struggled to establish a strong navy, spurred by the failure to prevent losses of Muslim vessels off the coast of the Maldives islands. Aurangzeb was said to possess four huge vessels at Surat and the port of southern Gujarat. Aurangzeb's Vizier, Jafar Khan, blames the Mughal lack of ability to establish an effective navy not on the lack of resources and money, but on the lack of men to direct (the vessels). Thus, Syed Hassan Askari concluded that the lack of priority of Aurangzeb to afford his naval project due to his conflicts against the Maratha hindered his ability to do so.

Andrew de la Garza stated that the other reason why the Mughal navy did not evolve into a high seas fleet during the 17th century was the technological inferiority of Indian blast furnaces in comparison with their European counterparts, which were capable of creating the high temperatures required to manufacture cast iron cannons in quantity. Nevertheless, Syed maintained that the Mughals were not independently able to control rampant piracy and European naval incursions, instead depending on the strength of friendly Arab forces from Muscat to keep the Portuguese in check. Alternative explanation were offered by Michael Naylor Pearson, as he and other historians suggested that the Portuguese were actually posing no real threat to the Hajj expeditions during the reign of Aurangzeb. Umar Ryad highlighted the fact that the Portuguese typically did not dare to attack armadas of pilgrims sponsored by the Mughal empire, since they were heavily protected with many military personnel in each ship.

However, Syed Hassan also highlighted that Aurangzeb did not completely neglect the Mughal navy as he had acquired British expertise to strengthen the fort of Janjira island, while also establishing naval cooperation with semi independent Siddi community naval force of Janjira State which resisted the Marathas. The proficiency of the Siddi Yaqub navy is exemplified during Siege of Bombay, where Siddi Yaqub and his Mappila fleet blockaded the fortress and forced the submission of the British forces. In the late 1600s, Sidi Yaqut received a subsidy of 400,000 rupees from emperor Aurangzeb to manage Murud-Janjira He also owned large ships which weighed 300–400 tons. According to records, these ships were unsuitable for fighting on the open sea against European warships, but their size allowed for transporting soldiers for amphibious operations. Reports from travellers has noted that Mughal general Mir Jumla II was employing the services the sailors from British, the Dutch, and the Portuguese, along their ships. In August, 1660, he employed 6–7 British sailors of a small vessel carrying Trevisa, the English Agent, to Dhaka. He also utilised the services of both the Dutch and the British for constructing his warships as it is recorded a galiot built by the Dutch at Hooghly district and manned by 6–7 British fugitives under a captain named John Durson. Furthermore, Mir Jumla also employing a Britishman named Thomas Pratt to construct boats and making ammunition for riverine warfare During the tenure of Mughal general Mir Jumla in Bengal, he employed Portuguese, English, and Dutch sailors to operate his 323 warships. After the death of Mir Jumla, Shaista Khan launched conquest of Chittagong in 1666, where he employing the fleet of ships belonging local warlords group in Bengal, which called Nawwara, to overcome the turbulent water frontier of the region.

== Decline of the army ==
The army's strength rested on the bargain between the emperor and his mansabdars, and its decline was at root a change in that relationship. For roughly a century after Akbar the political compromise between the crown and its officers had assured their loyalty and service; as it frayed in the eighteenth century, the military structure built upon it weakened with it.

A weakness was built into the system from the outset. The number of horsemen a noble actually fielded, fixed by his sawar rank, never exceeded and was usually much lower than his personal zat rank, so that a mansabdar graded "1000/500" carried the title of a commander of a thousand but kept only half that many troopers. The real contingent was cut further by a "rule of one-third, one-fourth or one-fifth", under which only a fraction of the nominal sawar figure had to be maintained. The musters and horse-branding meant to guarantee real soldiers were steadily relaxed and widely disregarded, as nobles diverted contingent pay to personal use and were rarely punished; the gap between paper strength and real strength was a standing feature of the army rather than a late abuse.

Because pay and contingents were funded from revenue assignments (jagirs), the army's strength was hostage to revenue collection, and interruptions in it had serious effects on the fighting strength and operational capability of the army. The jagirdari system had worked tolerably well down to the middle of Aurangzeb's reign, but the long Deccan campaigns of his last decades overstrained it, leaving too few productive assignments for a swelling number of claimants.

By the eve of Nader Shah's invasion the institutions and norms that had regulated the Mughal system had reached near-total collapse, and effective power at the centre had passed from the emperor to contending groups of nobles. In 1739 the enfeebled central government could not resist the Persian conqueror Nader Shah, whose invasion and sack of Delhi exposed how little remained of imperial military power. Provincial governors and tributary chiefs, who had always kept semi-autonomous forces within the imperial framework, converted them into the standing armies of effectively independent successor states as central authority receded, and the single imperial host fragmented.

The Mughal way of war was also being overtaken. Historians have observed that the empire fell behind in military technology over the seventeenth century, its field artillery in particular remaining poor by European standards. The spread of cheap muskets among the peasantry prompted the creation of new corps of mounted musketeers, while the rise of disciplined, European-trained infantry shifted the advantage away from the heavy cavalry on which the Mughals had relied; responses to the new infantry varied across the subcontinent, with rulers such as the Nizam readily embracing it.

== See also ==
- Battles of the Mughal Empire
- List of battles involving the Mughal Empire
- Tipu Sultan
- Sir John Child
- Yahya Saleh

== Bibliography ==
=== Book ===
- Abdul Sabahuddin; Rajshree Shukla (2003). Mughal Strategy of War (Hardcover). Global Vision Publishing House. ISBN 9788187746997.
- Eraly, Abraham (2000) [First published 1997]. Emperors of the Peacock Throne: The Saga of the Great Moghuls. Penguin Books. ISBN 978-0-14-100143-2.
- Ali, Syed Murtaza (1965). হযরত শাহ জালাল ও সিলেটের ইতিহাস (in Bengali). Dhaka: Bangla Academy.
- Ali Khan, Zulfiqar (1925). Sher Shah Suri, Emperor of India. Lahore: Civil and Military Gazette Press.
- Eraly, Abraham (2007). The Mughal World: Life in India's Last Golden Age. Penguin Books. p. 291. ISBN 978-0-14-310262-5.
- Andrew de la Garza (2016). The Mughal Empire at War Babur, Akbar and the Indian Military Revolution, 1500-1605. Taylor & Francis. ISBN 978-1-317-24531-5.
- Banerji, S.K. (1938). Humāyun Bādshāh. Calcutta: Oxford University Press. OCLC 952877148.
- Barua, Pradeep (2005). Grimsley, Mark (ed.). The State at War in South Asia Studies in War, Society, and the Military. Ohio State University; University of Nebraska–Lincoln. p. 47.
- Bhattacharya, Sabyasachi (2020). A Comprehensive History of Modern Bengal, 1700-1950. Asiatic Society. ISBN 978-93-89901-95-5.
- Bhattacherje, S. B. (2009). Encyclopaedia of Indian Events & Dates. Sterling Publishers. ISBN 978-81-207-4074-7. Archived from the original on 21 January 2024.
- Burn, Richard, ed. (1960) [1937]. The Cambridge History of India, Volume IV: The Mughal Period. Planned by Wolseley Haig. Cambridge University Press.
- Campbell, James Macnabb (1896). "Chapter II. ÁHMEDÁBÁD KINGS. (A. D. 1403–1573.), Chapter III. MUGHAL VICEROYS. (A.D. 1573–1758)". In James Macnabb Campbell (ed.). History of Gujarát. Gazetteer of the Bombay Presidency. Vol. I(II). The Government Central Press. pp. 266–274. This article incorporates text from this source, which is in the public domain.
- Chandra, Satish (2005) [First published 1999]. Medieval India: from Sultanat to the Mughals. Vol. II (Revised ed.). New Delhi: Har-Anand Publications. ISBN 978-81-241-1066-9.
- Chandra, Satish (2007). History of Medieval India. New Delhi: Orient Longman. ISBN 978-81-250-3226-7.
- Dirk H. A. Kolff (2002). Naukar, Rajput, and Sepoy: The Ethnohistory of the Military Labour Market of Hindustan, 1450-1850 (illustrated, reprint, revised). Cambridge University Press. ISBN 9780521523059.
- Francis Robinson (2009). ムガル皇帝歴代誌 [Chronicles of the Mughals] (in Japanese). 創元社. p. 242. ASIN 4422215205.
- Francisco Bethencourt; Cátia A.P. Antunes (2022). Merchant Cultures A Global Approach to Spaces, Representations and Worlds of Trade, 1500–1800. Brill. ISBN 9789004506572.
- Gahir, Sunita; Spencer, Sharon, eds. (2006). Weapon - A Visual History of Arms and Armor. New York City: DK Publishing. ISBN 9780756622107.
- Habib, Irfan (1997). Akbar and His India. New Delhi: Oxford University Press. ISBN 978-0-19-563791-5.
- Hasan, Samiul, ed. (2012). The Muslim world in the 21st century : space, power, and human development. New York: Springer. ISBN 978-94-007-2632-1.
- Hodgson, Marshall G. S. (1974). The Venture of Islam: Conscience and History in a World Civilization'. Chicago: University of Chicago Press. ISBN 978-0-226-34677-9.
- Jeremy Black (1996). The Cambridge Illustrated Atlas of Warfare: Renaissance to Revolution, 1492-1792, Volume 2 (Illustrated ed.). Cambridge University Press. p. 37. ISBN 0521470331.
- Jorge Flores (2015). The Mughal Padshah: A Jesuit Treatise on Emperor Jahangir's Court and Household. Volume 6 of Rulers & Elites. Brill. p. 74. ISBN 978-9004307537.
- Jos J. L. Gommans (2002). Mughal Warfare Indian Frontiers and Highroads to Empire, 1500-1700 (Paperback). Routledge. ISBN 978-0-415-23989-9.
- Konstantin Nossov (Константин Носов) (2012). War Elephants. Bloomsbury Publishing. ISBN 978-1846038037. Author link=* Konstantin Georgievich Nossov
- Iqtada Alam Khan (2004). Gunpowder and Firearms: Warfare in Medieval India. Oxford University Press. ISBN 0195665260.
- J. C. Sharman (2019). Empires of the Weak: The Real Story of European Expansion and the Creation of the New World Order. Princeton University Press. ISBN 978-0691182797.
- Jenkins, Everett Jr (2015). The Muslim Diaspora (Volume 2, 1500-1799): A Comprehensive Chronology of the Spread of Islam in Asia, Africa, Europe and the Americas. McFarland. ISBN 978-1-4766-0889-1. Archived from the original on 11 January 2024.
- Melo, João Vicente (2022). Jesuit and English Experiences at the Mughal Court, C. 1580–1615 (ebook). Springer International Publishing. ISBN 9783030965884.
- Mahajan, Vidya Dhar (1968). India Since 1526 (8th ed.). S. Chand.
- Muzaffar H. Syed (1905). History of Indian Nation : Medieval India. K. K. Publications. ISBN 81-7844-132-2.
- Sarkar, Jagadish Narayan (1951). The Life of Mir Jumla, the General of Aurangzab (PDF). Indira Gandhi National Centre for the Arts. Archived (PDF) from the original on 14 October 2023.
- Prasad, Beni (1930) [1922]. History of Jahangir (2nd ed.). Allahabad: The Indian Press.
- Prasad, Ishwari (1974). The Mughal Empire. Allahabad: Chugh Publications. OCLC 1532660.
- Puri, B. N.; Das, M. N. (2003). A Comprehensive History of India: Comprehensive history of medieval India. Sterling Publishers Pvt. Ltd. ISBN 978-81-207-2508-9.
- Richards, John F. (1996). The Mughal Empire. Cambridge University Press. ISBN 978-0-521-56603-2.
- Rizvi, S. N. H. (1969). East Pakistan District Gazetteers: Dacca. East Pakistan Government Press.
- Roy, Kaushik (2011). War, Culture and Society in Early Modern South Asia, 1740-1849 (Volume 3 Asian States and Empires ed.). Taylor & Francis. ISBN 978-1-136-79087-4.
- Roy, Kaushik (6 October 2015). Military Manpower, Armies and Warfare in South Asia (ebook). Taylor & Francis. ISBN 978-1-317-32128-6.
- Roy, Kaushik (2015b). Warfare in Pre-British India - 1500BCE to 1740CE. Routledge. ISBN 978-1-317-58691-3.
- Kaushik Roy; Peter Lorge (17 December 2014). Chinese and Indian Warfare - From the Classical Age to 1870 (ebook). Taylor & Francis. p. 196. ISBN 978-1-317-58710-1.
- Roy, Atul Chandra (1968). History of Bengal: Mughal Period, 1526-1765 A.D. Calcutta: Nababharat Publishers.
- Atul Chandra Roy (1972). A history of Mughal navy and naval warfares. World Press. pp. XII.
- Bhattacharya, Sabyasachi (2020). A Comprehensive History of Modern Bengal, 1700-1950. Asiatic Society. ISBN 978-93-89901-95-5.
- Sanjay Subrahmanyam (2012) [1993]. The Portuguese Empire in Asia, 1500-1700: A Political and Economic History (2nd ed.). Wiley. ISBN 9780470672914. OCLC 1055573094.
- Sarkar, Jadunath (1920), History of Aurangzib: Based on Original Sources, Longmans, Green and Company
- Sarkar, Jadunath (1919). History Of Aurangjib. pp. 264–265.
- Sarkar, Jadunath (1948). The History of Bengal. Vol. II (First ed.). Dacca: The University of Dacca.
- Sarkar, Jadunath (1960). Military History of India. Orient Longmans. pp. 66–69. ISBN 978-0-86125-155-1.
- Jadunath Sarkar (1985). Bengal Nawābs. Asiatic Soc. p. 8, .... Nawwara ( Bengal war flotilla ) and.
- Stephen P. Blake (2002). Shahjahanabad The Sovereign City in Mughal India 1639-1739 (Paperback). Cambridge University Press. ISBN 978-0-521-52299-1.
- Stone, George Cameron (2013). A Glossary of the Construction, Decoration and Use of Arms and Armor: in All Countries and in All Times. Dover: Courier Corporation. ISBN 9780486131290.
- Smith, Vincent A. (2002) [First published 1919]. The Oxford History of India. Oxford University Press. ISBN 978-0-19-561297-4.
- Tripathi, Ram Prasad (1960). Rise and Fall of the Mughal Empire. Allahabad: Central Book Depot.

=== Journal, thesis, and encyclopedia ===
- Ali, Syed Murtaza (1954). "A chronology of Muslim Faujdars of Sylhet". Proceedings of the Pakistan History Conference. Karachi: Pakistan Historical Society.
- Andrew De La Garza (2006). An unfinished revolution: Babur, Akbar and the rise of Mughal military power (MA thesis). Ohio State University.
- Iqtada Alam Khan (2001). "State in the Mughal India: Re-Examining the Myths of a Counter-Vision". Social Scientist. 29 (1): 35. doi:10.2307/3518271. JSTOR 3518271.
- Manjeet S. Pardesi (2017). "Region, System, and Order: The Mughal Empire in Islamicate Asia". Security Studies. 26 (2). Routledge, part of the Taylor & Francis Group. "This Mughal military machine conquered and absorbed all the northern and central regions of South Asia except for some small, geographically isolated, strategically insignificant, or …"
- Malik, Adnan; Zubair, Muhammad; Parveen, Uzman (2016). "Effects of social reforms of shaykh Ahmad sirhindi (1564-1624) on muslim society in the sub continent". Journal of Social Sciences and Humanities. 55 (2). University of Karachi: 155–164. doi:10.46568/jssh.v55i2.70.
- Khan, Muazzam Hussain (2012). "Musa Khan". In Sirajul Islam; Miah, Sajahan; Khanam, Mahfuza; Ahmed, Sabbir (eds.). Banglapedia: the National Encyclopedia of Bangladesh (Online ed.). Dhaka, Bangladesh: Banglapedia Trust, Asiatic Society of Bangladesh. ISBN 984-32-0576-6. OCLC 52727562. OL 30677644M.
- Rosalind O'Hanlon (2007). "Military Sports and the History of the Martial Body in India". Journal of the Economic and Social History of the Orient. 50 (4). Brill: 495. ISSN 0022-4995. JSTOR 25165208.
- Stephen P. Blake (1986). "Courtly Culture Under Babur and the Early Mughals". Journal of Asian History. 20 (2): 193–214. JSTOR 41931994.
