= Mongolicae Legationis Commentarius =

The Mongolicae Legationis Commentarius (Ambassador to the court of the Great Mogul) is a travel book written by the Catalan Jesuit Antoni de Montserrat between 1589 and 1600, which describes the vicissitudes experienced during the travels that the author carried out when he was sent as ambassador to the court of the great Mughal. In his account, Montserrat records the experiences, the peoples, the cultures and the geography that he was able to observe on his journey from the capital of the Mughal Empire, Fatehpur Sikri, to Afghanistan, passing through the current Indian states from Kashmir, Himachal Pradesh, Jammu, the Punjab region, Pakistan or the Himalayan ranges and the Hindu Kush.

The book is of great interest because it gives news for the first time of regions, ethnicities, religions, cultures and traditions unknown until then in the West, such as those of the Himalayas, which precisely motivated the Portuguese expedition of António de Andrade in Tibet - the first European - in 1624.

The Mongolicae Legationis Commentarius is complemented by a miniature map widely recognized for its great value and accuracy, which gave it validity until the segle xix and considered the author of the first roof map of the world. Although it is generally known as the "Map of the Himalayas", the truth is that Montserrat gives much more extensive descriptions that include India, Pakistan, Afghanistan and Tibet.

In 1582, Montserrat returned to Goa, where he began to write the chronicle in Latin, which he finished after he was released from his captivity, finishing it shortly before his death. It is not clear whether Montserrat wrote the book in Latin or in Portuguese - like Relaçam de Equebar, rei dos mogoras - although only a Latin version has survived.

== Bibliography ==
- MONTSERRAT de, Antoni; ALAY, Josep Lluís (edició i traducció): Ambaixador a la cort del Gran Mogol. Viatges d'un jesuïta català del segle XVI a l'Índia, Pakistan, Afganistan i Himàlaia, Lleida, 2002.
- Martí Escayol, Maria Antònia. “Antoni de Montserrat in the Mughal Garden of good government European construction of Indian nature”, Word, Image, Text; Studies in Literary and Visual Culture, ed. Shormistha Panja et al., Orient Blackswan, New Delhi, 2009. ISBN 978-81-250-3735-4
