= Antoni de Montserrat =

Spanish presbyter and cartographer

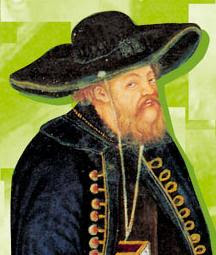

Antoni de Montserrat (Vic, Spain, 1536 – Salsette, Portuguese Goa, 1600) was a Catalan Jesuit trained in Portugal who in 1574 was assigned to the mission of the Portuguese colony of Goa, in Portuguese India, from where he would travel for the most part of Central Asia and the Arabian Peninsula. This traveler and scholar recorded his travels in four manuscripts, of which only two are preserved, the Mongolicae Legationis Commentarius, in Latin, and Relaçam do Equebar, rei dos mogoras, in Portuguese, referring to his stay in the court of the great mogul Akbar.

Son of a noble family from Osona, he studied in Barcelona, where he came into contact with Saint Ignatius of Loyola. Fascinated by the life of missionaries, he entered the Society of Jesus in 1558, being sent to Portugal, where he was ordained a priest in 1561. He studied at the University of Coimbra and, in Lisbon, where he was prefect of Sant Roc, founder of the convent of the orphans of Santa Marta, vice-rector of the college of Sant Antoni and preceptor of King Sebastian I of Portugal.

== Embassy to the court of the great Mughal Akbar ==
In 1574, at the age of 38, he saw his dream of becoming a missionary fulfilled when he was sent, with 40 other Jesuits, to the mission of the Portuguese colony of Goa, in India. Five years later, he was entrusted with the mission of joining the embassy that had to appear at the court of the Mughal emperor, Akbar, with the specific task of recording everything that happened during the trip. The presence of the priests had been expressly requested by the king himself, a fact that the Portuguese Jesuits misinterpreted as his desire to embrace the Christian faith, something which was in no case contemplated by the monarch. In this way, on 13 December 1579, Antoni de Montserrat, together with fellow Jesuits Rodolfo Acquaviva and Francisco Henriques– a Persian convert who acted as an interpreter – as well as an ambassador from Akbar, departed from the Portuguese colony of Daman for the capital of the Mughal Empire.

The arrival of the group in Fatehpur Sikri, the new capital founded by Akbar, took place on 4 March 1580, and there they remained for a year engaged in religious dialogues and debates, encouraged by the king himself, with representatives of other religions such as Tibetan Tantric Buddhism, Islam and Hinduism. Montserrat took advantage of his stay to instruct himself in the Persian language and ended up gaining Akbar's trust, as evidenced by the fact that he appointed him tutor to his son Murad.

After a year, a revolt broke out in the north led by a half-brother of the king, who had the support of some Afghan chieftains. At Akbar's request, Montserrat joined the military expedition and accompanied him throughout the campaign, which lasted throughout 1581. This trip allowed the Jesuit to make contact with a large part of the territories of the Empire, being able to visit Delhi, the Himalayas, Himachal Pradesh, Kashmir, Punjab and the foothills of Tibet to Afghanistan. The end of the conflict coincided with the return of the embassy to Goa, once the Jesuits ascertained the monarch's unwillingness to convert to Christianity. In this way, in September 1582, they arrived in the Portuguese colony where, for six years, Montserrat worked on his notes with the intention of achieving a more complex and detailed work. The Mongolicae Legationis Commentarius incorporated a map of the Himalayas considered a jewel of universal cartography, which describes much of today's India, Pakistan, Afghanistan and Tibet, for which Montserrat has been considered the author of the first map of the ceiling of the world.

== Captivity in Yemen ==
In 1588, Antoni de Montserrat received a direct order from the king of Spain, Felipe II, to go to Ethiopia in order to support the missionaries displaced there and explore the possibility of bringing Ethiopian Christianity closer to the Church of Rome. On 2 February 1589, Montserrat and his companion Pedro Páez set sail from Goa disguised as Armenian merchants. The trip was cut short when in Dhufar (Yemen) they were betrayed by a commander who was supposed to take them to Ethiopia but instead handed them over to the head of the city, who, in turn, sent them to Haymin, a city in the interior where there was the residence of the sultan of Hadhramaut. After four months locked up in the city prison, they were sent to Sana'a, seat of the Turkish governor of Yemen, where they remained until 1595, when they were transferred to the port of Mokha, on the Red Sea, where they had of serving in the galleys for a few months until Montserrat fell seriously ill and was put in the city prison.

Finally, a year later, these two Jesuits were returned to Goa, after the payment of a ransom of 1,000 ducats. The health of both was very precarious after almost seven years of captivity and, although Páez was able to recover, Antoni de Montserrat died in Salsette, near Goa, where there was a famous Jesuit convent, in March 1600.

== Modern rediscovery and legacy ==
Modern science discovered Antoni de Montserrat at the beginning of the 20th century. In 1906, Henry Hosten, a Jesuit of the British Raj specializing in the history of Christianity in India, rediscovered the Mongolicæ Legationis Commentarius and published it in 1914, piquing the interest of the Indologists of the time.

After being remembered for a time in the annotations of the work on the reign of Akbar and contemporaneous art, Antoni de Montserrat gained fame in the 20th century thanks to the popular edition of his works translated from Latin into Catalan and Spanish by the Orientalist from Barcelona Josep Lluís Alay. The growing fame of the Catalan traveler has led to a series of television programs and publications on religion in Catalonia, in addition to a scholarship in the science and culture of Asia that perpetuates his name.

== Complementary bibliography ==
- Montserrat, Antoni de (2002). Ambaixador a la cort del Gran Mogol: viatges d'un jesuïta català del segle XVI a l'Índia, Pakistan, Afganistan i Himàlaia. Pagès editors. ISBN 978-84-7935-916-4.
- Monserrate, Antonio (1922). The commentary of Father Monserrate, S.J., on his journey to the court of Akbar. London; Bombay [etc: H. Milford, Oxford University Press. ISBN 978-81-206-0807-8. OCLC 2872814.
- Mughal India according to European travel accounts: texts and studies 1. Frankfurt am Main: Institute for the History of Arabic-Islamic Science at the Johann Wolfgang Goethe Univ. 1997. ISBN 3-8298-2048-8. OCLC 833411663.
- Hosten, H. (1997). "Father A. Monserrate's Account of Akbar (26th Nov. 1582)". Mughal India According to European Travel Accounts: Texts and Studies 1. Frankfurt am Main: Institute for the History of Arabic-Islamic Science at the Johann Wolfgang Goethe Univ. ISBN 3-8298-2048-8. OCLC 833411663.
- Hosten, H. (1997). "Father A. Monserrate, S.J. on Salsete, Chorão, Divar and the Molucas (1579)". Mughal India According to European Travel Accounts: Texts and Studies 1. Frankfurt am Main: Institute for the History of Arabic-Islamic Science at the Johann Wolfgang Goethe Univ. ISBN 3-8298-2048-8. OCLC 833411663.
- Hosten, H. (1997). "The Jesuits at Agra in 1635-1637". Mughal India According to European Travel Accounts: Texts and Studies 1. Frankfurt am Main: Institute for the History of Arabic-Islamic Science at the Johann Wolfgang Goethe Univ. ISBN 3-8298-2048-8. OCLC 833411663.
- Beveridge, H. (1997). "Notes on Father Monserrate's Mongolicae Legationis Commentarius. (1915/16)". Mughal India According to European Travel Accounts: Texts and Studies 1. Frankfurt am Main: Institute for the History of Arabic-Islamic Science at the Johann Wolfgang Goethe Univ. ISBN 3-8298-2048-8. OCLC 833411663.
- Martí Escayol, Maria Antònia (2009). "Antoni de Montserrat in the Mughal Garden of good government European construction of Indian nature". Word, Image, Text: Studies in Literary and Visual Culture. New Delhi: Orient BlackSwan. ISBN 978-81-250-3735-4. OCLC 456520903.
- Martini, Youri (2018). Akbar e i gesuiti: missionari cristiani alla corte del Gran Moghul. Trapani. ISBN 978-88-6124-691-1. OCLC 1033547110.
