= Josep Lluís Alay =

Catalan historian and professor (born 1966)

Josep Lluís Alay i Rodríguez
- Born: José Luis Alay Rodríguez; 1966 (age 58–59); Barcelona, Spain
- Occupation(s): University professor, Head of Office for ex-Catalan President Carles Puigdemont.
- Known for: Tibetan culture researcher Catalan Independence Activist

Josep Lluís Alay i Rodríguez (Note: Catalan pronunciation: [ʒuˈzɛp ʎuˈiz əˈlaj i ruˈðɾiɣəs].) (Note: Catalan first names were illegal during the Francoist dictatorship, and so the Spanish State only recognized the castilianized name José Luis Alay Rodríguez during this period.) (born 1966) is a professor of Asian history at the University of Barcelona and chief of staff of Carles Puigdemont. He is the director of the Tibet and Central Asia Observatory and lecturer in Contemporary History of Tibet and Mongolia. He was the first Catalan writer to have translated a text written in Tibetan language and was responsible for the publication of Les poesies d’amor del sisè dalai-lama del Tibet (The Love Poems of the Sixth Dalai Lama of Tibet), of which he was the translator as well as author of the Prologue and Notes. In 2002 he recovered the written work of the Jesuit missionary Antoni de Montserrat and reconstructed his three-year journey through territories now comprised by India, Pakistan and Afghanistan. Since 2004 he has headed around ten projects of cooperation in Tibet, working in the spheres of education and health. He has vastly published on the Tibet question and his last works on this issue are Arrels del Tibet (Pagès, 2009) and Tibet, el país de la neu en flames (Publicacions UB, 2010).

In 2010, he received his Ph.D. in Contemporary History from the University of Barcelona with the thesis on lama tibetano Khyung Sprul Rhine Po Che: Khyung Sprul Rhine Po Che, a Tibetan mendicant: his life and trips to Kinnaur and Western Tibet. His latest research work focuses on the communication routes between Tibet and the Tibet, Western India during the first half of the 20th century. Collaborate as a contributor to Ara newspaper. From July 2011 until June 2015 he was the Director of Heritage, Museums and Archives of the Barcelona City Council. Since 2015, he is the Commissioner for International Relations of the Diputació de Barcelona.

On 25 March 2018, Alay accompanied Carles Puigdemont on a car trip from Finland to Brussels. When crossing the border with Germany, Puigdemont was arrested by the German police in Neumünster. Three days later, on March 28, Alay was detained by the Spanish police in the middle of an ongoing investigation. In June 2018 he became Coordinator of International Presidency Policies on Quim Torra's government. In October 2018, Spanish judge Diego de Egea archived the cause. In January 2019 another judge asked to reopen the case.

On 3 September 2021, The New York Times published an article claiming that Alay "met with current Russian officials, former intelligence officers and the well-connected grandson of a K.G.B. spymaster. The aim was to secure Russia’s help in severing Catalonia from the rest of Spain." On 10 November 2021, Alay was charged with alleged "misuse of public funds and embezzlement over a trip in November 2018 to attend a referendum in New Caledonia on full independence from France. According to the Barcelona High Court and the prosecution, Alay was invited to the archipelago in the southwest Pacific in a personal capacity for the referendum, and it was not appropriate for the Catalan government to bear the cost." In July 2022, the judge scaled-back the inquiry and closed the file.
