= Francisco Bethencourt =

Portuguese history academic

Francisco Bethencourt (born 1955 in Lisbon) is a Portuguese historian and academic. He is currently the Charles Boxer professor at King's College London.

== Education ==
Bethencourt graduated from the Lisbon University, obtained a Master of Arts from the New University of Lisbon. He completed his PhD in the European University Institute, Florence, Italy.

== Career ==
He taught at Universidade Nova de Lisboa and Brown University. Bethencourt’s research centres on the history of racism, Portuguese and European expansion from the 15th to the 19th centuries, missions and religious history in the Catholic world, and identities and cultural exchange in Iberia. Bethencourt's Racisms: From the Crusades to the Twentieth Century (2013) was described as the first worldwide history of racism. It was described by Ekow Eshun in The Independent as "an unlovely history. But a necessary one".

== Selected publications ==
- Racisms: From the Crusades to the Twentieth Century. Princeton: Princeton University Press, 2013.
- The Inquisition. A Global History, 1478-1834. Cambridge: Cambridge University Press, 2009.
- Racism and Ethnic Relations in the Portuguese-Speaking World. London/Oxford: British Academy/Oxford University Press, 2012. (edited with Adrian Pearce)
- The Portuguese Oceanic Expansion, 1400-1800. Cambridge: Cambridge University Press, 2007. (edited with Diogo Ramada Curto)
- História da expansão portuguesa, 5 volumes, Lisboa: Temas e Debates e Autores, 1998-2000 (edited with Kirti Narayan Chaudhuri)
- Strangers Within: The Rise and Fall of the New Christian Trading Elite , Princeton: Princeton University Press, 2024; ISBN 9780691209913. Reviewed in the London Review of Books.

== Awards ==
In 2003, Bethencourt was honoured for his achievements as historian with the Portuguese Order of Prince Henry.
