= Michael Pearson (historian) =

New Zealand historian and academic

Michael N. Pearson
- Born: Michael Naylor Pearson; 1941; Morrinsville, New Zealand
- Died: 3 July 2023
- Occupation(s): Historian; Academic

Michael Naylor Pearson (1941 - 3 July 2023) was a historian and academic known for his studies on the Indian Ocean. He was a professor at University of New South Wales, Sydney.

Pearson was born in Morrinsville, New Zealand. He studied at University of Auckland and completed his doctoral studies from University of Michigan (1971).

Pearson died 3 July 2023 in Australia.

== Books ==
- The Indian Ocean (2003)
- India and the Indian Ocean (1999)
- The Swahili Coast, India and Portugal in the Early Modern Era (1998)
- Pious Passengers: the Hajj in Earlier Times (1994).
- The Portuguese in India (The New Cambridge History of India I.1). Cambridge: Cambridge University Press (1987)
- Merchants and Rulers in Gujarat. The Response to the Portuguese in the Sixteenth Century. Berkeley: University of California Press (1976)
