= Polly O'Hanlon =

Rosalind (Polly) O’Hanlon FBA is an early modern historian and specialist in the colonial history of India. She is a retired Professor in Indian History and Culture at the Faculty of Asian and Middle Eastern Studies, University of Oxford. O'Hanlon is an Emeritus Fellow of Clare College. She was elected as a Fellow of the British Academy in 2020.

O'Hanlon completed her PhD thesis at SOAS on the history of caste protest in western India. This involved archival work in Maharashtra. A revised version of the thesis was published in 1985 by Cambridge University Press.

== Select publications ==
- Caste, Conflict and Ideology. Mahatma Jotirao Phule and Low Caste Protest in Nineteenth-Century Western India. Cambridge: Cambridge University Press, 1985.
- "Recovering the Subject Subaltern Studies and Histories of Resistance in Colonial South Asia-Subaltern Studies", Modern Asian Studies, 22 (1), 189-224, 1988.
- "Letters Home: Banaras pandits and the Maratha Regions in early modern India", Modern Asian Studies, 44 (2), 201-240, 2010.
- "Performance in a World of Paper: Puranic Histories and Social communication in Early Modern India", Past and Present, 219, 87-126, 2013.
- At the Edges of Empire: Essays in the Social and Intellectual History of India. New Delhi: Permanent Black, 2014.
- "'Pre-Modern'" Pasts: South Asia". In Prasenjit Duara, Viren Murthy and Andrew Sartori (eds.), A Companion to Global Historical Thought. Hoboken: John Wiley and Sons. 108-121, 2014.
- Scholar-Intellectuals in Early Modern India: Discipline, Sect, Lineage and Community. Routledge: London and New York, 2015. Edited with C. Minkowski and A. Venkatkishnan.
- Lineages of Brahman Power: Caste, Family, and the State in Western India, 1600–1900, Albany, NY: SUNY Press, 2025.
