= Portuguese conquest of Daman =

Historical conflict in India

- Part of Gujarati–Portuguese conflicts
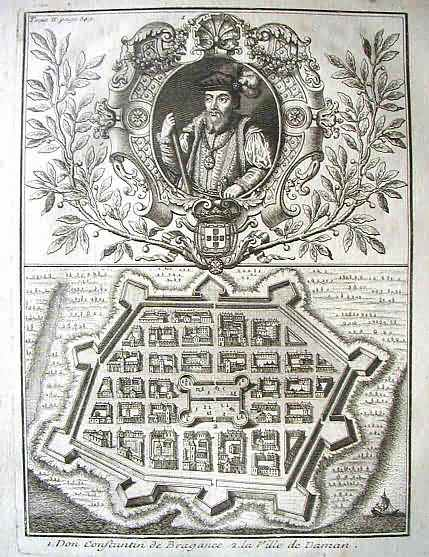
- Copperplate engraving depicting Dom Constantino de Bragança and Daman.
Date	2 February 1559
Location	Daman, India.
Result	Portuguese victory

Belligerents
(Kingdom of Portugal) Portuguese Empire	Sultanate of Gujarat

Commanders and leaders
(Kingdom of Portugal) Dom Constantino de Bragança: António Moniz Barreto; Dom Pedro de Almeida	Siddi Bofeta

Strength
3,000 men 100 ships.	4,000 men

Casualties and losses
Few.	500 men

The Portuguese conquest of Daman was a military campaign undertaken by the Portuguese Empire against the city of Daman, in India, until then owned by the Sultanate of Gujarat. The Portuguese captured the city.

== Context ==
Upon assuming office as viceroy of India, Dom Constantino de Bragança sought to reinforce the security of Portuguese Bassein by establishing a new stronghold at nearby Daman, which the Portuguese governor of India Francisco Barreto had previously obtained from the Sultan of Gujarat Ahmad Shah III as a concession but was unable to take possession of it due to the resistance of the lord of the territory, whom the Portuguese identified as Cide Bofata, who rebelled against the decision of the sultan and gathered 4000 men to defend it. The viceroy therefore sailed with a force of 100 ships to take Daman by force.

== The campaign ==
Upon landing at Daman, the Siddi Bofeta had the resident Christians beheaded for suspecting collusion with the Portuguese, and then promptly abandoned the city to retreat inland, allowing the Portuguese to capture the settlement unopposed. The first Portuguese to enter the city and fly a regimental flag was Manuel Rolim, upon which the Portuguese armada fired a gun salute. The Gujarati camped at Pernel, where they prepared a force of 2000 horsemen to resist the Portuguese. António Moniz Barreto marched out during the night with 500 men, and successfully conducted a night-time attack against the camp, driving the enemy from it with a loss of 500 men. 36 large cannon were captured, along with money and other spoils.

By liberality and other means, Dom Constantino compelled the native inhabitants who had fled to return to their homes. The viceroy also confirmed the rights over the customs of Daman to the neighbouring King of Sarceta, a nearby mountain ruler.

Dom Constantino then endeavoured to capture Valsad (Bulsar in Portuguese), towards which objective he dispatched Dom Pedro de Almeida with 150 horsemen and 150 infantrymen. The local inhabitants fled at the approach of the Portuguese, and a garrison of 120 men was left in the place.

== Aftermath ==
The Gujarati fort was captured by the Portuguese and christened as Nossa Senhora da Purificação after the day it was captured.

Having secured the region, Dom Constantino established a garrison of 1200 men at Daman, upon which he returned to Goa, capital of Portuguese possessions in Asia. After the acquisition of Bassein in 1534 and Diu in 1535, Portuguese grip on navigation in the Gulf of Khambat became even tighter, making it increasingly difficult for Indian ships to travel without acquiring a cartaz, and the invicibility of Portuguese fleets terrified the Gujaratis into accepting the system. Control of the Gulf was therefore complete.

Daman would remain in the possession of Portugal for 402 years, until 1961.

== See also ==
- Portuguese India
- Fort of Daman
- Fort São Jerónimo
- Mughal–Portuguese conflicts
  - Siege of Daman (1581)
  - Mughal–Portuguese War (1692–1693)
- Daman and Diu Portuguese Creole
