= Fort São Jerónimo =

Fortress in Daman

Fort of St. Jerome
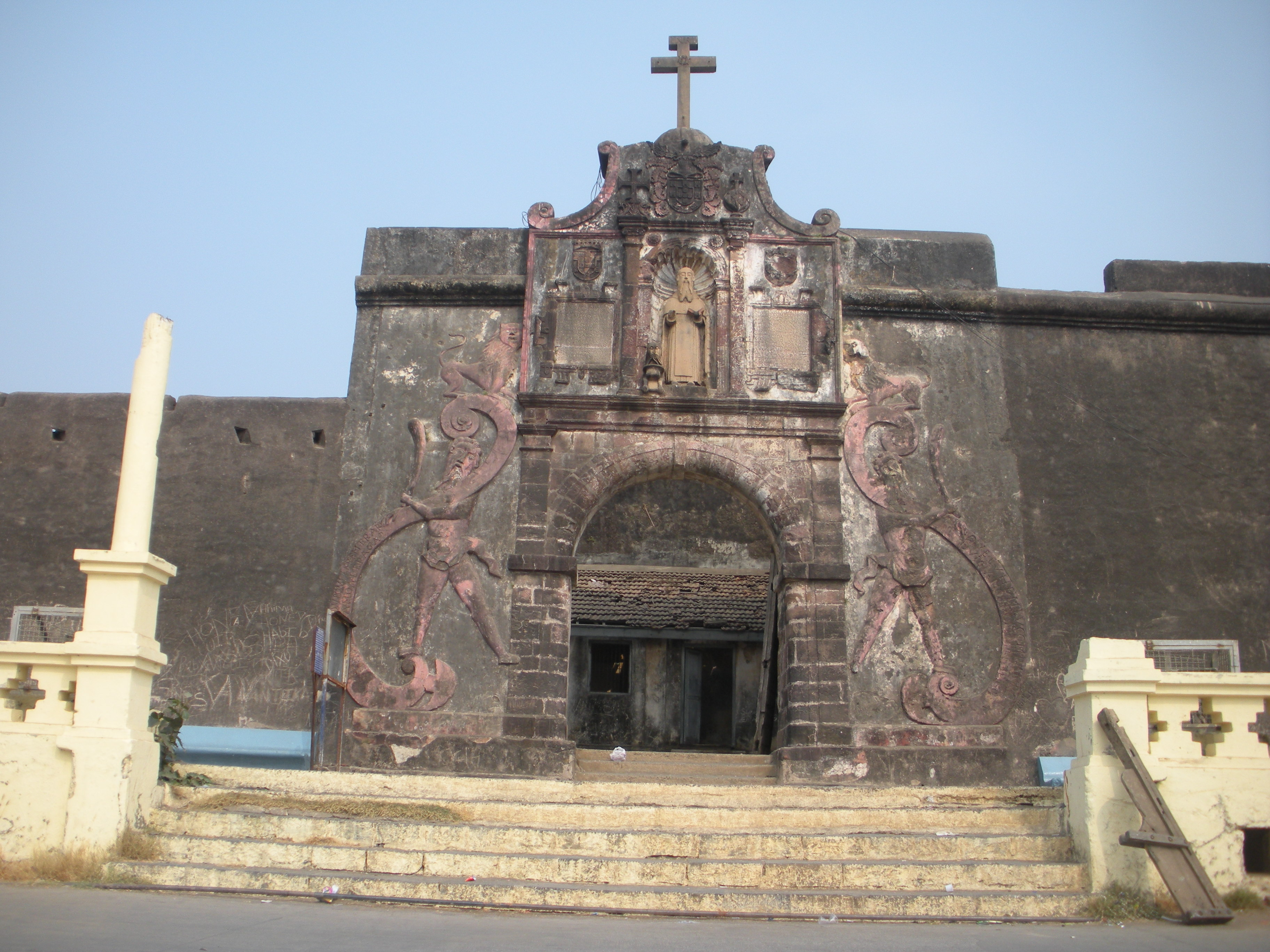
- Fort of St. Jerome

Site information
- Type: Coastal Fort
- Open to the public: Yes
- Condition: mostly intact

Location
- Location of Fort of St. Jerome Fort of St. Jerome (India)
- Coordinates: 20°24′47″N 72°49′56″E
- Height: 40m

Site history
- Built: 1614 AD (groundbreaking); 1672 AD (completed)
- Built by: Dom Jeronimo de Azevado
- In use: Civilian use
- Materials: Laterite stone and mud
- Battles/wars: Siege of Daman (1638–1639)

Garrison information
- Current commander: none
- Past commanders: Dom Franciso de Gama

Fort São Jerónimo is a former Portuguese fortress located on the right bank of the Damanganga River, on the coast of the Gulf of Khambat, former parish of Damão Pequeno, in the city of Daman, India. Inside is the co-cathedral of the Sanctuary of Our Lady of the Seas (Nossa Senhora dos Mares in Portuguese).

== History ==
The incentive to build a stronghold or bulwark in Damão Pequeno may be related to the invasion of the Mughal army in 1611, in retaliation for the imprisonment in Surat of a merchant ship coming from Jeddah. Although Daman held out, the surrounding territory was pillaged. The population of Damão Pequeno had grown in importance and was beginning to concentrate much of the trade and population of the mouth of the Damanganga. Thus, this fort complemented the defense of the region together with the Fortress of Daman, located on the opposite bank of the Damanganda.

Started in 1615, during the viceroyalty of Dom Jerónimo de Azevedo, the work was carried out by Júlio Simão, then chief engineer of the Portuguese State of India, although it may have been the responsibility of the rector of the Jesuit college of Damão, António Albertino, as the Jesuits were the administrators of the fortification works in Daman. Most of the work was completed by 1627. In 1698 the fort had a garrison of 400 men at least. In 1808 fort São Jerónimo housed 631 residents. The fort was the place of the last public execution in the Portuguese empire shortly before the capital punishment was abolished in Portuguese territory, in 1870.

== Characteristics ==
The fort presents a design in accordance with the then most up-to-date treatises. It had a triangular plan with 132 meters long walls on the two smaller sides and 143 meters on the longer one. At its apexes rose a dominant bastion and two half-bastions. They were named São Jerónimo, Santo Inácio and São Francisco Xavier.

The structure was conceived as a kind of autonomous hornwork of the fortress of Daman, with the three bastions facing north, northeast and east, thus pointing towards the land and not towards the city, with flanks where the wall is weak and narrow. The three bastions, with a pronounced triangular outline, had elements that allowed them to function autonomously as bastions of resistance. It had a moat. Several barracks and ammunition houses were built inside the fort.

The main door of the fortification, facing south, in addition to containing extensive information about the foundation of the structure, features two decorative motifs flanking the opening, consisting of two giants, each holding a millstone and a parchment. The message inscribed on the parchments reads: “Whoever wants to enter here must pay with this millstone: my companion and I will guard it without money”. This message perhaps alludes to the supposed or desired incorruptibility of the fort's defenders. Over the arch there is a niche with the image of Saint Jerome, crowned by the Portuguese coat of arms and a cross. The statue of St. Jerome was "paid" the salary of an army captain, saved until the feast of St. Jerome when the garrison had a gala organized with the funds accumulated from the pay.

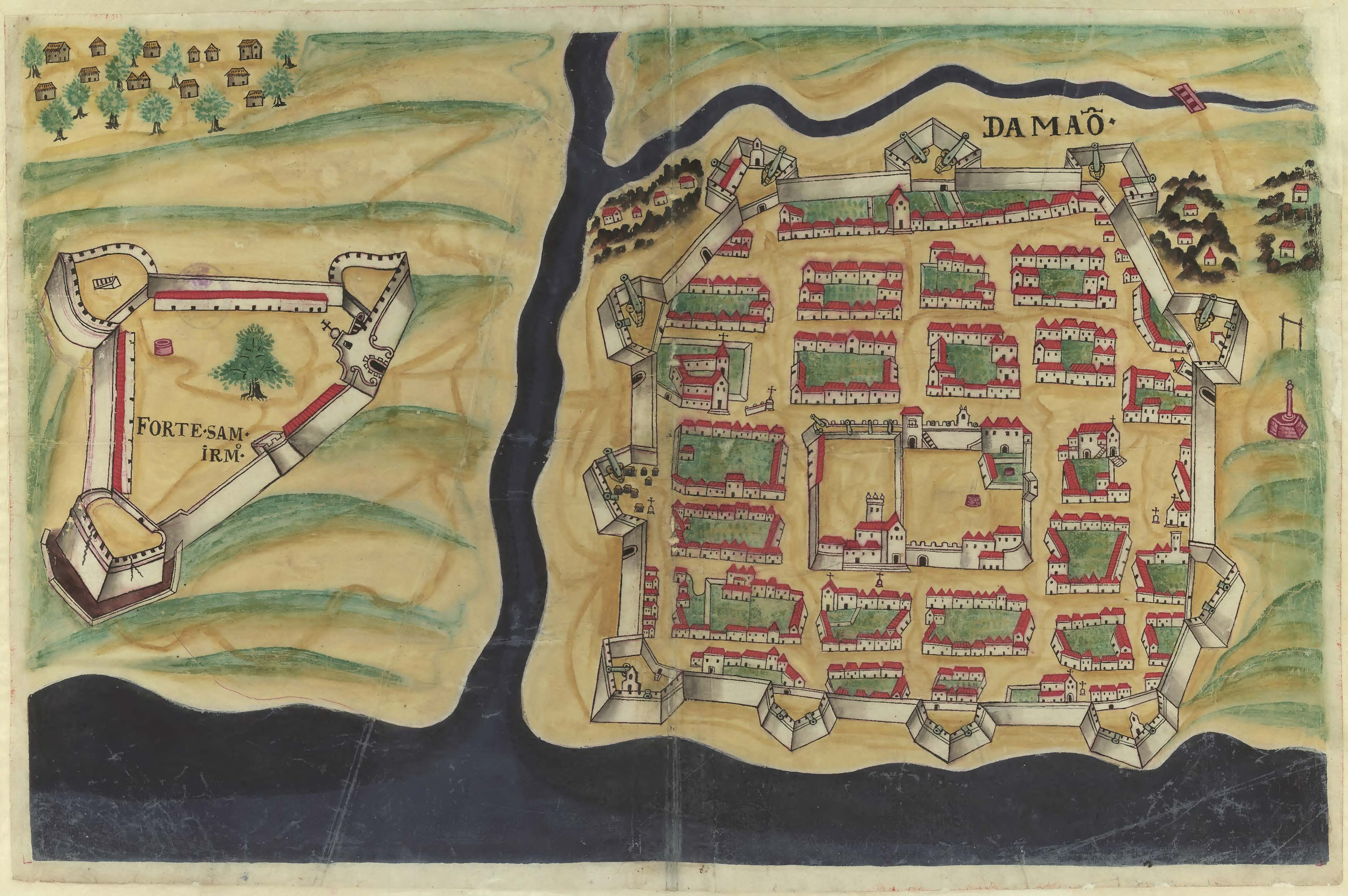
1635 illustration depicting the city of Daman and Fort São Jerónimo.

The wooden gates are studded with iron spikes to prevent elephants from breaking them open.

== See also ==
- Siege of Daman (1638–1639)
- Mughal–Portuguese War (1692–1693)
