= Siege of Daman =

The Siege of Daman may refer to one of the following conflicts fought in or around the town of Daman:

- Siege of Daman (1581)
- Siege of Daman (1638–1639)
- Annexation of Goa (1961) which involved the Indian Invasion of Daman.
