= Mughal–Portuguese War (1692–1693) =

Historical conflict

- Part of Mughal–Portuguese conflicts
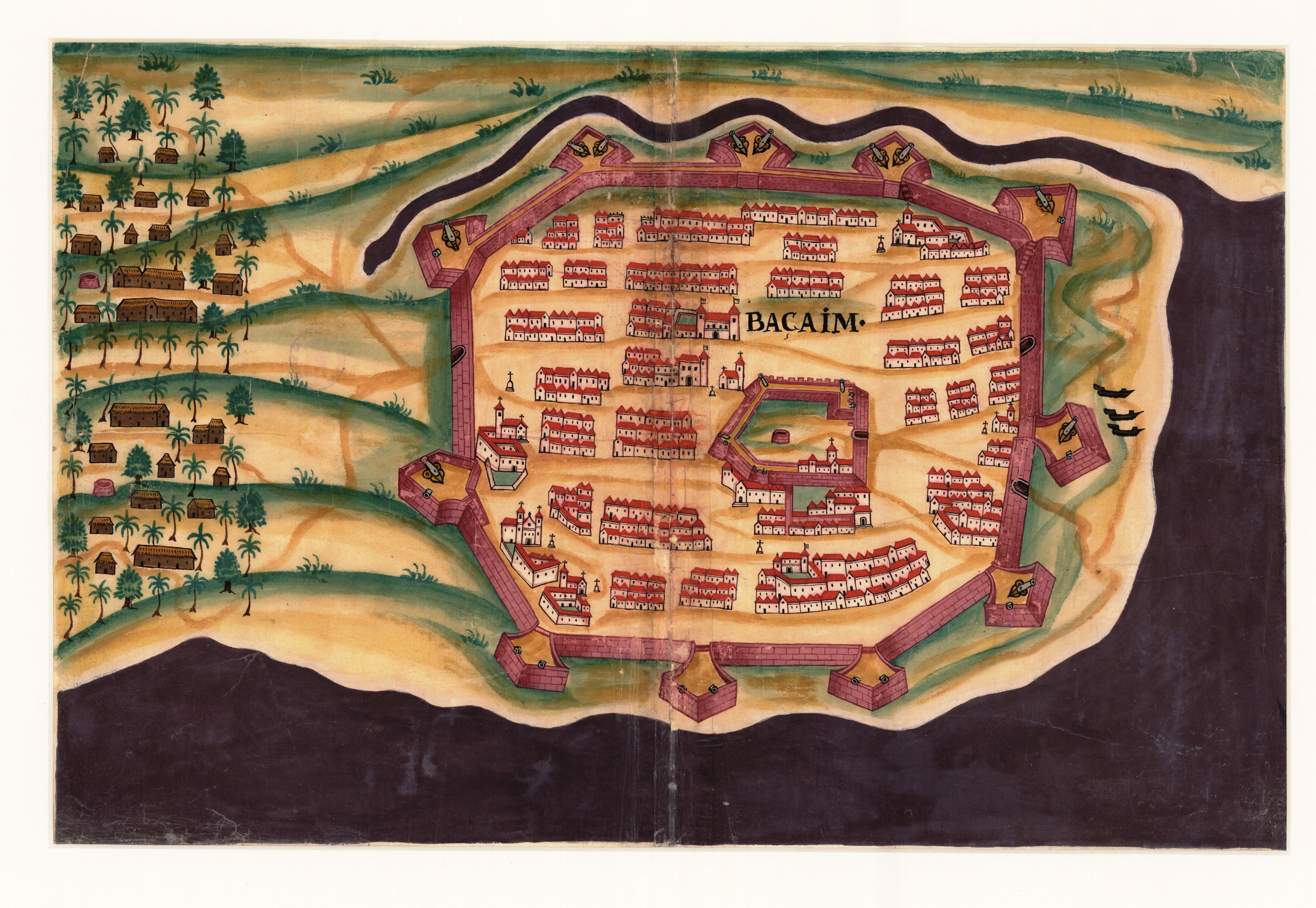
- Fortress of Bassein in 1635.
Date	1692–1693
Location	Vasai, Maharashtra, India
Result	Inconclusive
Territorial changes	Status quo ante bellum

Belligerents
Mughal Empire	Portuguese Empire

Commanders and leaders
Matabar Khan	Viceroy Pedro de Meneses Noronha de Albuquerque

Strength
Unknown	Unknown

Casualties and losses
Unknown	Unknown

The Mughal–Portuguese War of 1692–1693 was a brief conflict between the Mughal Empire and Portuguese India, launched by the Mughal general Matabar Khan against the Portuguese in Vasai (Bassein), near present-day Mumbai (Bombay).

== Background ==
In 1693, during the Mughal–Maratha Wars the region of Konkan served as a base of Maratha activities since it was suitable for launching raids against the Mughals in Deccan. One of these refuges for Marathas was the fort of Sidhgarh (29 miles southeast of Mahuli), the Mughal general Matabar khan after waiting for six months, they captured the fort on 20 October, upon hearing this loss, the Maratha generals Khandoji Kadam and Damaji Naryan led a force from Rajmachi and blockaded Sidhgarh by occupying the village below the fort, Mughal reinforcement arrived and expelled the Marathas after a heavy fight.

The escaping Marathas found shelter in Portuguese territories after bribing the local Portuguese governor, the Portuguese started supplying them and giving shelter to Maratha families as well, the general of Salsette Island Tristao de Mello favored the Marathas

== Course of hostilities ==
The Portuguese denied the Mughals permission to cross their territory to attack the Marathas. Having learned of the Portuguese acts, Matabar khan launched an attack against them, a strong detachment invaded their holdings in Konkan, and he drove the native peasants into the Mughal side and captured many of the enemy families whenever found, the Portuguese attempted to offer a fight but were routed after a severe battle, he captured two forts according to Khafi Khan the Mughals then chased the retreating Portuguese in Bassein, they set the church outside of Bassein to fire and halted at Bahadurpura asking Aurangzeb to lend him more reinforcements to attack Bassein and other forts. The domestic enemies of the Portuguese took advantage of this and sided with the Mughals as the inhabitants of Uran did.

The viceroy of Goa sent a letter to Aurangzeb and presents to his minister and servants. It was not difficult for the viceroy to obtain the cessation of hostilities by a diplomatic manner, remembering to the Mughals the longstanding relations between them and military cooperation in a previous conflict. The viceroy denied any involvement with the Marathas, which the Mughals accepted.

Aurangzeb ordered the cessation of the war and the release of the Portuguese prisoners as a quarrel with Europeans would hinder the trade and diminish his revenues, Matabar attempted to reverse this by explaining his conduct but failed.

== See also ==
- Siege of Daman (1581)
- Siege of Hooghly
- Siege of Daman (1638–1639)
- Fort Vasai
- Portuguese India
