= Siege of Hooghly =

1632 military engagement in West Bengal, India

Siege of Hooghly (1632)
- Part of Mughal–Portuguese conflicts
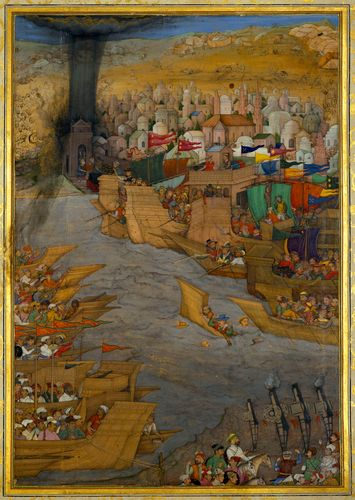
- Siege of Hoogly, Mughal depiction
Date	24 June – 24 September 1632
Location	Hugli-Chuchura, West Bengal
Result	Mughal victory

Belligerents
Mughal Empire	Portuguese Empire

Commanders and leaders
Qasim Khan Juvayni	Manuel de Azevedo

Strength
150,000 men 90 Elephants; 14,000 Cavalry	300 Portuguese; 700 Indian converts

Casualties and losses
1,000 killed	500–1,000 killed 400 captured
- Reportedly 10,000 Europeans and 1,000 Muslims dead 4,000 captured and only 3 out of 300 vessels escaped

The siege of Hooghly was a military engagement between the Mughal Army and the Portuguese garrison of Fort Hooghly, the result was the capture of the fort and expulsion of the Portuguese.

== Background ==
The Portuguese founded the town of Hooghly-Chuchura in 1579, but the district has thousands of years of heritage in the form of the Kingdom of Bhurshut. The city flourished as a trading port and some religious structures were built, including a Christian church dedicated to a statue of Mary, brought by the Portuguese.

In 1628, Shah Jahan became the emperor of the Mughal Empire. At the same time, news reached from Qasim Khan Juvayni, the Governor of Bengal, that the Portuguese were committing acts of piracy, smuggling, kidnapping, and the slave trade. Shah Jahan resolved to curb these Portuguese acts. It is reported by Om Prakash that the Portuguese had become brazen and confident as they believed that they were superior to the Mughals in open wide naval conflict in areas like the Ganges river while also being boosted by their Arakanese allies. As a result, the Portuguese raids grew more sever that caused the Nawabs of Bengal to grow worried.

== Siege ==
In 1632, Shah Jahan ordered Qasim Khan to attack the Portuguese and expel them totally. The Mughal Army consisted of 150,000 men, 90 war elephants, and 14,000 cavalry. In June, they arrived and besieged the fort, the Portuguese garrison consisted of only 300 Portuguese and 700 Indian converts, they also had 300 vessels, the fort was heavily fortified, they were led by Captain Manuel de Azevedo, the Portuguese held out for 3 months, the Portuguese tried to negotiate with the Emperor by offering him a huge sum of money and promised to pay tribute, but at the same time they were making a great effort to complete their war preparations to resist the Mughal Army, so they prepared a division of artillery to fight the enemy. until when Mughals dug a mine and blew a portion of the walls, the Mughals swiftly entered the fort and defeated the garrison, The Mughals only lost 1,000 men during the siege while the Portuguese lost 1,700 men, 4,000 were enslaved including women and children, all ships were captured except 3, only 3,000 escaped the sack and around 10,000 native Indians were liberated.

== See also ==
- Mughal–Portuguese War (1692–1693)
