= Siege of Daman (1638–1639) =

Portuguese victory over the Mughals in India

Siege of Daman 1638–1639
- Part of Mughal–Portuguese conflicts
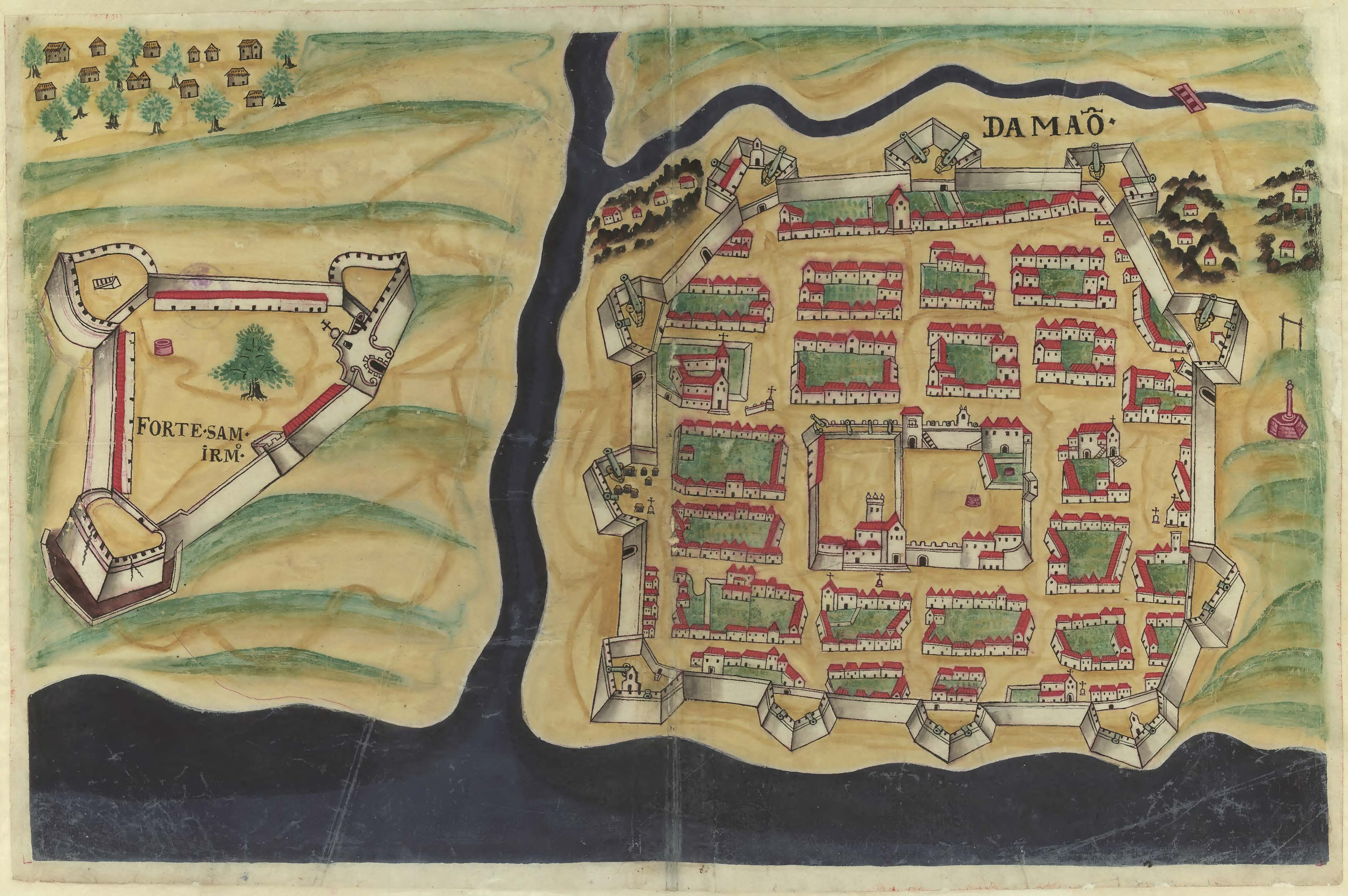
- 1635 Portuguese illustration of Daman
Date	1638–1639
Location	Daman, India
Result	Portuguese victory

Belligerents
(Portugal) Portuguese Empire	Mughal Empire

Commanders and leaders
(Portugal) Luís de Melo e Sampaio (DOW); (Portugal) António Teles de Meneses; (Portugal) Brás de Castro	Prince Muhi-al-Din

Strength
Unknown	10,000, 25,000 or 40,000 men

Casualties and losses
Unknown	700–7,000 killed

The siege of Daman of 1639, also called the great siege of Daman was a military engagement between Portuguese forces and those of the Mughal Empire in the city of Daman, in India. A Mughal army commanded by the Mughal prince Muhi-al-Din (Aurangzeb) attempted to assault Daman, but was repulsed in the face of stubborn Portuguese resistance.

== The siege ==
After invading the territory of Daman, the Mughals set up their camp in Magravará, and from there dug trenches and siege works to approach Daman. All male Portuguese residents able to bear arms were called up for service, and engaged with the Mughals outside the walls in an attempt to keep them at bay.

As reports reached Goa and neighbouring Portuguese garrisons of the siege, reinforcements were dispatched to Daman. The viceroy sent a detachment of troops under the command of the captain-major of the north Dom Brás de Castro, who upon arriving at Daman conducted a number of limited rallies against the Mughals outside the walls several times, though he was strictly forbidden on the viceroys orders.

The defenders of Daman were later joined by reinforcements under the command of general Luís de Melo e Sampaio, who ordered a general sally with all of his troops. The Portuguese managed to surprise the Mughals and capture the siege-works closest to the city, but were afterwards forced to withdraw back behind the city walls by the numerical superiority of the Mughals. General Sampaio and his son Diogo were both wounded in the action while covering the retreat of their men, and general Luís de Melo Sampaio died two days later at Daman. He was replaced by captain-major António Teles de Meneses.

On the evening of 5 January 1639, an English ship transporting William Methwold, who had recently resigned the position of president of the English commerce in India called at Daman, and despite the siege, the Portuguese captain of the city offered Methwold a barrel of wine and other refreshments. Because the Mughals were unable to cut the naval supply lines to Daman, the Portuguese were able to continuously reinforce the city from the sea.

Unable to break through Portuguese defenses despite mounting casualties, the Mughals requested peace through the governor of Surat Mir Musa, with the help of the president of the English East India Company factory at Surat, and later lifted the siege, having lost 700 to 7,000 men in the action.

== See also ==
- Portuguese India
- Siege of Daman (1581)
