= Mughal–Portuguese conflicts =

16th to 18th century conflicts in India

- Part of Portuguese presence in Asia
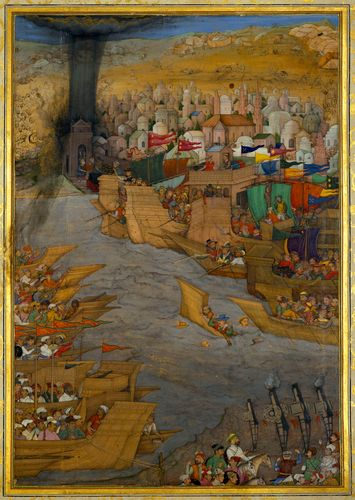
- Siege of Hooghly
Date	1535–1693 (158 years)
Location	Gujarat, Bengal, India
Result	Inconclusive: Mughals ensure territorial dominance; Portugal retains significant maritime influence; Mughals begin to favor trade with the English over the Portuguese

Belligerents
Portuguese Empire	Mughal Empire; Supported by: Janjira State

Commanders and leaders
(Portugal) Vasco Pires de Sampayo; (Portugal) João de Sousa; (Portugal) Nuno Velho Pereira; (Portugal) Ayres Telles de Menezes; (Portugal) Dom Pedro de Almeida; (Portugal) Martim Afonso de Melo; (Portugal) Jerónimo de Azevedo; (Portugal) Luiz de Brito; (Portugal) Luiz de Mello e Sampayo; (Portugal) António Telles de Menezes; (Portugal) Dom Braz de Castro; (Portugal) Pedro António de Meneses Noronha de Albuquerque	Qutub ud-Din Khan; Caliche Mahamed; Qasim Khan Juvayni; Prince Muhi-al-Din; Matabar Khan

Mughal–Portuguese conflicts refers to the various armed engagements between the forces of the Portuguese Empire in South Asia and the Mughal Empire, between the 16th century and the 18th century.

The Mughal Empire came into direct contact with the Portuguese Empire in 1573 after Akbar's conquest of Gujarat, which bordered the Portuguese territories of Dio, Daman & Bassein (Vasai) near Portuguese Bombay. The Portuguese governor António de Noronha then signed a treaty with Akbar, officially establishing bilateral relations between Portugal and the Mughal Empire.

Hostilities usually broke out because of diplomatic blunders, Portuguese support of the Maratha Empire or steadfast Portuguese rejection of Mughal demands for tribute.

Despite occasional incidents, Mughal-Portuguese relations were usually pragmatic in practice, as the Mughals prioritized land and Portuguese authorities the sea. Starting in 1573, the Mughals agreed not to harbor pirate fleets, welcomed Portuguese ambassadors and Jesuit missions in Agra and in return the Portuguese Crown granted a single naval license or cartaz each year to the Mughal emperors, who in effect tacitly acknowledged Portuguese naval supremacy.

Conflict with the Portuguese also caused the Mughal Empire to favour relations with the English East India Company, who were allowed to open a trading post at Surat, in the hopes that the English might be of assistance against the Portuguese.

== Early engagements 1535-1573 ==
Between the signing of the Treaty of Bassein in 1534 and the annexation of Gujarat in 1573, the Portuguese occasionally engaged invading Mughal troops in defense of their territory or in support of the Sultanate of Gujarat.

=== Siege of Verivene, 1535 ===
At the request of the Sultan of Gujarat, the Portuguese governor of India Nuno da Cunha dispatched Vasco Pires de Sampayo at the head of a naval squadron with 250 soldiers to recover the fort of Verivene by the mouth of the Indus River, which had been taken by the Mughals. An attack was made one morning, but before the Portuguese could land their artillery the Mughals abandoned the fort during the night and it was recovered for Gujarat the following day.

=== Siege of Daman, 1565 ===
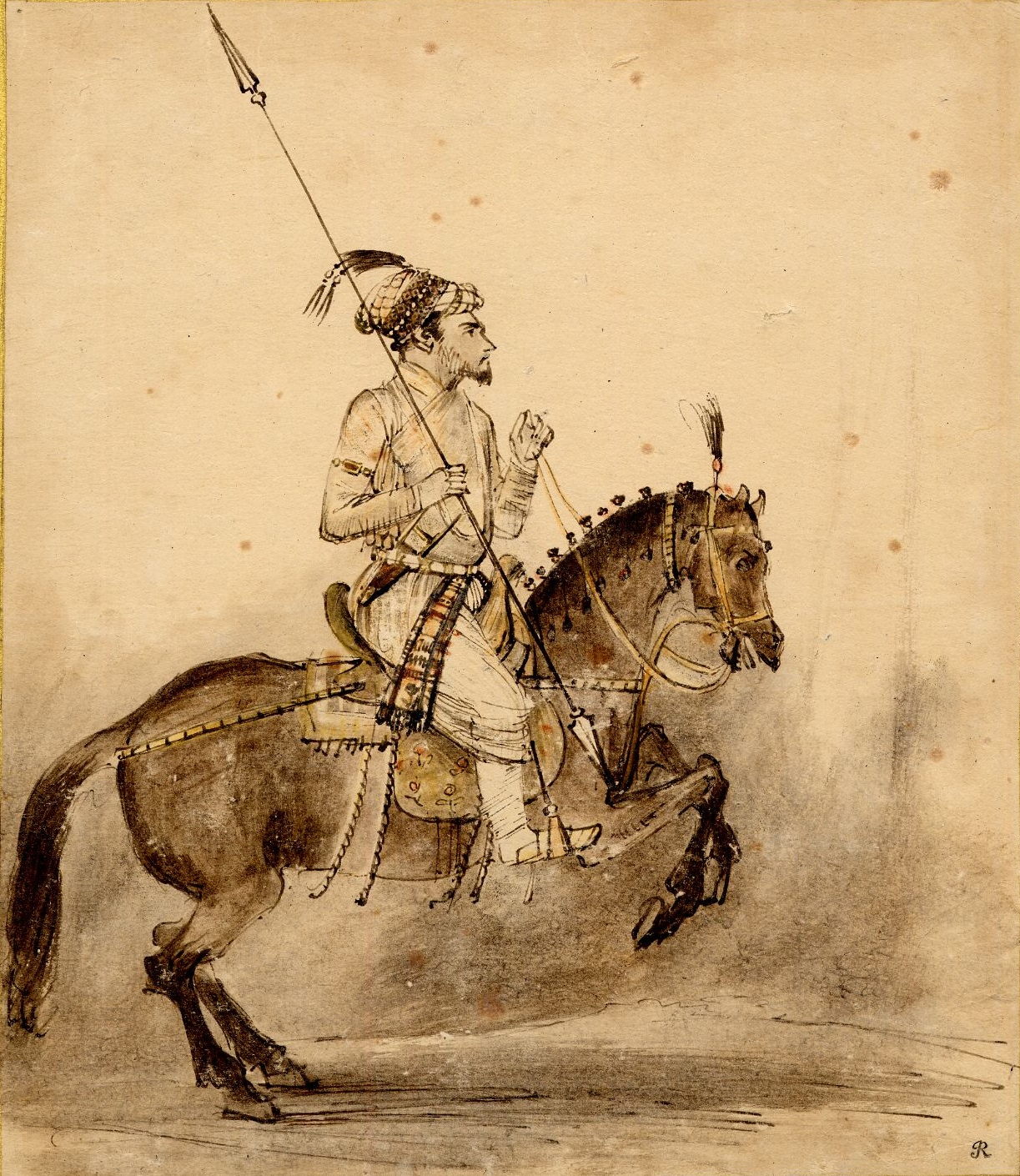
17th century sketch of a Mughal horseman.

When the Mughals invaded the Sultanate of Gujarat in 1565, 3000 Mughal horsemen invaded the Portuguese territory of Daman. After receiving reinforcements from Goa, Chaul and Bassein, the captain of Daman João de Sousa marched north beyond the Daman Ganga River with a force of 600 arquebusiers, 120 horse cavalry and some field guns to Pernel, where the Mughals had set up camp but the Mughals immediately withdrew, leaving behind all their material, which was captured.

=== Gujarat campaigns, 1569 ===
In 1569, Nuno Velho Pereira was dispatched from Daman with a naval squadron to clear the Gulf of Cambay of Portuguese enemies. He burnt two settlements, ships, captured prisoners and later attacked a Mughal stronghold three leagues away from Daman at Pernel, which was abandoned after six days of artillery bombardment and razed.

Ayres Telles de Menezes helped Rustum Khan resist a Mughal siege on Bharuch with a squadron of seven ships. Rustum Khan offered to become a tributary vassal of Portugal in exchange but after the Mughals were driven off Rustum Khan repudiated his part of the agreement.

Portuguese naval and war banner featuring the Cross of the Order of Christ.

While the siege of Bharuch was ongoing, the captain of Daman sailed to Surat and confiscated two large merchant ships loaded by the lord of Surat Agaluchem without the authorization of the Portuguese viceroy of India. They were valued at 100,000 ducats.

== Siege of Surat, 1572 ==
In 1572, the Mughal Empire annexed Gujarat and acquired its first access to the sea, but local officials informed Akbar that the Portuguese had begun to exert control in the Indian Ocean. Akbar obtained a cartaz (permit) from the Portuguese to sail in the Persian Gulf region. At the initial meeting of the Mughals and the Portuguese during the Siege of Surat, the Portuguese, recognising the superior strength of the Mughal army, chose to pursue diplomacy to resolve their conflict. The Portuguese Governor, upon the request of Akbar, sent him an ambassador to establish friendly relations.

== Siege of Daman, 1581 ==
In 1580, Diogo Lopes Coutinho de Santarém at the head of a force of eight ships had a village near Surat burned, after its garrison had killed six Portuguese who had gone ashore. At the request of the Mughal governor of Surat Caliche Mahamed, the Mughal governor of Bharuch Qutub ud-Din Khan (Cutubidicam in Portuguese) joined forces into an army of 15,000 men, war elephants and a cannon to attack Daman.

Portuguese reinforcements flowed into Daman by sea while the Mughals attacked the surrounding territory of Daman. Despite their numerical advantage, facing stiffer resistance than anticipated the Mughals hesitated in assaulting the unwalled city and withdrew their army after six months of maneuvers and skirmishes.

== Battle of Valsad, 1582 ==
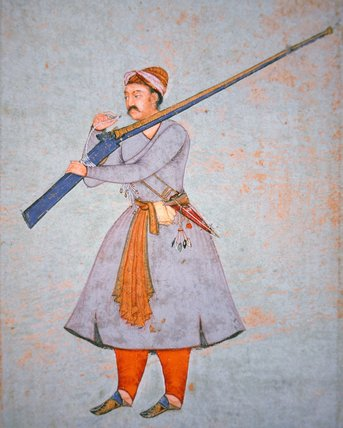
Mughal officer with matchlock, c. 1585.

Wishing to undertake the Hajj pilgrimage to Mecca, Emperor Akbar's aunt Gulbadan Begum gifted Valsad to the Portuguese in 1572 while waiting for a Portuguese naval pass at Surat so as to ensure a safe passage. Upon her return and no longer needing to be on good terms with the Portuguese she demanded that Valsad be retaken and troops were dispatched from Surat to occupy the town but they were routed by the Portuguese with considerable loss.

== Luso-Mughal War 1613-1615 ==
The years up to 1613 were marked by affinity between the Mughal capital and the capital of the Portuguese State of India. After the Battle of Swally however, the Mughals allowed the East India Company to set up a trading post at Surat and as reprisal the Portuguese seized the Rahimi, the largest imperial Mughal merchant ship. The ship belonged to Emperor Jahangir's mother Mariam-uz-Zamani, and was carrying cargo worth 200,000 pounds (equivalent to half a billion rupees) along with 700 persons. Although the ship was carrying the necessary Portuguese pass and did not violate any terms applied on it, still, out of spite at the new Mughal friendship with the English, the Portuguese acted "contrary to their pass" and carried off "the Rahimi" with all of her richly laden cargo to Goa. Jeronimo de Azevedo celebrated the capture of the Rahimi as "worthy prey that was brought and for giving the Mughals a cause of sorrow."

When it became clear that the Portuguese had no intention of returning the Queen Mother's ship, Jahangir sent Muqarrab Khan, his regional governor, to stop all shipping activities at Surat, the major hub of seagoing trade, and to lay siege to the Portuguese town of Daman.

The Mughals also launched a combined land and naval campaign against Portuguese outposts in Surat and Cambay, spearheaded by Khwaja Jahan; The Mughal forces, capitalizing on their numerical strength and control over Gujarat, besieged Portuguese fortifications, severed their trade routes, and captured goods and personnel. Logistically, the Mughals deployed local garrisons and coastal vessels to blockade Portuguese supply lines, leveraging their dominance over the region’s hinterland. Jahangir also threaten to launch attacks against Portuguese controlled settlements across the Konkan coast.

In November 1614, Jahangir escalated the conflict as he ordered the imperial forces to besiege several more colonies and ports of the Portuguese, including another attack on Daman. Facing with this development, the Portuguese tried to negotiate peace by compensation for the Emperor for the goods and ships they had seized. However, Jahangir out right rejected the offer, as he declared that all of the realm will be no longer subjected to the Portuguese. The Emperor followed this by expelling all the Portuguese from the imperial court and imprison two Jesuits. Due to this conflict, all the trading activities of the Portuguese in India ceased to exist, while the English gained favor in the court of the Mughals. The territory of Daman was invaded by a Mughal detachment from Surat and in mid-1614, they clashed with reinforcements dispatched from Goa under the command of Luiz de Brito, who forced the Mughals to withdraw. The city of Bharuch was then sacked and the surrounding region pillaged by the forces of Brito. Portuguese trade with the Mughal Empire ceased during the conflict, providing the English East India Company with an unexpected windfall.

By mid-1615, the Portuguese, overwhelmed by sustained Mughal pressure and unable to secure reinforcements, surrendered, releasing the Rahimi’s passengers and cargo and accepting Mughal trade terms. This resounding victory solidified Mughal authority along the Gujarat coast, diminished Portuguese regional influence, and set a precedent for asserting Mughal dominance in dealings with European powers. The Jesuit church in Agra was closed.

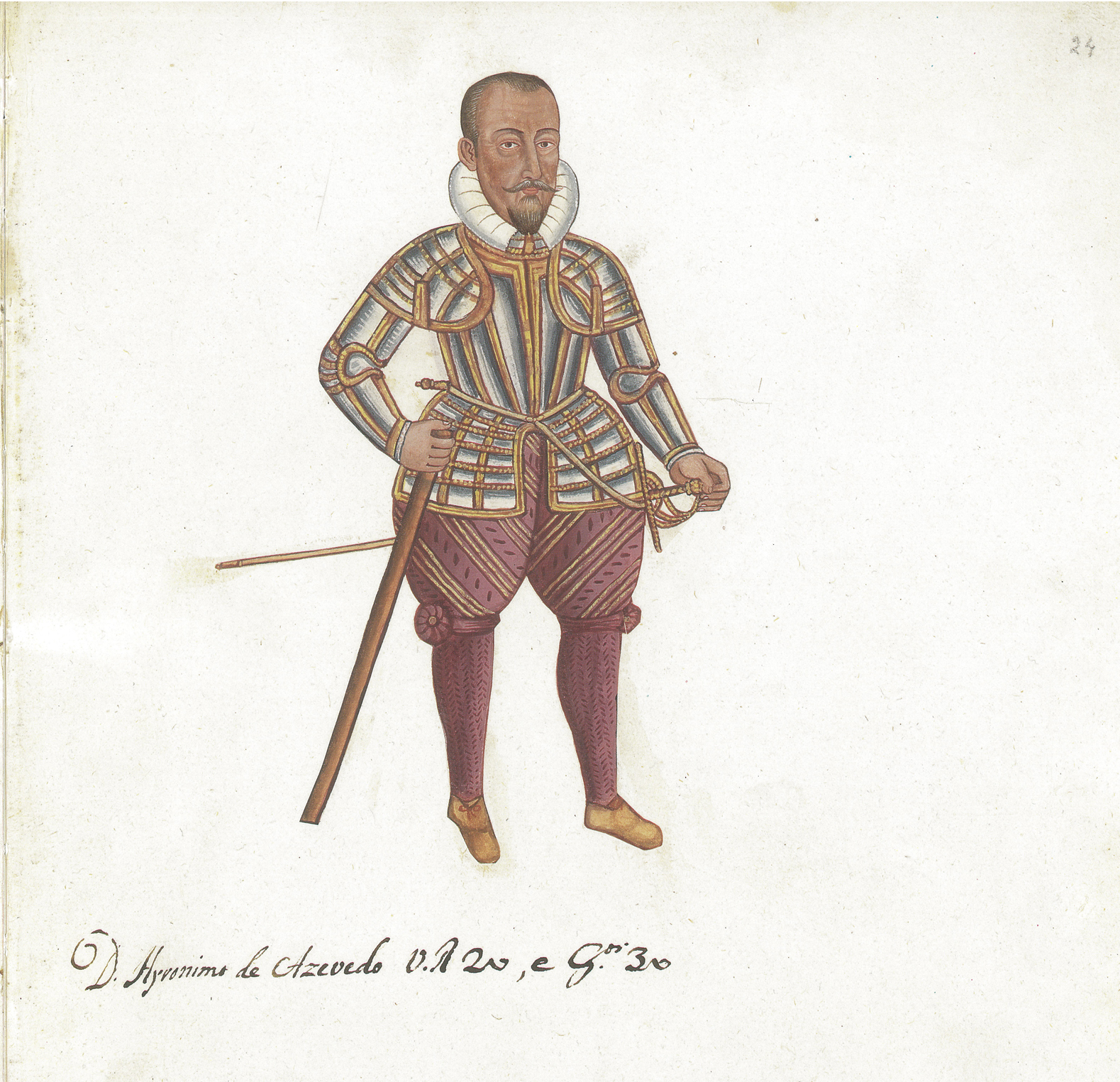
Viceroy of India Dom Jerónimo de Azevedo.

The Portuguese Viceroy of India Dom Jerónimo de Azevedo compensated the Mughals and reestablished bilateral relations. Azevedo then sent Jerónimo Xavier, grandnephew of Jesuit missionary Francis Xavier to negotiate peace. However, the Portuguese envoy was unable to extract promise from Jahangir to expel the English and the Dutch from India due to the emperor being so impressed by the outcome of the two english victories against the Portuguese in naval battle in Surat in 1614 and 1615, and also probably because Jahangir started to favor Thomas Roe, the English envoy at the Mughal court.

== Mughal-Arakan conflict 1614-1616 and 1666 ==
Between 1614-1616, Mughal Subahdar of Bengal Qasim Khan Chishti faced a combined attack of Arakanese and Portuguese forces. Because of a rift between these forces, Qasim Khan managed to thwart the expedition.

On 27 January 1666 AD, the allied forces of the Portuguese Empire and Arakan Kingdom of Mrauk U were defeated by the Mughal forces under the command of Buzurg Umed Khan, the son of Mughal Subedar Shaista Khan.

== Luso-Mughal Crisis, 1630 ==
A crisis between the Portuguese State of India and the Mughal Empire erupted in March 1630 when captain Dom Francisco Coutinho de Ocem captured two large Mughal trade ships in the Surat harbour for lacking cartazes, one of which belonged to Shah Jahan. Another large Mughal trade ship was apprehended by Dom Francisco in September, however a treaty was negotiated in November and further conflict averted.

== Siege of Hooghly, 1632 ==
In 1578, the Portuguese merchant Pedro Tavares had obtained authorization from the Mughal Court for Portuguese merchants to settle at Hooghly. Although the city came to contain a large community of Portuguese traders, churches and monasteries, it was not officially part of the Portuguese Empire.

Having received complaints of illegal Portuguese activities in the region and angered that the Portuguese did not support his revolt, Shah Jahan ordered the destruction of Hooghly. Although the city was unwalled and defended by no more than 300 Portuguese it was only taken after a three-month siege and its inhabitants taken captive to Agra. The viceroy of India interceded on behalf of the Portuguese traders and they were allowed to resettle in Bengal the following year.

== Luso-Mughal War 1638-1639 ==
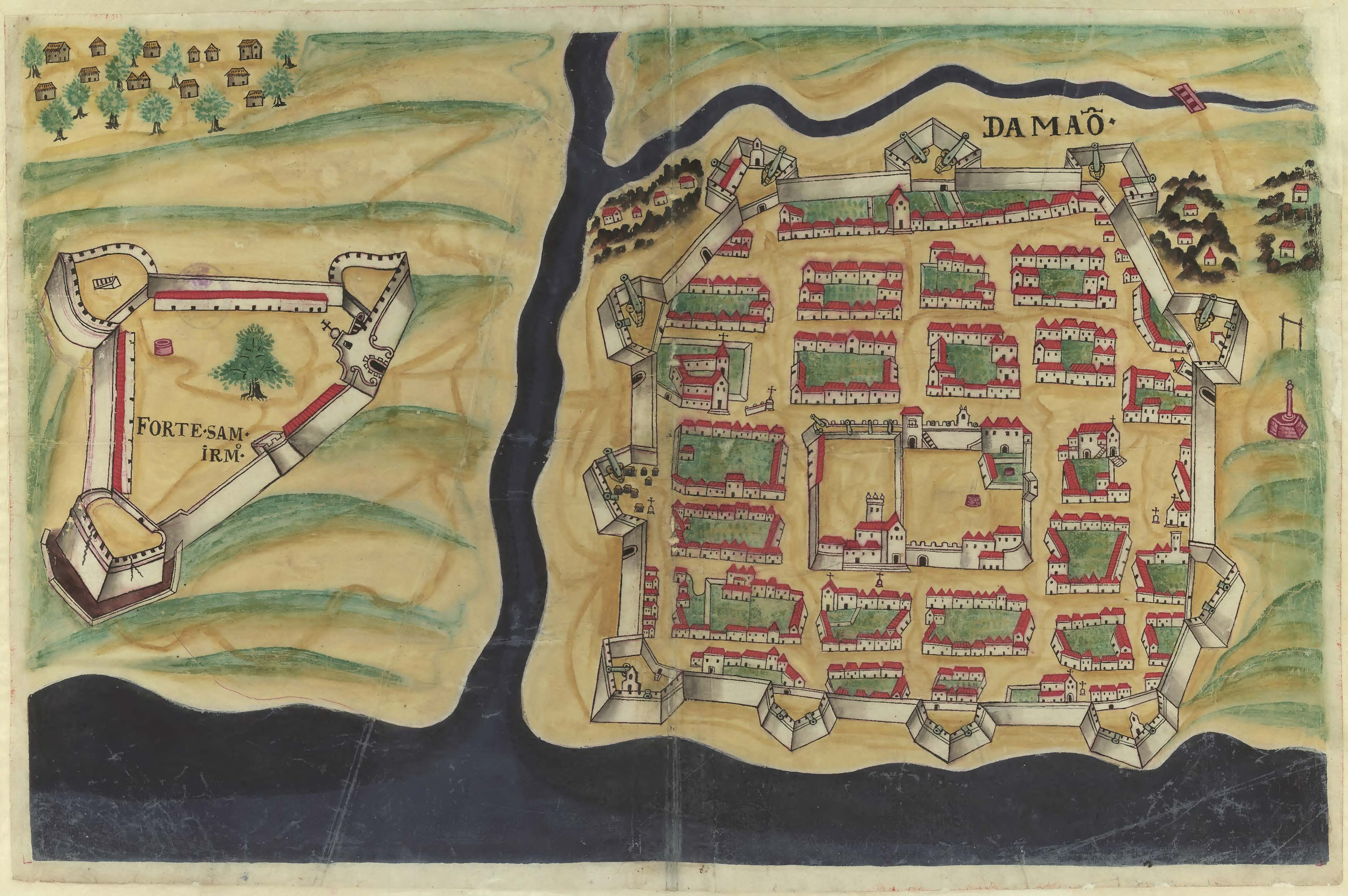
The forts of Daman.

After being appointed viceroy of the Deccan, Prince Aurangzeb determined to attack Daman. In late 1638 a Mughal army of 10,000 to 40,000 men invaded Portuguese territory and set up camp at Magravará, two miles from the city.

Reinforcements flowed into Daman by sea and the Portuguese conducted limited attacks against the Mughals. Although the siege was closely fought, on the evening of January 5, 1639, the Portuguese captain of the city nevertheless offered William Methwold refreshments when his ship docked there. Because the Mughals were unable to cut the naval supply lines to Daman, the Portuguese were able to continuously reinforce the city.

Unable to break through Portuguese defenses despite their numerical superiority, the Mughals requested peace through the Governor of Surat Mir Musa, with the help of the president of the English East India Company factory at Surat, and later lifted the siege, having lost between 700 and 7000 men in the action.

== 1665-1666 conflicts in Bengal ==
On November 9, 1665, Mughal naval commander Abul Hussain (also known as Ibn Husain), under orders from Bengal Subahdar Shaista Khan, launched an expedition from Dhaka against the pirate stronghold of Sandwip Island, ruled independently by the 80-year-old Dilawar Khan (Raja Dilal) for nearly 50 years. In the initial engagement, Dilawar's forces wounded Hussain, who hesitated to pursue the ruler into the island's jungles and withdrew to Noakhali after spotting an approaching Arakanese relief fleet that ultimately retreated without clashing. Shaista Khan swiftly reinforced the Mughals with 141 additional boats, 1,500 musketeers and gunners, and 400 cavalry under commanders Jamal Khan, Serandaz Khan, Qaramal Khan, and Muhammad Beg. On November 18, the bolstered fleet renewed the assault, capturing Dilawar's son Sharif Khan (after wounding him) and, following severe fighting, Dilawar himself along with his followers; the defenders were then imprisoned and sent to Jahangirnagar (Dhaka). This "long and bloody" victory, aided by Dutch military support and recent Portuguese defections from Arakanese service, secured Sandwip as a vital naval base for the impending Chittagong campaign. In 1666, Shaista Khan led the campaign to Chittagong and expelled the Portuguese and Magh defender with 300 flotillas.

== Luso-Mughal War, 1692-1693 ==
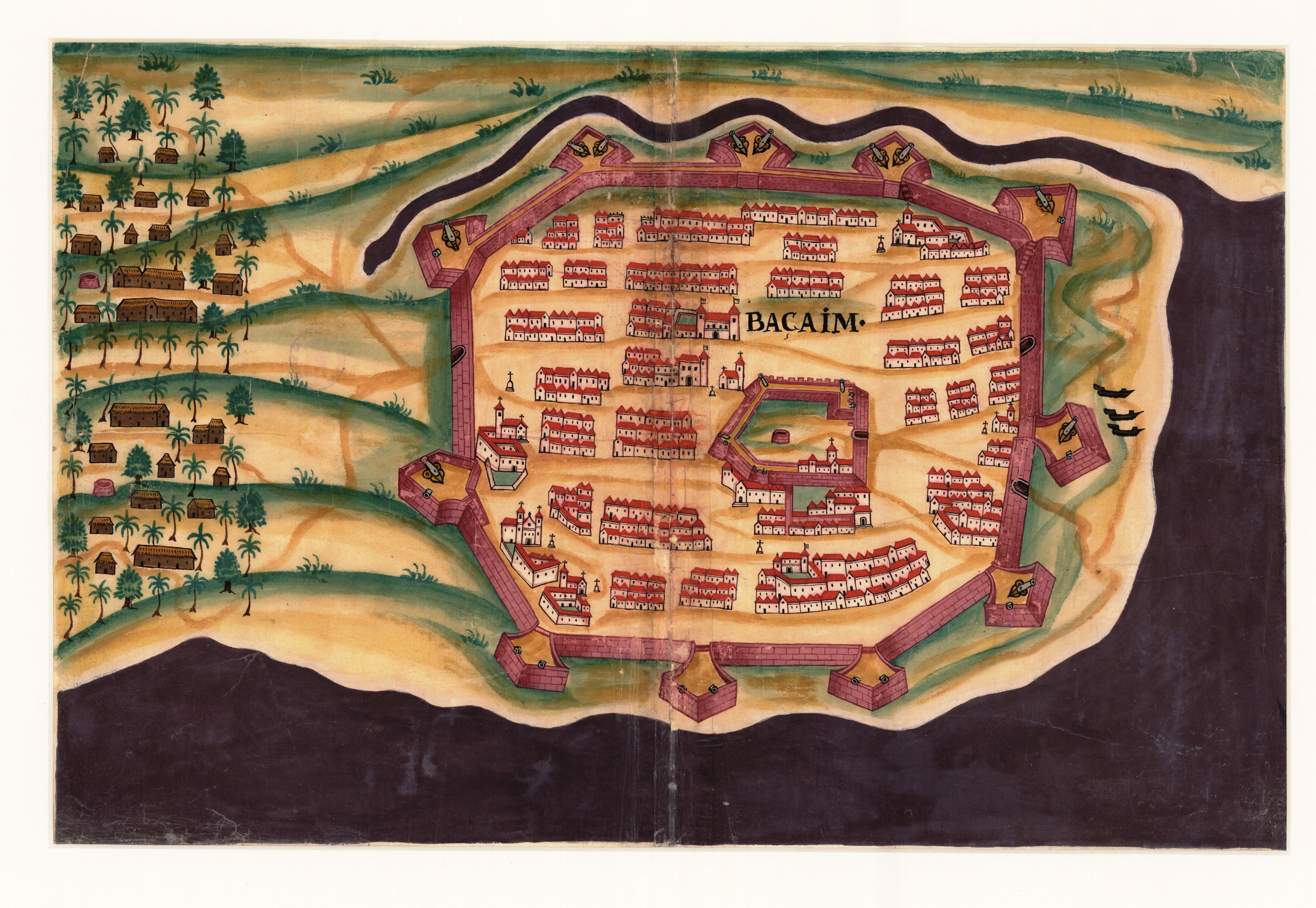
The Portuguese fortress of Bassein.

While at war with the Maratha Empire, a Mughal army sought to pass through Portuguese territory near Bassein, however this was refused by the Portuguese. As the Mughal general Matabar Khan accused the Portuguese of favouring the Marathas and harbouring the families of their officers, in 1692 he invaded Portuguese territory and pillaged the region of Bassein.

By diplomatic means however, the Portuguese viceroy Pedro António de Meneses Noronha de Albuquerque got Emperor Aurangzeb to order the cessation of hostilities. Matabar Khan was instructed to return any prisoners of war and compensate the Portuguese with 200,000 rupees.

== Aftermath ==
Conflict with the Portuguese caused the Mughal Empire to gradually turn to the English East India Company for trade.

Portuguese maritime supremacy was complete as far as the Mughals were concerned, as the Mughals paid the Portuguese tolls to sail the Indian Ocean.

As a land-based power, the Mughals did not wish to hostilize the Portuguese because it could result in reprisals against Mughal merchant ships and most importantly disturb the naval Hajj pilgrimage route from Surat to Mecca, which they sought to present themselves as sponsors and protectors of. Mughal trade ships were still required to acquire Portuguese naval licenses to sail the Indian Ocean and they cost between 3000 and 8000 mahmudis. They also sought the sympathy of the Portuguese to check the activities of the Marathas in the Konkan. The Portuguese sought to preserve their territory in India against the Mughals.

Although open conflicts tended to be avoided, the Portuguese Viceroy of India covertly supported the Marathas against the Mughals and promoted anti-Mughal alliances in the Deccan with Ahmadnagar, Bijapur and Golkonda.

After the Maratha conquest of Konkan and Gujarat in the 18th century, contact between Portuguese India and the by then declining Mughal Empire ceased.

== See also ==
- Military history of Portugal
- Portuguese India
- Adil Shahi–Portuguese conflicts
- Gujarati-Portuguese conflicts
  - Portuguese conquest of Daman
- Foreign relations of the Mughal Empire
- Mughal weapons
- Mughal artillery
  - Prangi
- Mughal conquest of Gujarat

== Bibliography ==
- Findly, Ellison Banks (April–June 1988). "The Capture of Maryam-uz-Zamānī's Ship: Mughal Women and European Traders". Journal of the American Oriental Society. 108 (2). American Oriental Society: 227–238. doi:10.2307/603650. JSTOR 603650.
- Findly, Ellison Books (1993). Nur Jahan. Oxford University Press. ISBN 9780195074888.
- Habib, Irfan (1997). Akbar and His India. New Delhi: Oxford University Press. ISBN 978-0-19-563791-5.
