= Siege of Daman (1581) =

Siege of Daman 1581
- Part of Mughal–Portuguese conflicts
| Date | 1581 |
| Location | Daman, India |
| Result | Portuguese victory |

Belligerents
| (Portugal) Portuguese Empire | Mughal Empire |

Commanders and leaders
| Martim Afonso de Melo | Qutub ud-Din Khan; Caliche Mahamed |

Strength
| 1,000 men | 15,000 men |

The siege of Daman in 1581 was a military engagement between Portuguese forces and those of the Shah of Gujarat in the city of Daman, in India. A Mughal army engaged the Portuguese in an attempt to set up a siege, but was forced to withdraw.

== Context ==
In 1571, the Mughals conquered the Gujarat Sultanate, bringing them to the border of Portuguese territories around Diu, Daman and Bassein. In 1580, Diogo Lopes Coutinho de Santarém at the head of a force of eight ships had a village near Surat burned, after its garrison had killed six Portuguese who had gone ashore. At the request of the Mughal governor of Surat Caliche Mahamed, the Mughal governor of Bharuch Qutub ud-Din Khan (Cutubidicam in Portuguese) joined forces into an army of 15,000 men, war elephants and a cannon to attack Daman.

== The siege ==
Warned of Mughal preparations, the Portuguese captain of Daman Martim Afonso de Melo dispatched messengers to neighbouring villages ordering its inhabitants and peasants to evacuate to Bassein or seek refuge in the forests, and to nearby Portuguese garrisons such as Bassein or Chaul and to Goa asking for reinforcements.

Caliche led the vanguard of the Mughal army with 1000 horsemen in the invasion of Portuguese territory, and he burned numerous villages while Qutub ud-Din Khan set up camp in the vicinity of the city. Melo was kept up to date of Mughal movements through spies or scouts which he continuously kept afield, while fortifying the city.

From Goa the viceroy Dom Francisco de Mascarenhas dispatched reinforcements to Daman. Within a short time, such a large number of volunteer soldiers and fidalgos disembarked at Daman to reinforce it that the Mughal commander was dissuaded from attacking the city and limited operations to pillaging what he could from the countryside. The Portuguese captain of the fort of Danu with 50 men skirmished with the Mughals, and captured a banner.

The Mughals eventually assembled their army south of Daman in a crescent formation, and a number of Portuguese troops positioned themselves in the outskirts of the city, while a detachment of Portuguese horsemen under the command of Fernão de Miranda rode further afield close to the Mughals. The Mughal officer Calicham rode up to Daman challenging Miranda for a single duel; Miranda pierced him with a spear, wounding him, and after this he withdrew to his ranks.

The Portuguese proceeded to skirmish with the Mughals in the field. From the opposite banks of the Daman Ganga River, the Mughals bombarded Daman with some pieces, doing little damage. As the Portuguese hesitated in committing fully and the Mughal commander did not wish to try and directly assault Daman, the Mughals eventually withdrew their forces. The siege lasted six months.

== Aftermath ==
After the Mughal army had retired, the Portuguese found that Ramana da Rama, ruler of a small neighbouring kingdom called Sarzeta five leagues from Daman had taken possession of the belongings of the refugees who had sought shelter in his realm, and refused to restore them. Consequently, the Portuguese plundered his capital, which they identified as Raumalaje.

== See also ==
- Portuguese India
