= Daman Ganga River =

River in western India

Daman Ganga
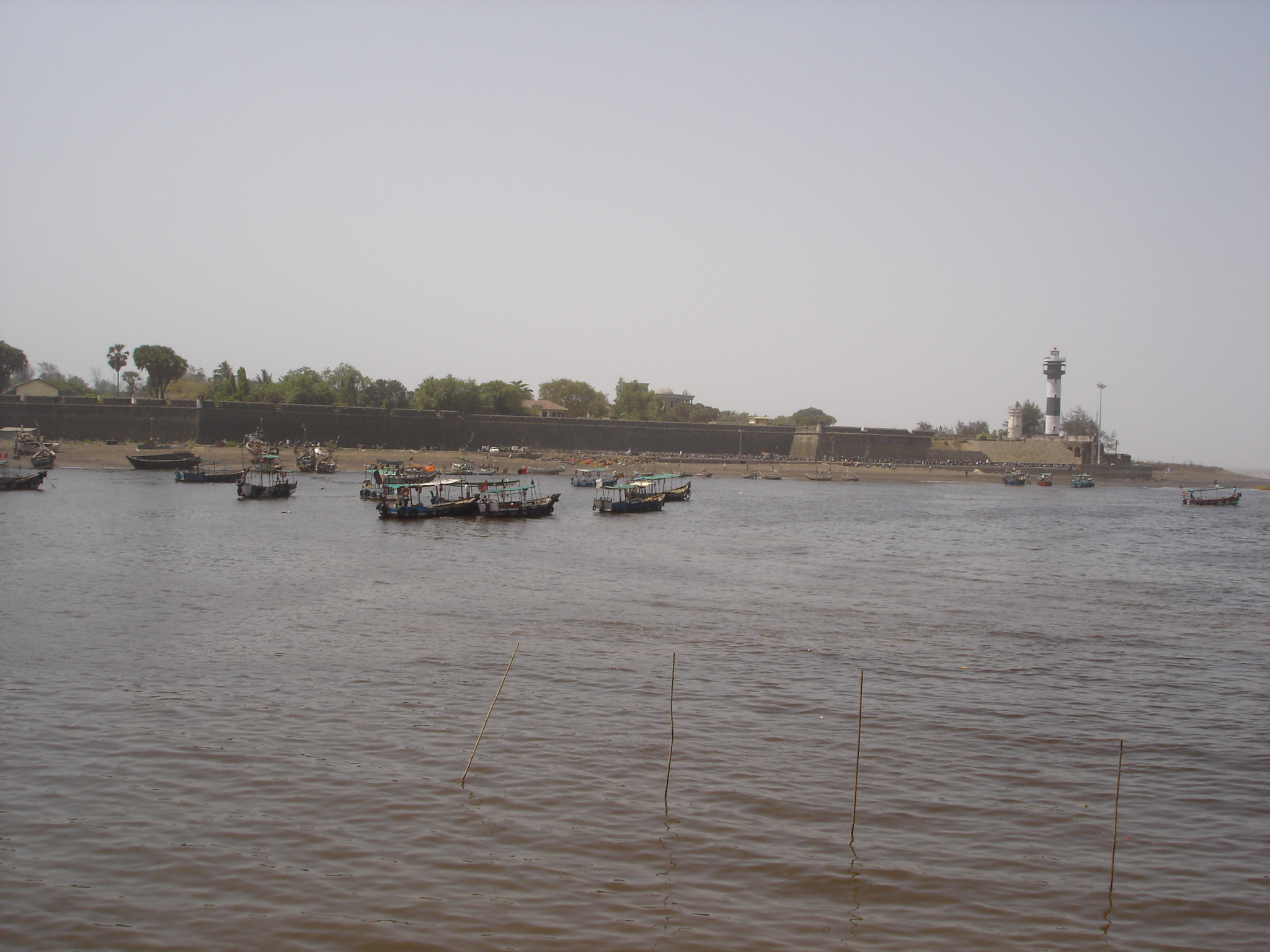
- Daman Ganga river at Daman.

Location
- Country: India
- State: Maharashtra, Gujarat

Physical characteristics
- Source: Ambegaon in Dindori taluka of Nashik district
  - location: Maharashtra, India
  - coordinates: 20°19′N 72°50′E
  - elevation: 950 m (3,120 ft)
- Mouth: Daman Estuary
  - location: Arabian Sea, India
  - elevation: 0 m (0 ft)
- Length: 131.30 km (81.59 mi)

The Daman Ganga, also called the Dawan River, is a river in western India. The river's headwaters are on the western slope of the Western Ghats range, and it flows west into the Arabian Sea. The river flows through Maharashtra and Gujarat states, as well as the Union territory of Dadra and Nagar Haveli and Daman and Diu. The industrial towns of Vapi, Dadra and Silvassa lie on the north bank of the river, and the town of Daman occupies both banks of the river's mouth.

The major development project on the river is the Daman Ganga Multipurpose project completed which benefits the state of Gujarat and the Union Territory of Dadra and Nagar Haveli and Daman and Diu. In 2015, a major river interlinking project involving inter-basin transfer of surplus water from the Daman Ganga called the "Daman Ganga-Pinjal River Linking Project" has been approved for implementation.

The two historical forts on either side of the river at Daman, are the Moti Daman ('Moti' means "big") on the southern bank and the Nani Daman ('Nani' means "small"), on the northern bank.

== Geography ==
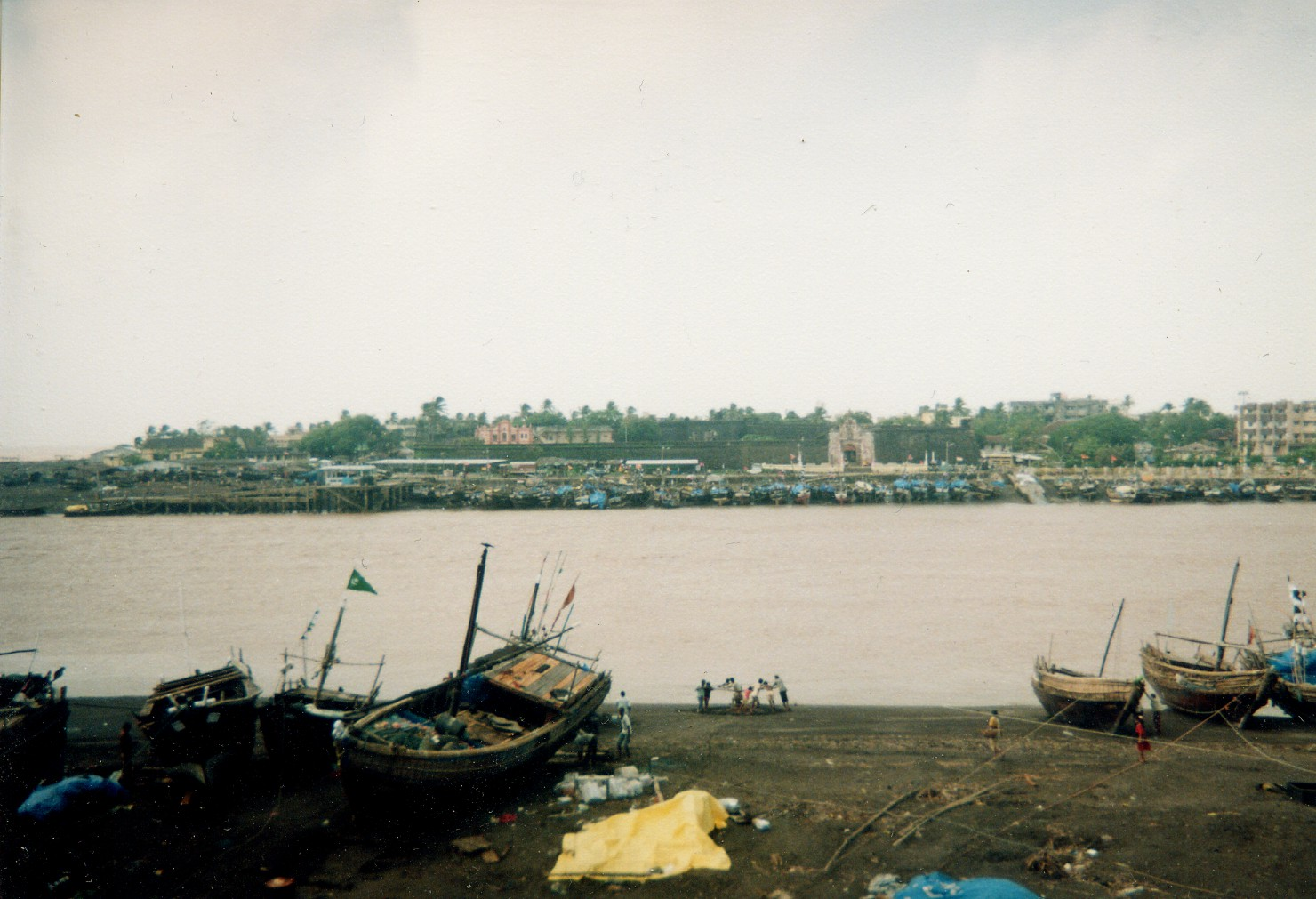
Nani Daman fort on the Daman Ganga at Daman

The Daman Ganga, also known as Dawan River, rises in the Sahyadri hills close to Ambegaon village in Dindori taluka of Nasik district of Maharashtra State. It rises at an elevation of 950 m. The Daman Ganga's main tributaries, the Daman and the Vag, run a course of 79 kilometres (49 mi) and 61 kilometres (38 mi) respectively before joining at Matunji to become the Daman Ganga River. A major part of the river lies in Maharashtra. Its total length from source to the Arabian Sea is 131.30 kilometres (81.59 mi). Some major tributaries which rise in and flow through the mountainous region of the states of Maharashtra, Gujarat and the Union Territory of Dadra and Nagar Haveli and Daman and Diu are the Dawan, the Shrimant, the Val, the Rayate, the Lendi, the Wagh, the Sakartond, the Roshni, the Dudhni, and the Piperiya. As the river joins the sea at Daman, it is named Daman Ganga. Found at the mouth is heavy sedimentation and hence the depth of water is shallow. Daman is located on both banks of the river (Portuguese name: Rio Sandalcalo). At the mouth of the river the bar is a level bed made of hard sand, except for the North of the North point where the river enters the sea.

The river basin (part of the basin of west-flowing rivers from Tapi to Tadri), which lies entirely on the Western Ghats, has a total catchment area of 2,318 square kilometres (895 sq mi). The catchment area's distribution is as follows: In the Nashik district of Maharashtra 1,408 square kilometres (544 sq mi) (60.74%); in the Valsad district in Gujarat 495 square kilometres (191 sq mi) (21.36%); and in the Union territory of Dadra and Nagar Haveli and Daman and Diu it is 415 square kilometres (160 sq mi) (17.90%). The mean annual runoff from the catchment is 3,771 million cubic metres. The upstream area of the river is hilly and covered with 96,222 hectares (237,770 acres) of forest. Rainfall occurs during the monsoon months from June to September with an annual average rainfall incidence of approximately 2,200 millimetres (87 in) (the maximum recorded is reported to be 3,780 millimetres (149 in). The soil conditions in the basin are categorized as "reddish brown soil, coarse shallow soil, deep black soil and Coastal alluvial soil". Silvassa, Vapi and Daman are the major towns on the banks of the river.

The places of tourist interest on the Daman Ganga River in Dadra and Nagar Haveli are Van Ganga and Vandhara Garden. There are also two historical forts on either side of the river at Daman, which face each other, known as Moti Daman on the southern bank, the larger of the two and the Nani Daman, smaller in size, on the northern bank.

== Development ==
=== Damanganga Reservoir Project ===
There is an existing major irrigation project on the river called the Damanganga Reservoir Project, which is located near Madhuban village in Dharampur taluka of Valsad district of Gujarat. It is an inter-state multipurpose project of the Govt. of Gujarat and Union Territory of Dadra and Nagar Haveli and Daman and Diu (DNHDD). The storage of this project is shared by the riparian state of Gujarat and Union Territory of DNHDD as the beneficiary region. The total volume of water to be shared is 516.63 million cubic metres (MCM), 420.50 MCM for irrigation and the balance 96.13 MCM for other uses, which is allotted to the riparian state and Union Territories; Gujarat has a share of 399.19 MCM, Dadra and Nagar Haveli's share is 83.33 MCM and Daman's is 34.20 MCM. The project was built from 1972 to 1998. It is a composite dam of masonry and earth-fill dams. The masonry dam of 58.6 m height has a spillway in the gorge section of the river of 350 m length; the spillway, with an ogee shape and a roller bucket for energy dissipation, is designed to rout a Probable Maximum Flood (PMF) discharge of 25,850 m^{3}/s controlled by 10 radial gates each of size 15.55 by 14.02 metres (51.0 ft × 46.0 ft). It has earthen dams on both its flanks which measure 2.87 kilometres (1.78 mi). The composite dam is founded in an area with geological formations of amygdaloidal basalt, porphyritic basalt, dolerite, and agglomerate.

At the Full Reservoir level the reservoir water spread is 5,144 hectares (12,710 acres) which includes 987 ha of wasteland and 2,955 hectares (7,300 acres) of agricultural land. Submergence also involved 12 villages completely and 24 villages partially. The Gross Command Area (GCA) is 77,935 hectares (192,580 acres) and the Cultural Command Area (CCA) of the irrigation is 5,118 hectares (12,650 acres) on the left and right bank canal network benefiting the states of Gujarat, Dadra and Nagar Haveli and Daman. The total length of the canals is 98.4 kilometres (61.1 mi) with a design discharge of 34.76 cubic metres (1,228 cu ft) per second in the right bank canal and 11.46 cubic metres (405 cu ft) per second on the left bank canal. The irrigation covers 112 villages in Valsad district, 26 villages in Daman, and 24 villages in Dadra Nagar Haveli. The Project provides a lot of water for industrial and domestic water needs and also has a small power plant of 2 MW capacity. The cost of the project was shared between the participating states as per the Inter-State Agreement of 1992.

The river supplies drinking water to Vapi town, industries around the town and 11 villages in Daman from the head works located at the pickup weir on the Daman Ganga River.

=== Daman Ganga-Pinjal River Linking Project ===
The Government of India's National Water Development Authority (NWDA) has proposed the Daman Ganga-Pinjal River Linking Project linking the Daman Ganga River to the Pinjal reservoir on the Pinjal River to the south, in the Vaitarna basin allowing surplus water from the Daman Ganga to be diverted south to Mumbai via the Pinjal reservoir. The feasibility report was prepared by NWDA in 2004, and in 2010 a tripartite agreement was signed between the Central government and the two state governments of Gujarat and Maharashtra. In January 2015, the project was approved for implementation.

Under this project the two reservoirs to be created by building dams are the Bhugad dam on Damanganga River in Gujarat and the Khargihill dam on the Vagh River near Behapada village in Thane in Maharashtra. The reservoirs will be linked by a pressure tunnel 16.85 kilometres (10.47 mi) long and 5 metres (16 ft) wide. The Bhugad-Khargihill and Khargihill-Pinjal tunnel which is totally in Maharashtra state is a 25.70 kilometres (15.97 mi) long and 5.25 metres (17.2 ft) diameter tunnel and will transfer the surplus waters to the extent of 909 MCM annually to Mumbai City to supplement the present domestic and industrial water supply system, from the Pinjal reservoir to Greater Mumbai; this part of the project is to be implemented as per plans evolved by the Municipal Corporation of Greater Mumbai (MCGM) and Mumbai Metropolitan Region Development Authority (MMRDA). The dam on the Daman Ganga at Bhugad will be a composite dam of 63.63 metres (208.8 ft) in height and 826.6 metres (2,712 ft) long, to create a gross storage of 426.39 MCM and a live storage of 400.00 MCM. The composite dam on the Vagh River at Khargihill is proposed to a maximum height of 75.62 metres (248.1 ft) and 572.80 metres (1,879.3 ft) in length with gross storage capacity of 460.79 MCM and live storage of 420.50 MCM. The Pinjal dam on the Pinjal River will be 681 metres (2,234 ft) long and will have gross storage of 413.57 MCM and live storage of 401.55 MCM. The annual water diversion to greater Mumbai will be 43.84 cubic metres (1,548 cu ft) per second. The implementation of the entire project is planned to be completed over a nine-year period.

== River pollution ==
The Damanganga River downstream of Vapi down to its mouth is polluted from the effluents emerging from the industrial and domestic wastes of Vapi town, Silvassa, Daman and Kachigaon. According to the Central Pollution Control Board's report the BOD value recorded at its monitoring station downstream of Kachogaon was a high of 30 mg/L. According to a study report of the Machhimar Adhikar Rahstriya Abhiyan due to the industrial effluents from Vapi town the dissolved oxygen level is very low and Mercury content in the groundwater in the town is about ninety-six times higher than the standards prescribed by the World Health Organization (WHO). Untreated effluents are directly discharged into the Damanganga and Kolak Rivers. This has resulted in pollution of the seawater to a limit of five nautical miles (9 km), seriously affecting fish life. The Common Effluent Treatment was also reported to be dysfunctional with about 1000 small-scale and artisanal fishermen in four to five villages getting affected on account of the Sarigam Industrial Association's effluent disposal pipeline.

== Gallery ==
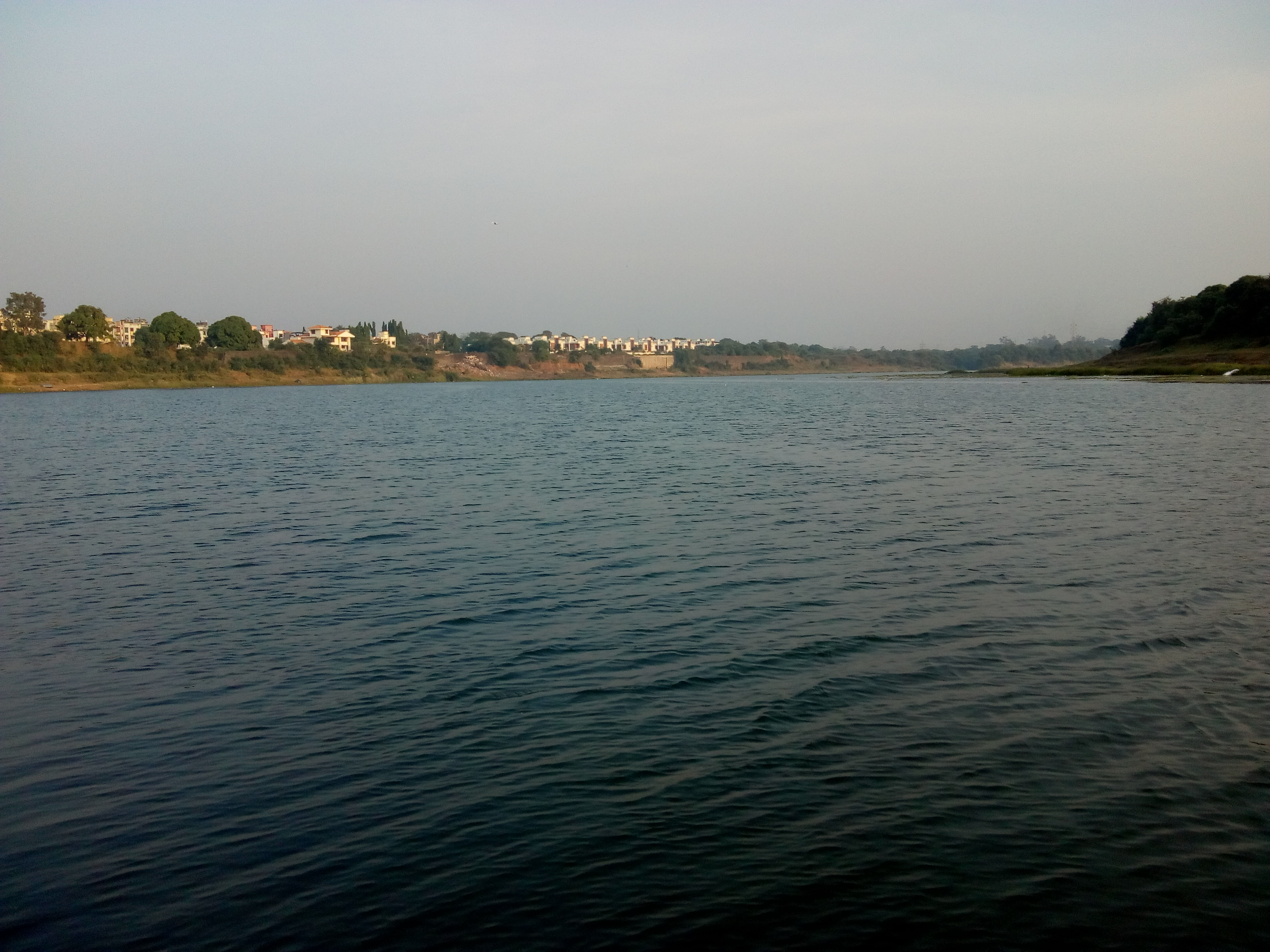
Daman Ganga River at Rameshwar Mahadev Temple Lavachha

== See also ==
- List of rivers of India
- Rivers of India

== Bibliography ==
- Agarwal, Pushpendra K.; Singh, Vijay P. (16 May 2007). Hydrology and Water Resources of India. Springer Science & Business Media. ISBN 978-1-4020-5180-7.
- Bansal, Sunita Pant (1 June 2005). Encyclopaedia of India. Smriti Books. ISBN 978-81-87967-71-2.
- Hoiberg, Dale (2000). Students' Britannica India: Select essays. Popular Prakashan. ISBN 978-0-85229-762-9.
- Singh, Kumar Suresh (1994). Daman and Diu. Popular Prakashan. ISBN 978-81-7154-761-6.
