= Daman, India =

Daman
- City
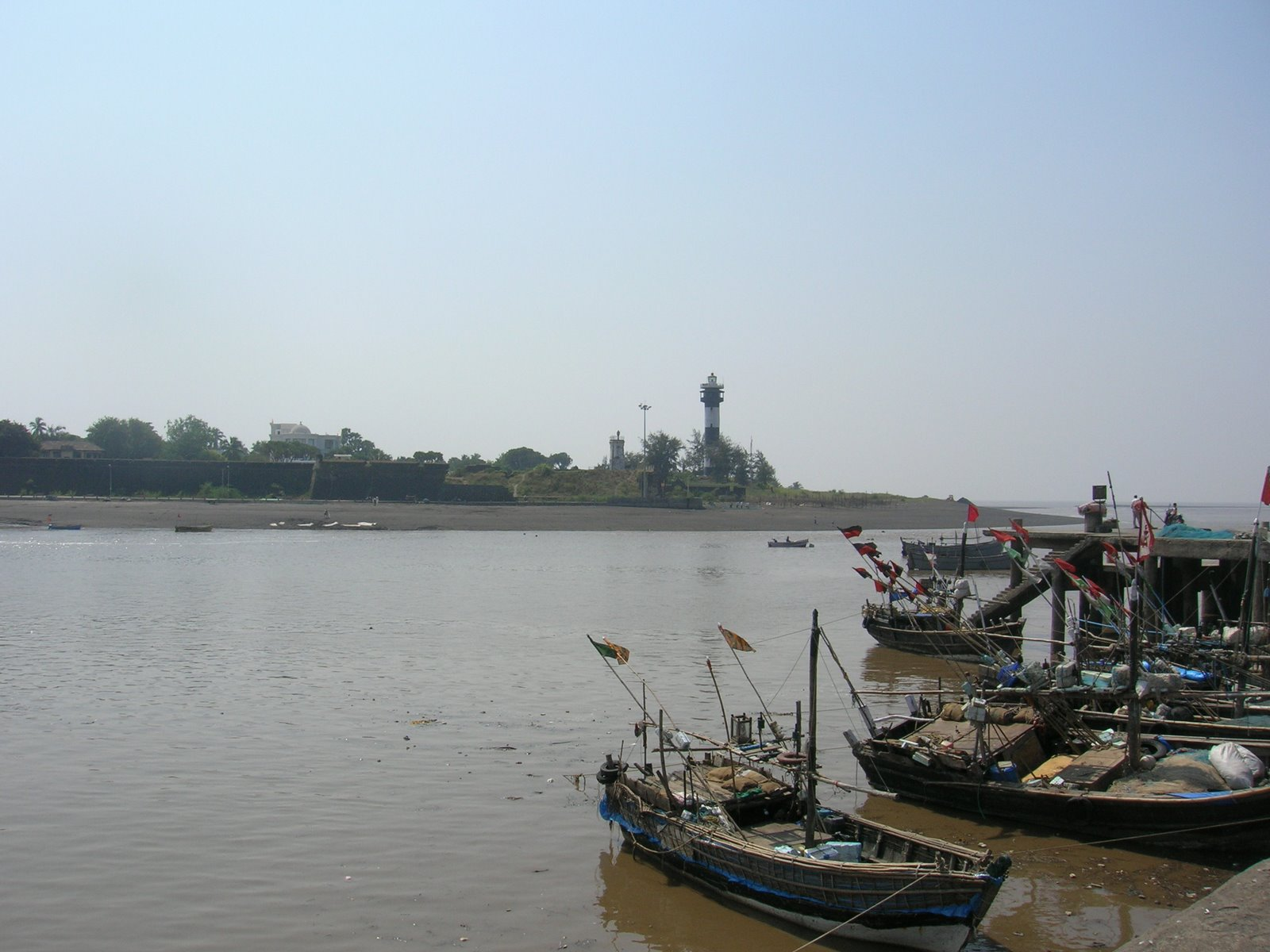
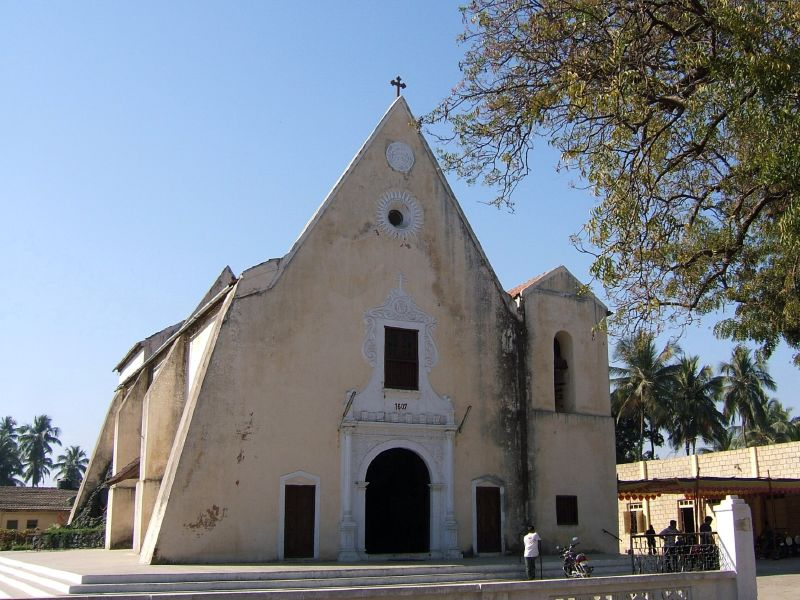
- Devka Beach, Daman Port of Daman Church of Bom Jesus Church of Our Lady of Remedios Jampore Beach

- Location within India Location within Gujarat
- Coordinates: 20.42°N 72.85°E
- Country: India
- Union territory: Dādra and Nagar Haveli and Damān and Diu
- District: Daman

Government
  - Type: Municipal Council
  - Body: Daman Municipal Council
  - Member of Parliament: Umeshbhai Patel
  - Council President: Sonal Issuarlal Patel

Area
  - Total: 6.5 km^{2} (2.5 sq mi)
- Elevation: 5 m (16 ft)

Population (2011 Census)
  - Total: 44,282
  - Density: 6,800/km^{2} (18,000/sq mi)
- Demonym: Damanese or Damãocar

Languages
  - Official: Hindi, Gujarati
- Time zone: UTC+5:30 (IST)
- Vehicle registration: DD-03
- Sex ratio: 1.69 ♂/♀
- Website: dmcdaman.in

Daman (IPA: [d̪əmən]) is a city and the administrative capital of the Indian union territory of Dadra and Nagar Haveli and Daman and Diu. It is a municipal council situated in the Daman district.

The Daman Ganga River divides Daman into: Nani-Daman (Little Daman) and Moti-Daman (Big Daman). Despite its name, Nani-Daman is the larger of the two parts, while the old city is mainly in Moti-Daman. This holds most of the important entities, like the major hospitals, supermarkets, and major residential areas. Vapi, Gujarat, is the nearest city to Daman.

== Etymology ==
The name "Daman" comes from the Daman Ganga River, while Diu is from the Sanskrit word dvipa, meaning “island.” From Mauryan times (4th–2nd century BCE), both were subject to various local and regional powers ruling in western India. In the 13th century Daman formed part of the Ramnagar state, which then became a tributary of the Gujarat sultans. Similarly, numerous dynasties in Kathiawar (Saurashtra) ruled Diu until it fell to the sultan of Gujarat in the early 15th century.

== History ==
The Portuguese Captain-Major Diogo de Melo arrived at the Daman shore by chance in 1523 while sailing towards Ormuz. He was caught in a violent storm and had his boat blown towards the coast of Daman. Shortly after, it was acquired as a Portuguese colony for over 400 years. A larger fort was built in Moti Daman in the 16th century to guard against the Mughals, who ruled the area until the Portuguese arrived. It stands today, most of it preserved in its original form. Today the majority of the municipal government offices are inside the fort.

Daman was incorporated into the Republic of India in December 1961 after nearly 400 years of Portuguese colonial rule which had largely led to exploitation of the area and native population. After refusal to vacate the occupied territory of mainland India, the Portuguese surrendered before the Indian Army, while some of its Army personnel deserted their posts and escaped to Karachi, Pakistan. The battle left four Indians dead and 14 wounded; Portuguese casualties were 10 dead and two wounded.

== Demographics ==
According to the 2011 census city of Daman had a population of 44,282, whereas Daman District had 191,173 inhabitants. This gives the district a ranking of 592nd in India (out of a total of 640). The city has a population density of 6,813 inhabitants per square kilometre (17,650/sq mi) and the district 2,655 inhabitants per square kilometre (6,880/sq mi). Its population growth rate over the decade 2001–2011 was 69.256%. Daman has a sex ratio of 533 females for every 1,000 males, and a literacy rate of 88.06%.

Religions in Daman
Religion	Percent
Hindus	89.73%
Muslims	8.41%
Christians	1.37%
Buddhists	0.14%
Jains	0.13%
Others†	0.3%
Distribution of religions †Includes Sikhs (0.2%), Buddhists (<0.2%).

== Climate ==
Daman has a tropical savanna climate (Köppen Aw) with two distinct seasons: a long, sunny dry season from October to May and a hot, very humid, and extremely wet monsoon season from June to September. Almost no rain falls during the dry season. With milder mornings and lower humidity especially up to the middle of March, this is by far the most comfortable time of the year.

The monsoon season, though relatively short, is extremely wet. Along with the very high humidity and heavy rain every afternoon, travel is difficult and uncomfortable.

Climate data for Daman, Daman and Diu (1961 to 1990)
Month	Jan	Feb	Mar	Apr	May	Jun	Jul	Aug	Sep	Oct	Nov	Dec	Year
Mean daily maximum °C (°F)	29.1 (84.4)	29.9 (85.8)	32.8 (91.0)	34.5 (94.1)	34.9 (94.8)	33.2 (91.8)	30.3 (86.5)	29.9 (85.8)	30.7 (87.3)	33 (91)	32.6 (90.7)	30.4 (86.7)	31.8 (89.2)
Mean daily minimum °C (°F)	15.7 (60.3)	16.6 (61.9)	20.3 (68.5)	20.7 (69.3)	26.5 (79.7)	26.5 (79.7)	25.3 (77.5)	24.8 (76.6)	24.3 (75.7)	22.6 (72.7)	19.2 (66.6)	16.5 (61.7)	21.6 (70.9)
Average rainfall mm (inches)	0 (0)	0 (0)	1 (0.0)	0 (0)	5 (0.2)	324 (12.8)	766 (30.2)	473 (18.6)	288 (11.3)	44 (1.7)	6 (0.2)	2 (0.1)	1,909 (75.1)
Source: climate-data.org

== Places of interest ==
- Fort São Jerónimo (St. Jerome Fort or Nani Daman Fort)
- Fort of Daman (Moti Daman Fort)
- Church of Bom Jesus
- Jain Temple: This 18th-century Jain temple is in the northern region of Nani Daman Fort and is dedicated to Mahavira Swami. It is built with white marble. The walls have glass covers with 18th-century murals that represent the life of Mahavira Swami.
- Jampore Beach
- Devka Beach
- Daman Freedom Memorial
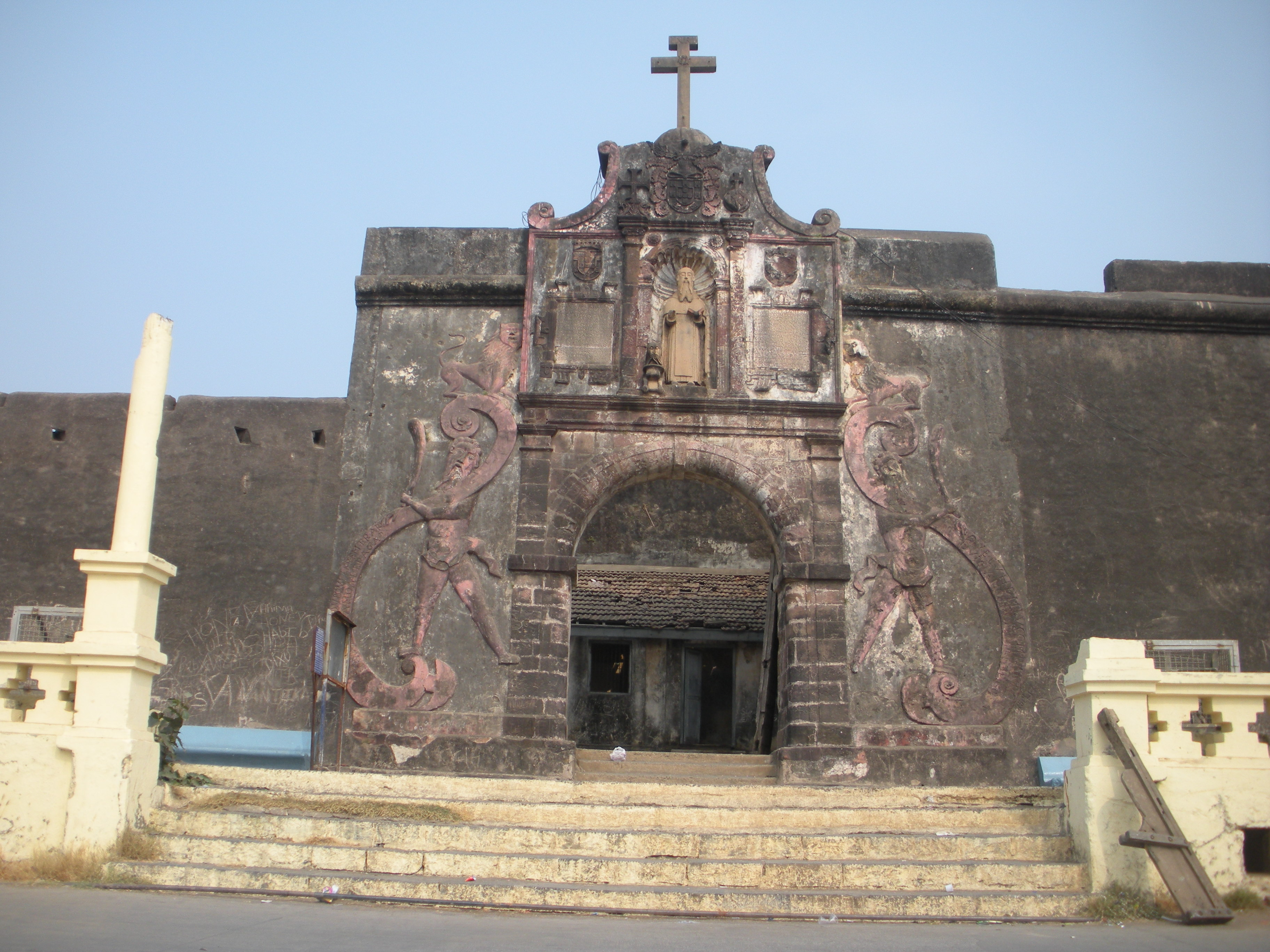
Nani Daman Fort Entrance

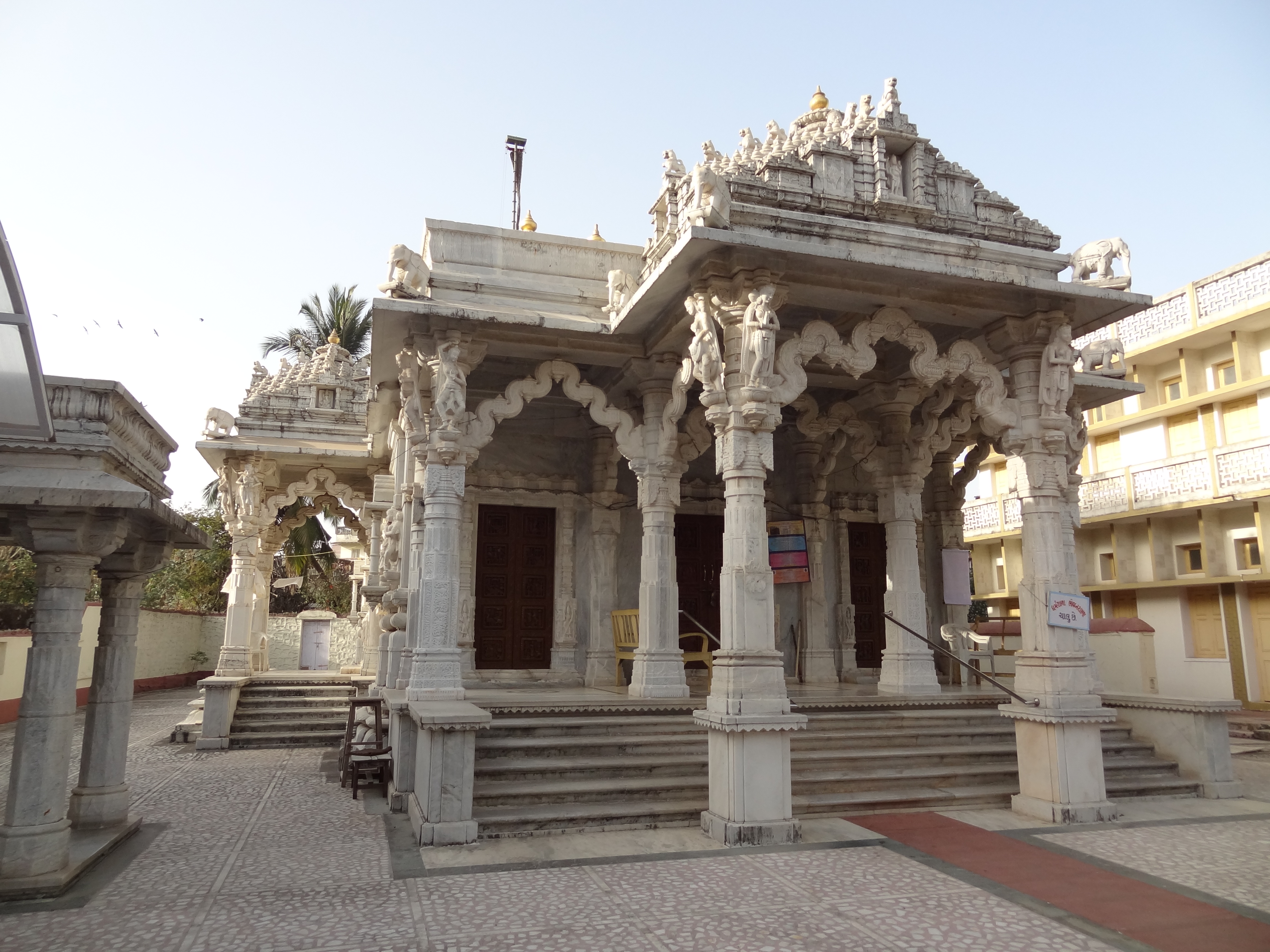
Jain Temple, Daman

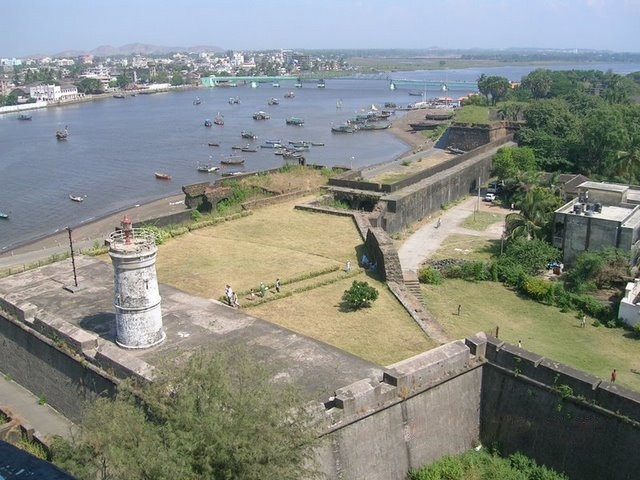
Harbour View from Moti Daman Fort

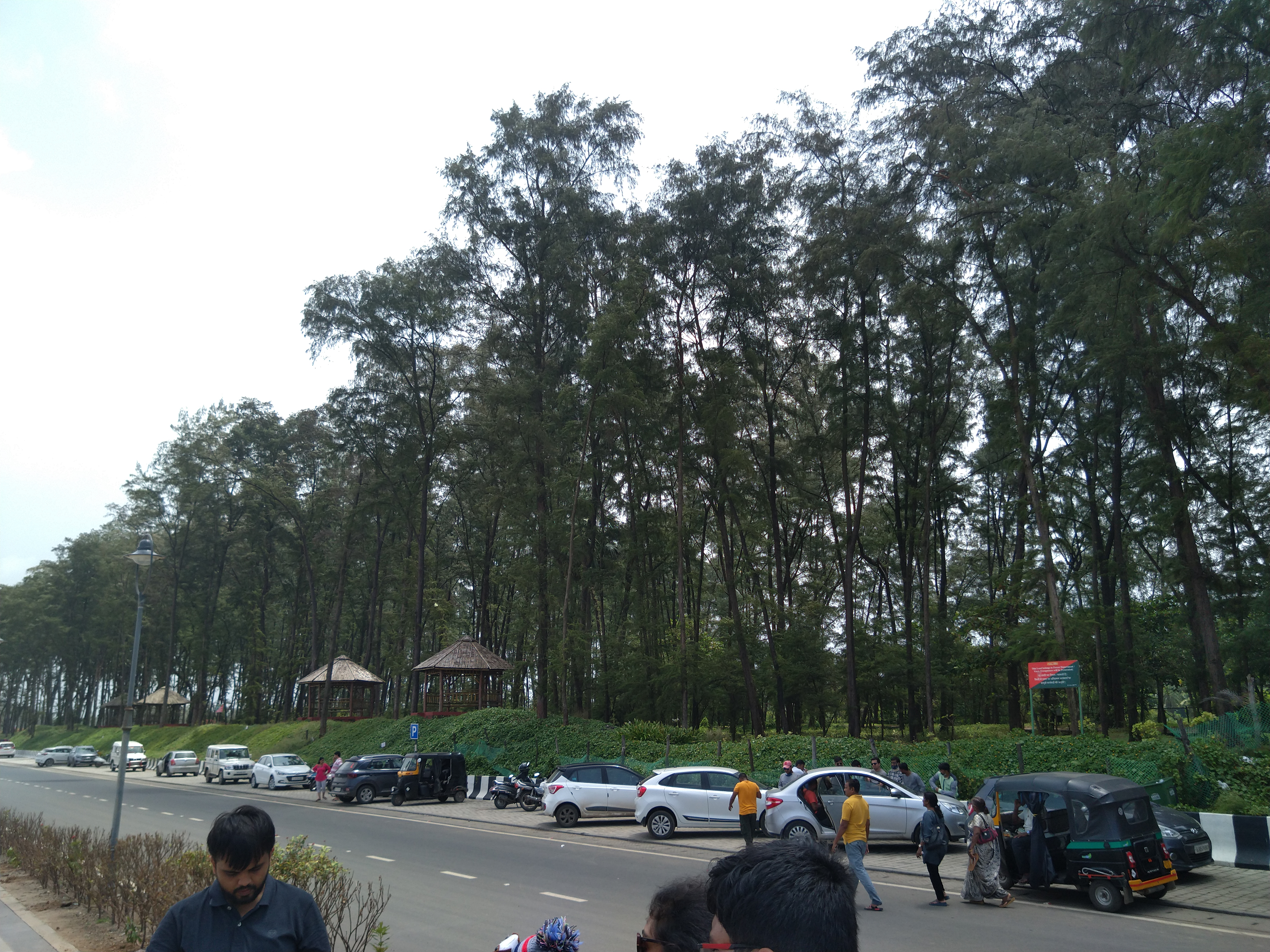
Jampore Beach in Daman

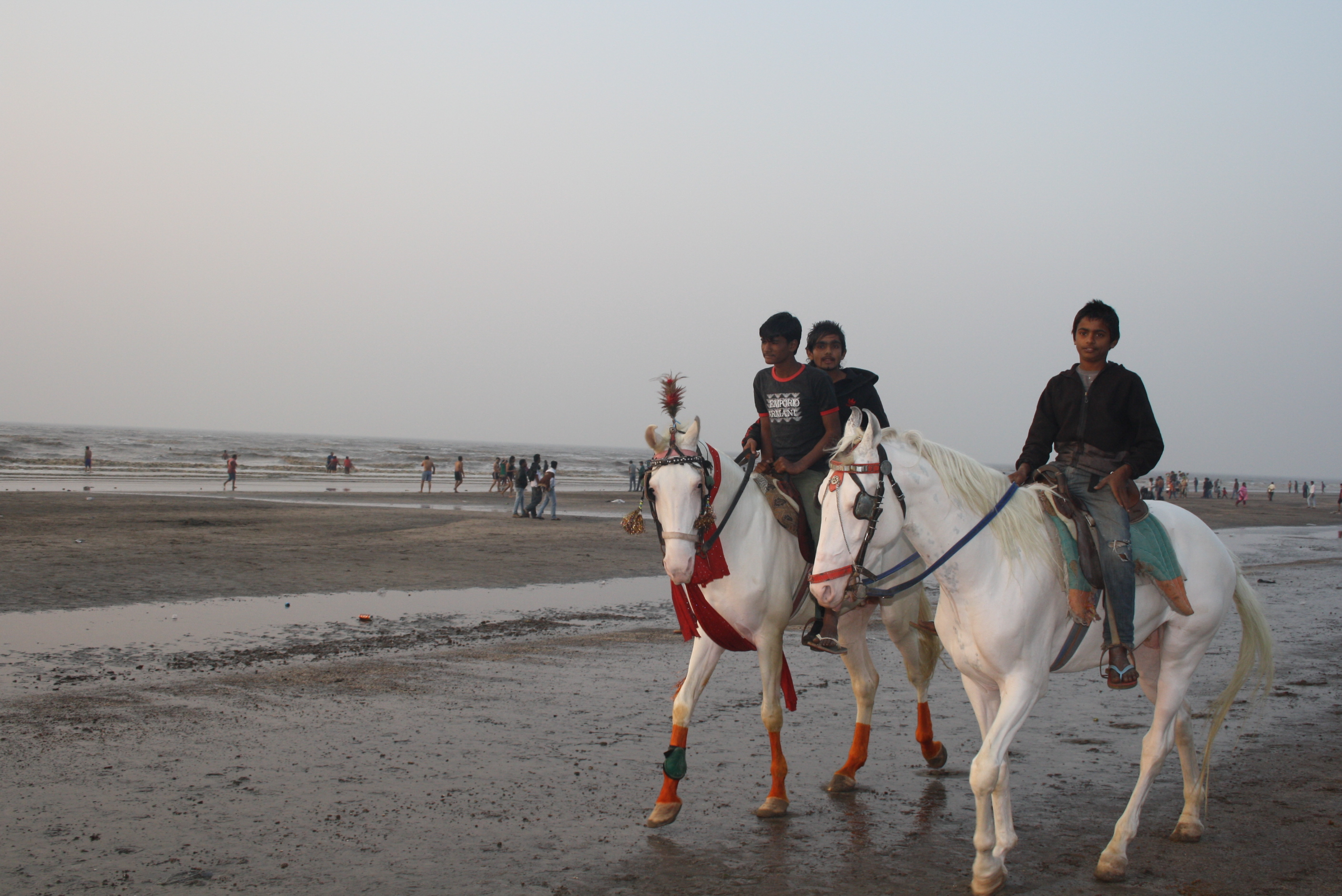
Jampore Beach in Daman

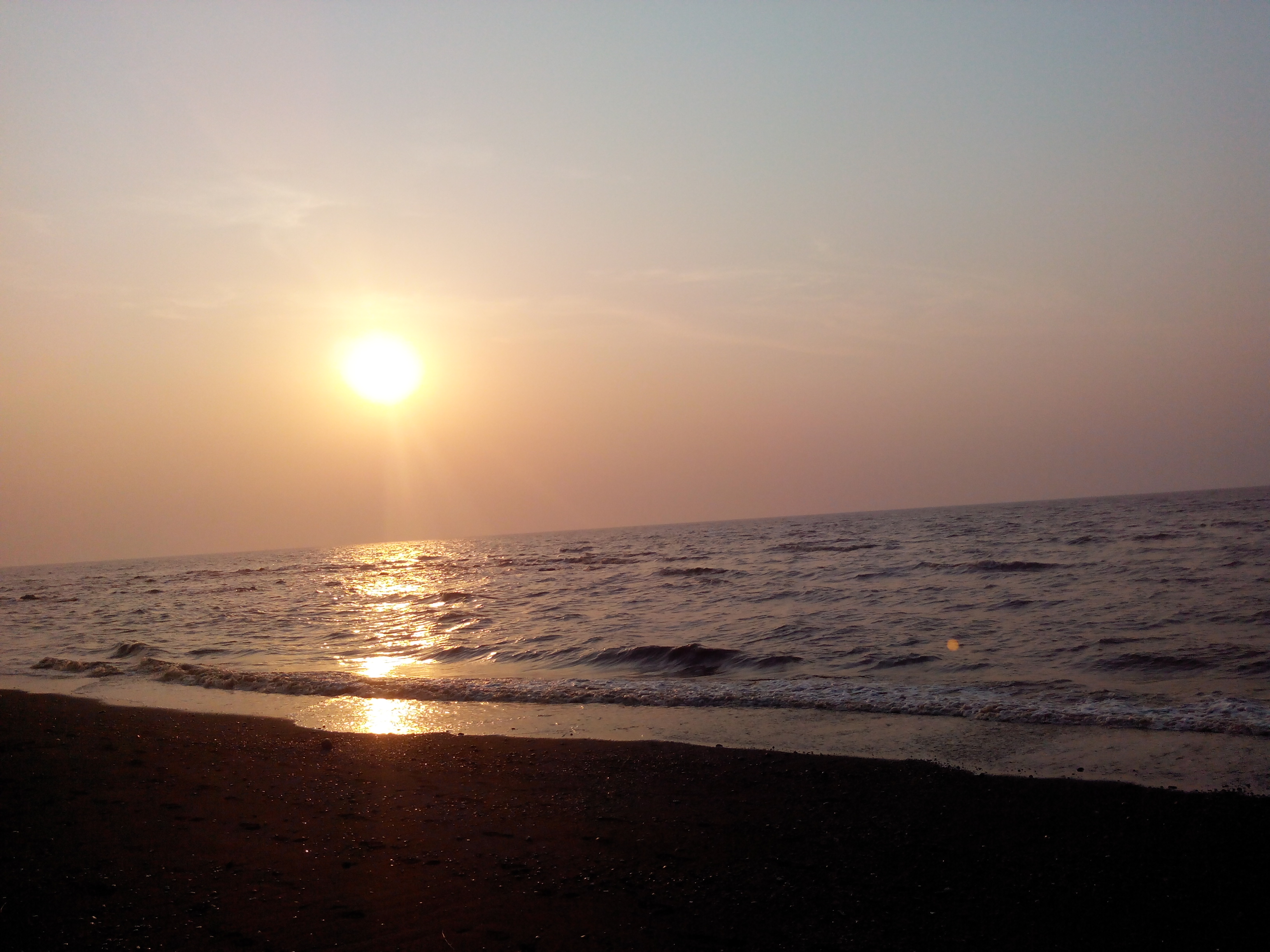
Sunset at Devka beach, Damao

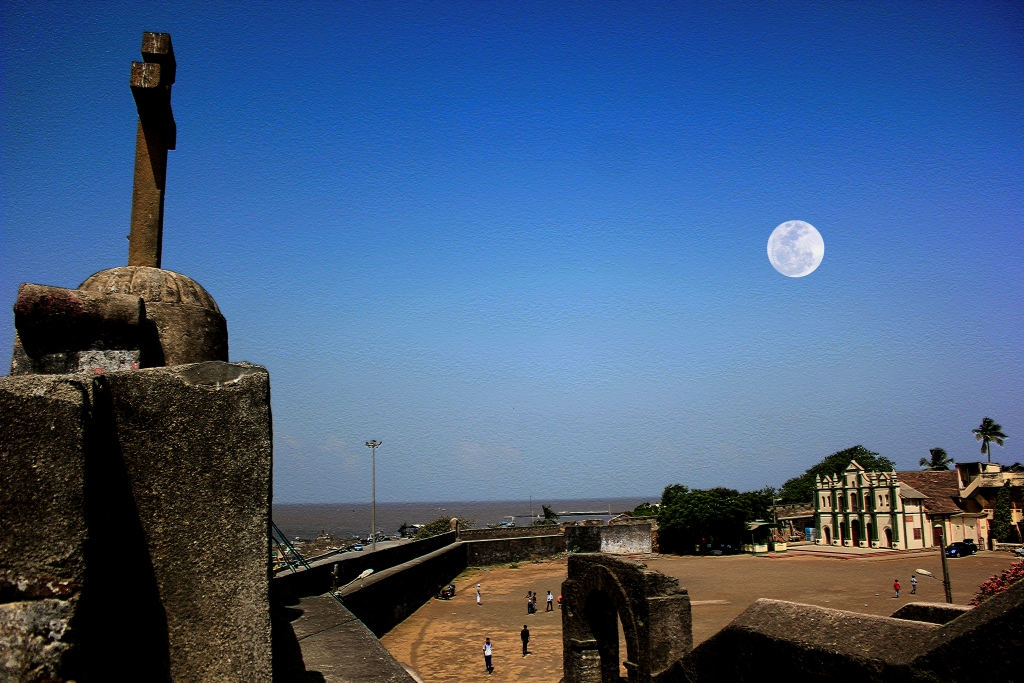
Church in Nani Daman Fort

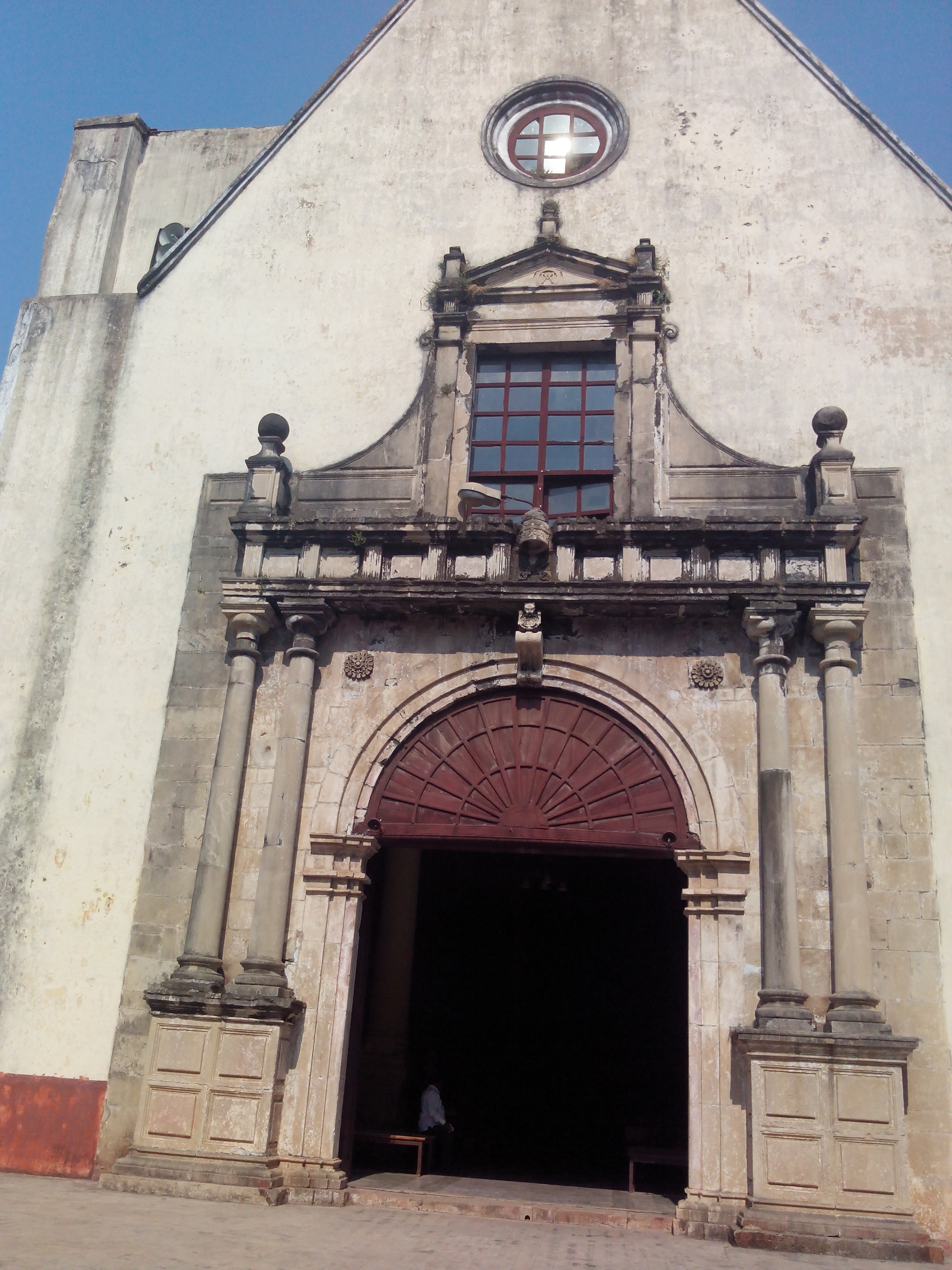
Church of Bom Jesus, Daman

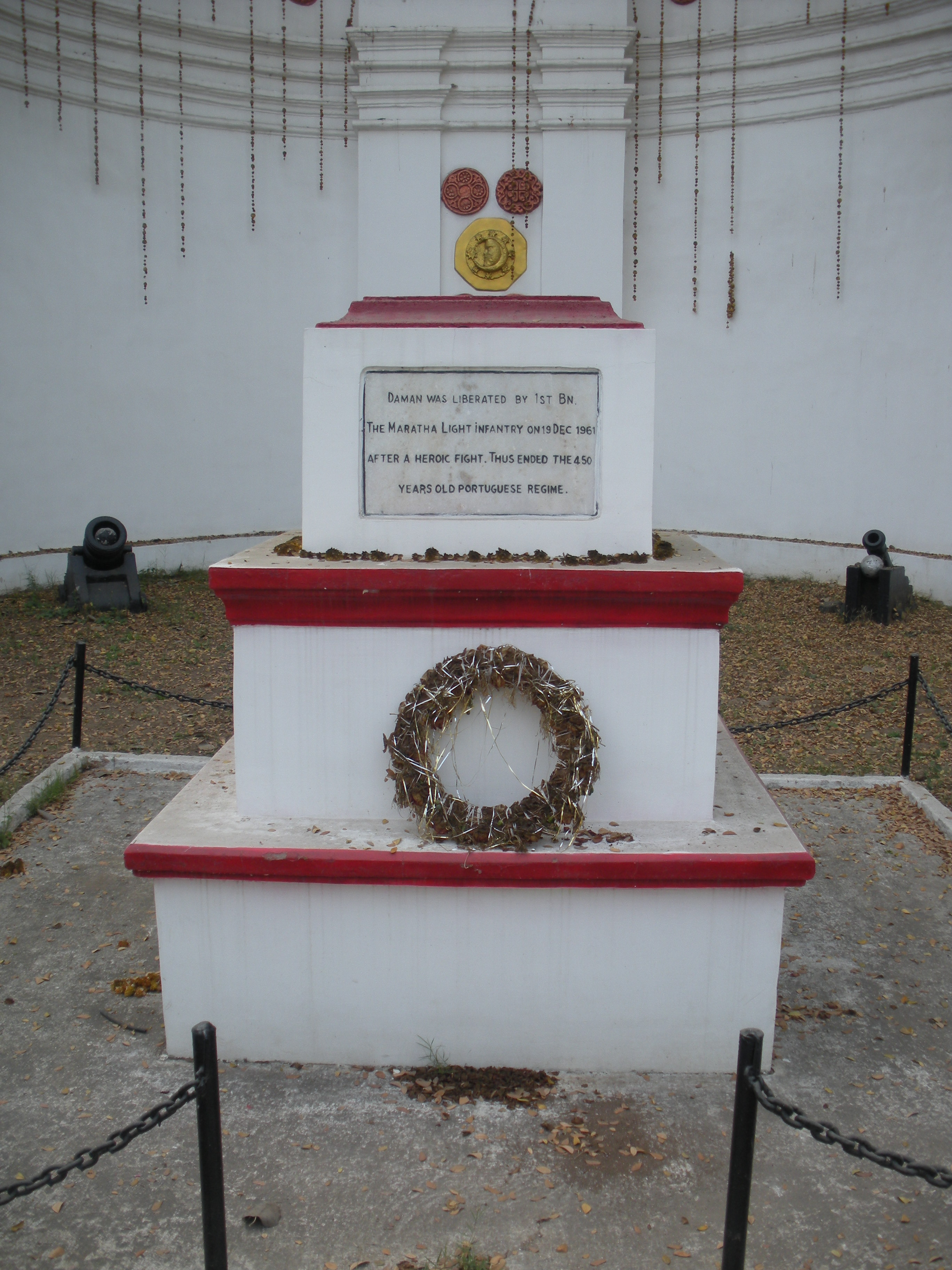
Daman Freedom Memorial

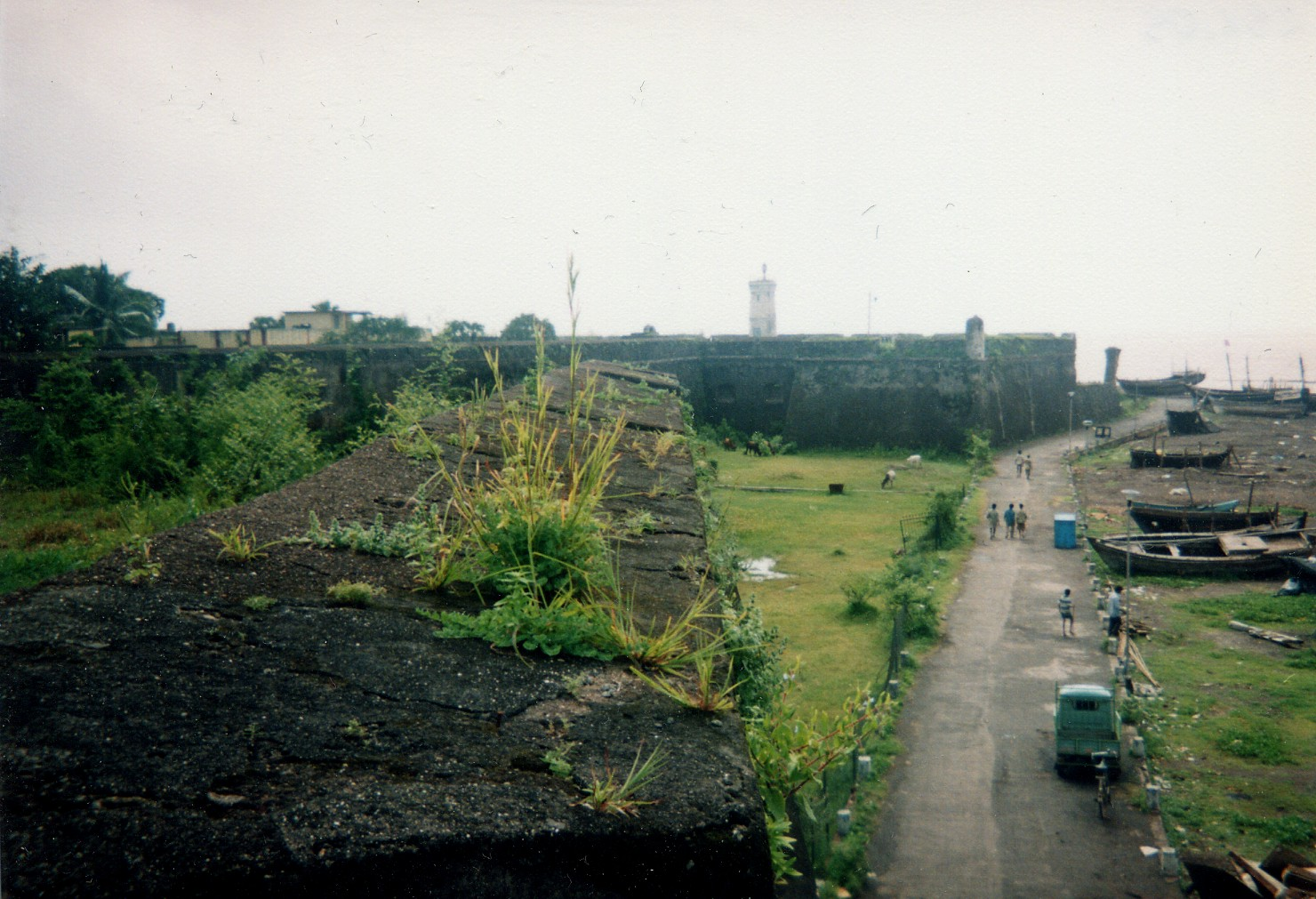
The Fort of Moti Daman

== Indian Coast Guard ==
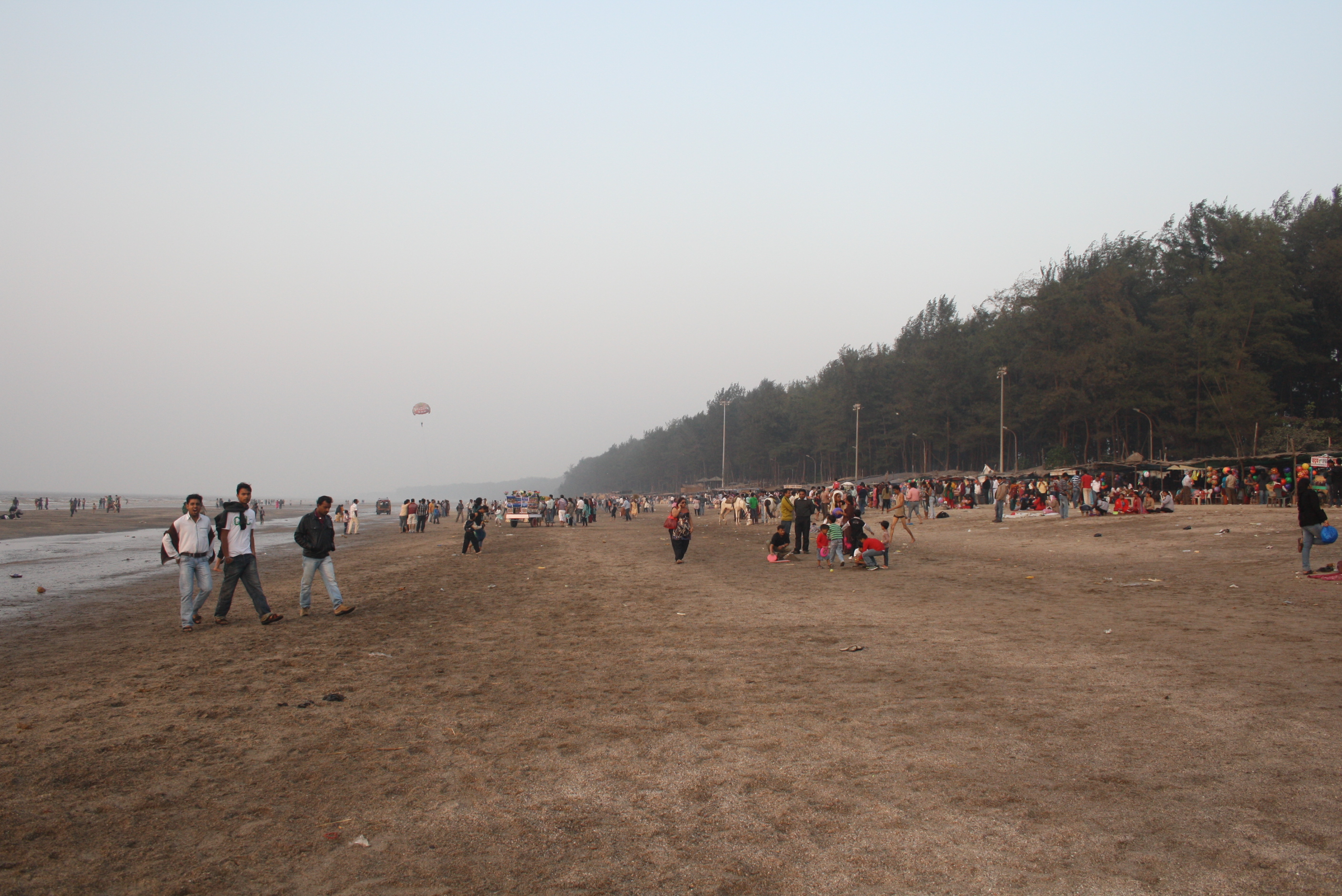
Jampore Beach in Daman

Indian Coast Guard Air Station, Daman is the premier air station of the Coast Guard with all the airfield facilities, air traffic control and other allied air traffic services. It is equipped with state-of-the-art airport surveillance radar (ASR), precision approach path indicator (PAPI), Doppler very high frequency omnidirectional radio range (DVOR) – distance measuring equipment (DME) and nondirectional beacon (NDB), as navigational aids. This air station provides ATC and parking facilities to defence as well as civil aircraft.

== Schools and colleges ==
- Coast Guard Public School, Nani Daman
- Swami Vivekanand English & Hindi Medium School, Dalwada, Daman
- Institute of Our Lady of Fatima, Convent, Moti Daman
- Podar Jumbo Kids, Daman (preschool)
- Sunrise Champs school, Mashal Chowk, Nani Daman
- Vaidik Dental college campus, Salwaar, Nani Daman
- Shrinathji School, Varkund, Nani Daman
- Divya Jyoti English High & Higher Secondary School, Dabhel, Daman
- Divya Jyoti Hindi Medium School, Dabhel, Daman
- MGM High School, Nani-Daman (Sarvajanik High School)
- Government Higher Secondary School, Nani Daman
- Government Higher Secondary School, Moti Daman
- Government Polytechnic Daman
- Shree Machchi Mahajan English Medium School, Nani Daman
- Stella Maris English Medium High School, Daman
- AIM English School, Moti Daman
- Government College, Nani Daman
- Government Primary School, Devka Mangelwad, Nani Daman
- Holy Trinity English medium high school, Dunetha, Daman
- Jawahar Navodaya Vidyalaya, Daman
