= List of wars involving Portugal =

The following is a list of wars involving Portugal.

== County of Portugal (868–1139) ==
Conflict	Combatant 1	Combatant 2	Result
Battle of Aguioncha (966 or 967) Location: River Salas, Galicia	County of Portugal	Kingdom of Galicia	Portuguese victory
Battle of Pedroso (1071) Location: Pedroso, near Braga	County of Portugal	Kingdom of Galicia	Galician victory: Portugal annexed by Galicia
Capture of Santarém (1111): Part of the Reconquista; Location: Santarém, Portugal	County of Portugal	Almoravids	Almoravid victory
Siege of Coimbra (1117): Part of the Reconquista; Location: Coimbra	County of Portugal	Almoravids	Portuguese victory
Battle of São Mamede (1128) Location: Guimarães	Theresa, Countess of Portugal	Afonso Henriques	Afonso Henriques victory
Luso–Leonese War (1130–1137): Part of Reconquista; Location: Galicia, Kingdom of Leon	County of Portugal; Kingdom of Navarre (1137)	Kingdom of Leon	Treaty of Tui
Battle of Cerneja (1139/40) Location: Cerneja (Cernesa), near Limia, Galicia	County of Portugal	Kingdom of León	Portuguese victory

== Kingdom of Portugal (1139–1910) ==
Conflict	Combatant 1	Combatant 2	Result
Battle of Ourique (1139): Part of the Portuguese Reconquista; Location: Ourique in Alentejo (southern Portugal)	County of Portugal	Almoravids	Portuguese victory
Battle of Valdevez (1140) Location: Arcos de Valdevez, Portugal	Kingdom of Portugal	Kingdom of León	Portuguese victory: Treaty of Zamora
Siege of Lisbon (1142): Part of the Portuguese Reconquista; Location: Lisbon, Portugal	Portugal; Crusaders	Almoravid dynasty	Defeat: Crusader forces failed to capture Lisbon
Second Crusade (1147–1150): Part of the Crusades and the Reconquista; Location: Iberia, Near East, Egypt	Kingdom of France; Holy Roman Empire; Byzantine Empire; Kingdom of England; Kingdom of Sicily; Kingdom of Portugal; County of Barcelona; León–Castile; Kingdom of Jerusalem; County of Tripoli; Principality of Antioch; Knights Templar	Seljuk Empire; Fatimid Caliphate; Almoravids	Status quo ante bellum: Lisbon captured by the Portuguese; Tarragona and Tortosa captured by the Catalans; See § Aftermath
Conquest of Santarém (1147): Part of the Portuguese Reconquista; Location: Santarém, Portugal	Kingdom of Portugal	Taifa of Badajoz	Portuguese victory
Siege of Lisbon (1147): Part of the Portuguese Reconquista and the Second Crusade; Location: Lisbon, Portugal	Portugal; Crusaders	Almoravid dynasty	Portuguese-Crusader victory
Luso-Leonese War (1167–1169): Siege of Badajoz (1169); Location: Iberian Peninsula	Kingdom of Portugal	Almohad Caliphate Kingdom of León	Defeat
Battle of Cape Espichel (1180): Part of the Reconquista and Almohad wars in the Iberian Peninsula; Location: Off Cape Espichel, Atlantic Ocean	Kingdom of Portugal	Almohad Caliphate	Portuguese victory
Raid of Ceuta (1180)	Kingdom of Portugal	Almohad Caliphate	Victory
Battle of Silves (1182) Location: Iberian Peninsula	Kingdom of Portugal	Almohad Caliphate	Defeat
Siege of Santarém (1184): Part of the Portuguese Reconquista and Almohad wars in the Iberian Peninsula; Location: Santarém, Portugal	Kingdom of Portugal; Kingdom of León	Almohad Caliphate	Christian victory
Almohad campaign in the Algarve (1190–1191) Location: Iberian Peninsula	Kingdom of Portugal Crusaders	Almohad Caliphate	Defeat: Part of the Reconquista and Third Crusade.
Battle of Alarcos (1195): Part of the Reconquista and Almohad wars in the Iberian Peninsula; Location: Alarcos, Ciudad Real province	Kingdom of Castile; Order of Santiago; Order of St. Benedict	Almohad Caliphate; Castilian rebels	Almohad victory
Luso-Leonese War (1196–1200) Location: Iberian Peninsula	Kingdom of Portugal Kingdom of Castile	Kingdom of León Kingdom of Navarre Almohad Caliphate	Status Quo Ante Bellum
Battle of Las Navas de Tolosa (1212): Part of the Reconquista and Almohad wars in the Iberian Peninsula; Location: Near Santa Elena, Jaén, Andalusia	Kingdom of Castile; Order of Santiago; Order of Calatrava; Crown of Aragon; Kingdom of Navarre; Knights Templar; León volunteers Portuguese volunteers; Crusaders	Almohad Caliphate	Christian victory
Siege of Alcácer do Sal (1217): Part of the Fifth Crusade, Almohad wars in the Iberian Peninsula and the Reconquista; Location: Qaṣr Abī Dānis, al-Gharb	Kingdom of Portugal; Crusaders from northern Europe	Almohad Caliphate	Portuguese–Crusader victory
Siege of Faro (1249): Part of the Portuguese Reconquista; Location: Faro, Portugal	Portugal; Order of Santiago; Order of Aviz	Taifa of Niebla	Portuguese victory
War of the Strait (1292–1350): Battle of Río Salado; Siege of Algeciras (1342–1344); (1292–1350) Location: Mediterranean Sea (Strait of Gibraltar)	Crown of Aragon Kingdom of Castile Kingdom of Portugal Supported by: Kingdom of Navarre Kingdom of France Kingdom of England Republic of Genoa	Marinid Sultanate Emirate of Granada	Victory: End of Moroccan hegemony in the Strait of Gibraltar. No more offensive or expansion attempts against the Christian Kingdoms would be done by Marinids, being just at the defensive for the rest of the reconquista.
Luso-Castilian War (1295–1297) Location: Iberian Peninsula	Kingdom of Portugal Crown of Aragon	Kingdom of Castile	Stalemate: Treaty of Alcañices
Luso-Castilian War (1336–39): Battle of Villanueva de Barcarrota (1336); Location: Iberian Peninsula	Kingdom of Portugal	Crown of Castile	Treaty of Seville (1339)
Battle of Río Salado (1340): Part of the Reconquista; Location: Iberian Peninsula	Crown of Castile; Kingdom of Portugal	Marinid Sultanate; Emirate of Granada	Castilian–Portuguese victory
Battle of Guadalmesí (1342): Part of the Reconquista; Location: Guadalmesí, Strait of Gibraltar	Crown of Castile; Kingdom of Portugal	Marinid Sultanate	Castilian–Portuguese victory
Siege of Algeciras (1342–1344): Part of the Battle of the Strait during the Reconquista; Location: Algeciras	Crown of Castile; Republic of Genoa; Kingdom of Aragon; Kingdom of Portugal; Kingdom of Navarre; European crusaders	Marinid Dynasty; Emirate of Granada	Christian victory
War of the Two Peters (1356–1369): Part of the First Castilian Civil War; Location: Mostly towns in the Kingdom of Aragon and the Kingdom of Valencia, coast of the Principality of Catalonia	Pedristas; Supported by: England; Republic of Genoa; Portugal; Navarre; Granada	Aragon; Enriquistas; Supported by: France	Trastamarian victory: Overthrow of Peter of Castile; Accession of Henry II of Castile
First Fernandine War (1369–1371): Part of the Fernandine Wars; Location: Iberian Peninsula	Ferdinand I of Portugal; Peter IV of Aragon; Charles II of Navarre	Henry of Trastámara	Treaty of Alcoutim
Second Fernandine War (1372–1373): Part of the Fernandine Wars; Location: Iberian Peninsula	Kingdom of Portugal	Crown of Castile	Defeat
Third Fernandine War (1381–1382): Part of the Fernandine Wars; Location: Iberian Peninsula	Kingdom of Portugal	Crown of Castile	Defeat
Portuguese interregnum (1383–1385): Part of the Hundred Years' War; Location: Portugal and Castile	Party of the Grandmaster of Avis; Supported by: England	Party of Beatrice of Portugal; Castile; Supported by: France; Aragon; Genoese volunteers	Victory of the Grandmaster of Avis's party: John of Avis becomes John I of Portugal, ushering in the Johanine Dynasty; Consolidation of Portuguese independence from Castile.; Signing of the Treaty of Windsor, strengthening the Anglo-Portuguese Alliance and kickstarting the so-called "Illustrious Generation"
Conquest of Ceuta (1415): Part of the Reconquista; Location: Ceuta, Marinid dynasty (part of modern-day Spain)	Kingdom of Portugal	Marinid dynasty	Portuguese victory
Siege of Ceuta (1419): Part of the Reconquista; Location: Ceuta	Kingdom of Portugal	Marinid Sultanate; Emirate of Granada	Portuguese victory
Irmandiño revolts (1431–69): Part of Castilian Civil War; Location: Iberian Peninsula	Kingdom of Castile Kingdom of Portugal Supported by: Andrade, Lemos and Moscoso families	Galician rebels	Victory
Battle of Tangier (1437): Part of the Moroccan–Portuguese conflicts; Location: Tangier, Morocco	(Kingdom of Portugal) Portuguese Empire	Marinid Sultanate	Moroccan victory
Battle of Marseille–Nice (1451) Location: Off Marseille and near Nice	(Kingdom of Portugal) Portuguese Empire	Pirates	Portuguese victory
Conquest of Ksar es-Seghir (1458): Part of the Moroccan–Portuguese conflicts; Location: Ksar es-Seghir, (modern-day Morocco)	Kingdom of Portugal	Marinid Sultanate	Portuguese victory
Catalan Civil War (1462–72): War of the Remences; Mieres uprising; Location: the Principality of Catalonia	Principality of Catalonia: Council of the Principality; Generalitat; Consell de Cent; Supported by: Crown of Castile (1462–1463); Kingdom of Portugal (1463–1466); Duchy of Lorraine (1466–1471); Kingdom of France (1466–1471)	Crown of Aragon; Supported by: Remensa; Kingdom of France (1462–1463); Crown of Castile (1469–1472)	Royal victory: Capitulation of Pedralbes
Siege of Tangier (1463–1464): Part of the Moroccan–Portuguese conflicts; Location: Tangier, Morocco	Kingdom of Portugal	Marinid Sultanate	Marinid victory
Anfa expedition (1468): Part of the Moroccan–Portuguese conflicts; Location: Anfa, Morocco	Kingdom of Portugal	Wattasid Morocco	Portuguese victory
Conquest of Asilah (1471): Part of the Moroccan–Portuguese conflicts; Location: Asilah, Morocco	Kingdom of Portugal	Wattasid Morocco	Portuguese victory: Establishment of Portuguese Asilah
Portuguese conquest of Tangier (1471): Part of the Moroccan–Portuguese conflicts; Location: Tangier, Morocco	Kingdom of Portugal	Wattasid dynasty	Portuguese victory: Establishment of Portuguese Tangier
War of the Castilian Succession (1475–1479) Location: Iberian Peninsula and Atlantic Ocean	Joanna's supporters; Kingdom of Portugal; Kingdom of France	Isabella's supporters; Crown of Aragon	Treaty of Alcáçovas: Isabella is recognised as Queen of Castile; Marriage of Isabella of Aragon to Afonso of Portugal; Portugal gains hegemony in the Atlantic south of the Canary Islands; Portugal recognizes Castile's claim to the Canary Islands
Siege of Ceuta (1476): Part of Moroccan–Portuguese conflicts; Location: North Africa	Kingdom of Portugal Crown of Castile (Juana Supporters)	Marinid Sultanate	Victory
Battle of Guinea (1478): Part of the War of the Castilian Succession; Location: Near Elmina, Gulf of Guinea	Kingdom of Portugal	Crown of Castile	Portuguese victory
Chaouia expedition (1487): Part of the Moroccan–Portuguese conflicts; Location: Chaouia, Morocco	Kingdom of Portugal	Wattasid Morocco	Portuguese victory.
Siege of Graciosa (1489): Part of Moroccan–Portuguese conflicts; Location: North Africa (Morocco)	Kingdom of Portugal: Portuguese Morocco	Wattasids	Defeat
Targa expedition (1490): Part of the Moroccan–Portuguese conflicts; Location: Targa	Kingdom of Portugal	Wattasid Morocco	Portuguese victory
First Luso-Malabarese War (1500–1513): Part of the Zamorin–Portuguese conflicts; Location: Indian Ocean, Malabar Coast, India.: First Battle of Cannanore (1501); Battle of Calicut (1503); Battle of Cochin (1504); Battle of Pandarane (1504); Battle of Cannanore (1506); Siege of Cannanore (1507); Battle of Chaul (1508); Battle of Diu (1509)	Portuguese Empire; Supported by: Kingdom of Cochin; Kingdom of Cannanore (until 1507); Kingdom of Kollam; Kingdom of Tanur (1504 on)	Kingdom of Calicut; Supported by: Mamluk Egypt; Republic of Venice; Kingdom of Tanur (up to 1504); Supported by: Mamluk Egypt; Republic of Venice; Arab privateers	Portuguese victory
Battle of Mers-el-Kébir (1501): Part of the Portuguese colonial campaigns; Location: Mers-el-Kébir, Kingdom of Tlemcen	Portuguese Empire	Kingdom of Tlemcen	Zayyanid victory
First Battle of Cannanore (1501) Location: Asia, Indian subcontinent	Portuguese Empire: 3rd Portuguese India Armada	Kingdom of Calicut	Victory
Battle of Tanger (1502) Location: North Africa (Morocco)	Portugal: Portuguese Tangier	Wattasids	Defeat
Battle of Calicut (1503) Location: Indian subcontinent	Portuguese Empire: 4th Portuguese India Armada	Kingdom of Calicut Arab privateers	Victory
Battle of Pandarane (1504) Location: Indian subcontinent	Portuguese Empire: 6th Portuguese India Armada	Mamluk Sultanate	Victory: Start of Portuguese-Mamluk Naval War
Battle of Cochin (1504) Location: Indian subcontinent	Portugal; Kingdom of Cochin	Kingdom of Calicut Vassal Malabari states: Edapalli; Cranganore; Kottakkal; Kingdom of Tanur; Beypore; Chaliyam; Pariyapuram; Other Indian States	Victory
Battle of Mombasa (1505) Location: East Africa (modern Kenya)	Portuguese Empire: 7th Portuguese India Armada	Mombasa Sultanate	Victory
Portuguese-Mamluk naval war (1505–1517): Battle of Chaul; Battle of Diu; Siege of Jeddah; Location: Asia, Indian Ocean	Portugal	Mamluk Sultanate; Kingdom of Calicut; Bijapur Sultanate; Gujarat Sultanate; Supported by Republic of Venice; Ottoman Empire	Victory: Start of Ottoman–Portuguese confrontations on the Indian Ocean.; Start of Gujarati–Portuguese conflicts on Indian subcontinent.
Siege of Anjadiva (1506) Location: Indian subcontinent	Portuguese Empire: Portuguese India	Bijapur Sultanate	Victory
Battle of Barawa (1507) Location: East Africa (modern Somalia)	Portuguese Empire	Ajuran Sultanate	Victory: Start of Ajuran-Portuguese wars
Ajuran-Portuguese wars (1507–1542) Location: East Africa (modern Somalia)	Kingdom of Portugal	Ajuran Sultanate; Ottoman Empire	Victory: Portuguese retake Pate, Mombasa and Kilwa from Somali/Ottoman forces.
Battle of Socotra (1507) Location: Socotra (between Guardafui Channel and Arabian Sea)	Portuguese Empire	Mahra Sultanate	Victory
Capture of Ormuz (1507) Location: Asia, Persian Gulf (Hormuz Island)	Portuguese Empire	Kingdom of Ormus; Safavid Empire	Victory: Start of Safavid–Portuguese conflicts
Persian–Portuguese wars (1507–1622): Capture of Cambarão; Anglo-Persian capture of Qeshm; Anglo-Persian capture of Hormuz; Location: Persian Gulf and Indian Ocean (modern Iran)	Portuguese Empire: Kingdom of Ormus; Supported by: Spanish Empire (since 1580)	Safavid Empire Omani Empire Supported by: East India Company (since 1616)	Defeat: Iranian reconquest of the territories and expel Portuguese of the Persian Gulf (except Gulf of Oman); Start of Portuguese-Omani conflicts.; The Portuguese Empire start to decline and lost most of its land in the east to the British
Siege of Cannanore (1507) Location: Indian subcontinent	Portuguese Empire: Portuguese India	Kingdom of Cannanore Kingdom of Calicut	Victory
Battle of Dabul (1508) Location: Indian subcontinent	Portuguese Empire: Portuguese India	Bijapur Sultanate	Victory
Gujarati–Portuguese conflicts (1508–1573): Battle of Chaul; Battle of Diu; Siege of Diu (1531); Siege of Diu (1538); Siege of Diu (1546); Battle of Bharuch; Portuguese conquest of Daman; Location: Indian subcontinent (Gujarat)	Portuguese Empire: Portuguese India	Gujarat Sultanate Supported by: Kingdom of Calicut Mamluk Sultanate (until 1517) Ottoman Empire (since 1517)	Victory: Establishment of Portuguese Diu.; Treaty of Bassein (1534).; Establishment of Portuguese Bassein.; Establishment of Portuguese Daman.; Consolidation of Portuguese control in the Gulf of Khambhat.; Start of Mughal-Portuguese conflicts.
Sieges of Asilah (1508–1509): Part of Moroccan–Portuguese conflicts; Location: North Africa	Kingdom of Portugal: Portuguese Asilah; Portuguese Tangier	Wattasids	Victory
Malay-Portuguese conflicts (1509–1641): Capture of Malacca (1511); Battle of Pago; Attack on Bintan (1521); Battle of Lingga; Battle of Muar River; Siege of Bintan; Battle of Ugentana; Battle of Ugentana (1536); Battle of Ugentana (1536); Siege of Malacca (1551); Siege of Johor (1587); Battle of Bantam; Siege of Malacca (1606); Battle of Cape Rachado; Location: Southeast Asia, Malay Peninsula, Straits of Malacca (modern Malaysia, Singapore and western Indonesia)	Portuguese Empire: Portuguese Malacca; Supported by: Sultanate of Perak Sultanate of Kedah	Sultanate of Malacca; Sultanate of Johor; Sultanate of Pahang; Sultanate of Patani; Sultanate of Jepara; Supported by: Sultanate of Indragiri; Dutch East India Company	Stalemate: Consolidation of Portuguese presence in Asia by conquering Sultanate of Malacca.; Then Portuguese defeat by Dutch intervention and start of Dutch Malacca.
Portuguese conquest of Goa (1510) Location: Indian subcontinent	Kingdom of Portugal: Portuguese India	Bijapur Sultanate	Victory: Consolidation of Portuguese India authority.
Capture of Malacca (1511) Location: Malacca City (modern Malaysia)	Kingdom of Portugal	Malacca Sultanate	Victory: Establishment of Portuguese Malacca and consolidation of Portuguese Empire in the Indonesian Archipelago.
Siege of Aden (1513) Location: Arabian Peninsula (modern Yemen)	Portuguese Empire: Portuguese India	Yemeni Tahirids	Defeat
Battle of Azemmour (1513): Part of Moroccan–Portuguese conflicts; Location: North Africa (Morocco)	Kingdom of Portugal: Portuguese Morocco	Wattasids	Victory: Conquest of Azemmour in Morocco
Battle of Tednest (1514): Part of Moroccan–Portuguese conflicts; Location: North Africa (Morocco)	Kingdom of Portugal: Portuguese Morocco	Saadi Sultanate	Victory
Raid of Marrakesh (1515): Part of Moroccan–Portuguese conflicts; Location: North Africa (Morocco)	Kingdom of Portugal: Portuguese Morocco; Berber auxiliaries	Hintata Supported by: Saadi Sultanate Wattasid dynasty	Defeat
Battle of Mamora (1515): Part of Moroccan–Portuguese conflicts; Location: North Africa (Morocco)	Kingdom of Portugal: Portuguese Morocco	Wattasids Supported by Abda Doukkala	Defeat
Expedition against Oulad Amrane(1516) Location: North Africa (Morocco)	Kingdom of Portugal	Oulad Amrane	Defeat
Siege of Goa (1517) Location: Indian subcontinent	Portuguese Empire: Portuguese Goa	Bijapur Sultanate	Victory
Battle of Zeila (1517) Location: East Africa (modern Somaliland)	Portuguese Empire: Portuguese India	Adal Sultanate	Victory
Sinhalese–Portuguese conflicts (1518–1658): Battle of Vedalai; Portuguese conquest of the Jaffna kingdom; Portuguese invasion of the Jaffna kingdom (1560); Portuguese invasion of the Jaffna kingdom (1591); Siege of Kotte (1557–1558); Battle of Mulleriyawa; Siege of Colombo (1587–88); Campaign of Danture; Battle of Balana; Kandyan commerce raiding against Portugal (1612–1613); Battle of Mulleriyawa (1624); Battle of Jaffna (1628); Battle of Randeniwela; Battle of Gannoruwa; Siege of Galle (1640); Action of 23 March 1654; Action of 2 May 1654; Part of Crisis of the Sixteenth Century; Location: Indian Ocean, Sri Lanka	Portuguese Empire: Portuguese India; Portuguese Ceylon; Lascarins; Kingdom of Kotte	Kingdom of Sitawaka Kingdom of Kandy Kingdom of Raigama Kingdom of Jaffna Supported by: Zamorin of Calicut Kingdom of Tanjore Vanni chieftains Dutch East India Company (From 1638)	Stalemate: Establishment and then destruction of Portuguese Ceylon, after conquering kingdoms of Kotte, Sitawaka, Jaffna and Raigama.; Capture of Colombo, Galle, Jaffna, Raigama and much of Sitawaka by the Dutch and the establishment of Dutch Ceylon
Acehnese–Portuguese conflicts (1519–1639): Battle of Aceh (1521); Pedir expedition (1522); Acehnese conquest of Pasai; Battle of Aceh (1528); Battle of Perlis River; Siege of Malacca (1568); Battle of Aceh (1569); Aceh expedition (1606); Battle of Formoso River; Battle of Langat River; Battle of Duyon River; Location: Southeast Asia, Sumatra, Malay Peninsula and Strait of Malacca (modern western Indonesia and Peninsular Malaysia)	Portuguese Empire Supported by: Kingdom of Aru; Sultanate of Johor; Sultanate of Kedah; Sultanate of Pasai; Sultanate of Pedir; Sultanate of Perak; Sultanate of Perlis	(Aceh Sultanate) Sultanate of Aceh Supported by: Ottoman Empire; Sultanate of Kalinyamat; Sultanate of Golkonda; Dutch East India Company	Inconclusive: Aceh expansionism stopped.
Portuguese conquest of Bahrain (1521) Location: Eastern Arabia, Persian Gulf (Bahrain)	Portuguese Empire: Kingdom of Ormus	Jabrids	Victory
Battle of Tunmen (1521) Location: China (modern Hong Kong)	Portuguese Empire: Tamão	Ming China	Defeat: Portuguese abandon Tamão
Battle of Sincouwaan (1522) Location: China (modern Hong Kong)	Portuguese Empire	Ming China	Defeat
Battle of al-Shihr (1523) Location: Arabian Peninsula (modern Yemen)	Portuguese Empire	Kathiri Sultanate	Victory
Siege of Calicut (1526): Part of Calicut-Portuguese wars; Location: Indian subcontinent	Portuguese Empire: Portuguese India	Zamorin of Calicut	Defeat
Battle of Mombasa (1528) Location: East Africa (modern Kenya)	Portuguese Empire Supported by: Malindi Kingdom	Mombasa Sultanate	Victory
Siege of Bahrain (1529) Location: Eastern Arabia, Persian Gulf (Bahrain)	Portuguese Empire: Kingdom of Ormus	Bahraini rebels	Defeat
Abyssinian–Adal war (1529–1543): Battle of Baçente; Battle of Jarte; Battle of the Hill of the Jews; Battle of Wofla; Battle of Wayna Daga; Location: East Africa (modern Ethiopia, Somalia, Djibouti, Eritrea)	Ethiopian Empire; Kingdom of Portugal (1542–43)	Adal Sultanate; Ottoman Empire (1542–43)	Inconclusive: Withdrawal of the Adal-Ottoman armies from the Ethiopian Highlands after the death of Ahmed ibn Ibrahim al-Ghazi.; Conflict continues between the armies of the Imperial and Amiric successors; Galawdewos and Nur ibn Mujahid.; Weakening of the Abyssinians and Adalites, which opened the door for The Great Oromo Migrations.
Spanish-Ottoman War (1529–1541): Conquest of Tunis (1535); Part of Spanish-Ottoman Wars of 1515-1577, Ottoman–Portuguese confrontations and Ottoman–Habsburg wars; Location: Mediterranean Sea, North Africa	Empire of Charles V: Spain; Kingdom of Sicily; Kingdom of Naples; Kingdom of Sardinia; Republic of Genoa; County of Flanders; Holy Roman Empire Papal States Kingdom of Portugal Knights of Malta Kingdom of France (until 1534) Hafsid dynasty Kingdom of Kuku Kabyle people	Ottoman Empire: Regency of Algiers; (Ottoman Empire) Ottoman Tunisia; Kingdom of Tlemcen Banu Rashid Arab irregulars Kingdom of France (since 1535)	Stalemate: After Habsburg forces and allies conquered the fortress of Monastir, Sousse, Hammamet and Kelibia. The Spaniards make Tunisia, under Muley Hassan of the Hafsid dynasty, a Client state.
Ternatean–Portuguese conflicts (1530–1605): Battle of Tidore; Attack on Jailolo; Location: Maluku Islands, (modern eastern Indonesia)	Portuguese Empire; Spanish Empire; Sultanate of Tidore	Sultanate of Ternate; Dutch East India Company	Defeat
Siege of Diu (1531): Part of Ottoman–Portuguese confrontations; Location: Indian subcontinent	Portuguese Empire: Portuguese India	Gujarat Sultanate Ottoman Empire	Defeat
French invasions to Colonial Brazil (1531–1615): Battle of Rio de Janeiro (1558); Battle of Rio de Janeiro (1567); Portuguese conquest of Maranhão; Battle of Guaxenduba; Location: South America, Brazil	Portuguese Empire: Colonial Brazil; Captaincy of Pernambuco; Captaincy of Rio Grande; Captaincy of Paraíba; Captaincy of São Vicente; Indian allies: Tabajara tribes; Ceará tribes; Potiguara tribes	France: (Kingdom of France) France Antarctique; (Kingdom of France) Equinoctial France; Indian allies: Tamoyo; Tupinamba	Victory: Henriville is destroyed
Spanish Jailolo-Portuguese Ternate war (1533): Part of Tidore-Ternate conflicts (1521–1667); Location: Maluku Islands, (modern eastern Indonesia)	Sultanate of Ternate (Portugal) Portuguese Empire	Sultanate of Tidore Jailolo Sultanate Spanish Empire	Stalemate
Iguape War (1534–1536) Location: South America, Brazil	Kingdom of Portugal: Colonial Brazil	Spanish Empire Indian auxiliaries: Carijós; Guaianás	Victory
Battle of Tidore (1536): Part of Ternatean Civil War and Ternatean–Portuguese conflicts; Location: Maluku Islands, (modern eastern Indonesia)	Portuguese Empire Ternate loyal to Hairun	Ternate loyal to Dayal Sultanate of Tidore Sultanate of Bacan Sultanate of Jailolo Kingdom of Vaigama Kingdom of Vaigue Kingdom of Quibibi Kingdom of Mincibo	Victory
Ottoman–Portuguese conflicts (1538–1559): Siege of Diu; Battle of Suakin (1541); Attack on Jeddah (1541); Battle of El Tor; Battle of Suez (1541); Capture of Aden (1548); Battle of Bab el-Mandeb; Siege of Qatif (1551); Action at Diu; Ottoman campaign against Hormuz (1552–1554); Battle of the Gulf of Oman; Attack on Moccha; Siege of Bahrain; Battle of Kamaran; Location: Persian Gulf, Horn of Africa, Red Sea and India	Kingdom of Portugal: Portuguese India; Kingdom of Hormuz Ethiopian Empire	Ottoman Empire; Gujarat Sultanate Adal Sultanate	Status quo ante bellum; Portugal maintains control of the Persian Gulf and the Indian Ocean; Ottomans expand their influence in the Red Sea
Shuangyu Skirmishes (1539): Part of Jiajing wokou raids; Location: China (Zhejiang)	(Japan) Wokou (Japanese, Chinese, and Korean pirates) Portuguese pirates	Ming China	Victory
Fall of Agadir (1541): Part of Moroccan–Portuguese conflicts; Location: North Africa (Morocco)	Portuguese Empire	Saadi Sultanate	Defeat
Battle of Benadir (1542) Location: East Africa (modern Somalia)	Portuguese Empire	Ajuran Sultanate	Victory
Shuangyu Skirmishes (1543): Part of Jiajing wokou raids; Location: China (Zhejiang)	(Japan) Wokou (Japanese, Chinese, and Korean pirates) Portuguese pirates	Ming China	Defeat
Burmese–Siamese War (1547–1549) Location: Southeast Asia (modern Thailand)	Ayutthaya Kingdom (Siam) Supported by: Portuguese Empire: Portuguese India	Toungoo dynasty (Burma)	Victory: Diogo Pereira and Galeote Pereira mission succeed.
Raid of Zhangzhou (1547): Part of Jiajing wokou raids; Location: China (Zhangzhou)	Portuguese pirates	Ming China	Victory
Raid of Ningbo (1548): Part of Jiajing wokou raids; Location: China (Ningbo)	Portuguese pirates	Ming China	Victory
Raid of Taizhou (1548): Part of Jiajing wokou raids; Location: China (Taizhou)	Portuguese pirates	Ming China	Victory
Battle of al-Shihr (1548) Location: Arabian Peninsula (modern Yemen)	Portuguese Empire Mahra Sultanate	Kathiri Sultanate	Victory
Incident of Dongshan Peninsula (1549): Part of Jiajing wokou raids; Location: China (Fujian)	(Japan) Wokou Portuguese merchants	Ming China	Defeat: Galeote Pereira is captured.
Battle of the Bay of Velez (1553) Location: North Africa, Peñón de Vélez de la Gomera	Kingdom of Portugal	Ottoman Empire: Regency of Algiers	Defeat
Tamoyo Confederation (1554–1567) Location: Brazil	Portuguese Empire: Colonial Brazil	Tupinambá people	Victory
Aimoré War (1555–1673) Location: Brazil	Portuguese Empire: Colonial Brazil	Aimoré people	Victory
Siege of Piratininga (1555–1736) Location: Brazil	Portuguese Empire: Colonial Brazil	Guarulho people Guaianá people Carijó people	Victory: Invaders are expelled
Siege of Kotte (1557–1558) Location: Sri Lanka	Portuguese Empire: Lascarins; Kingdom of Kotte	Kingdom of Sitawaka	Victory
Bandeirantes raids from Brazil to Spanish domains (1557–18th century) Location: South America (mostly Amazon Forest)	Portuguese Empire: Bandeirantes from Colonial Brazil	Spain: (Spain) Viceroyalty of Peru; (Spain) Viceroyalty of New Granada (since 1717); (Spain) Viceroyalty of Rio de la Plata (since 1777)	Stalemate: The Amazon is divided between Spain and Portugal with the Treaty of Madrid (1750), as both countries compromissed to stop and punish bandits expeditions from bandeirantes.
Ottoman–Portuguese conflicts (1558–1566): Part of Ottoman–Portuguese confrontations; Location: Indian Ocean	Kingdom of Portugal	Ottoman Empire; Ajuran Sultanate	Status quo ante bellum; Portugal maintains control of the Persian Gulf and the Indian Ocean; Ottomans expand their influence in the Red Sea
Battle of Mulleriyawa (1559) Location: Sri Lanka	Portuguese Empire	Kingdom of Sitawaka	Defeat: Decisive victory to Sinhalese army of Kingdom of Sitawaka
Siege of Moji (1561) Location: Asia–Pacific, Japan	Ōtomo clan Portuguese Empire	Mōri clan	Defeat
Siege of Mazagan (1562): Part of Moroccan–Portuguese conflicts; Location: North Africa (Morocco)	Portuguese Empire: Portuguese possessions in Morocco	Saadi Sultanate	Victory
Battle of Fukuda Bay (1565) Location: Asia–Pacific, Japan	Kingdom of Portugal	Matsura Takanobu Clan	Victory
Blockade of Cebu (1568): Part of Portuguese–Spanish colonial rivalry; Location: Philippines	(Portugal) Portuguese Empire: Portuguese moluccas	(Spain) Spanish Empire: (Spain) Filipino loyalists	Defeat
Battle of Aceh (1569) Location: Sumatra (modern Indonesia)	Kingdom of Portugal	(Aceh Sultanate) Sultanate of Aceh	Victory: Aceh fleet destroyed
War of the League of the Indies (1570 – 1574): Siege of Chaliyam; Location: Indian Ocean, Western India and the Straits of Malacca	Kingdom of Portugal	Sultanate of Bijapur; Sultanate of Ahmadnagar; Zamorin of Calicut (Aceh Sultanate) Sultanate of Aceh Co-belligerents: Princely states of the Kanara coast Kalinyamat Sultanate Sultanate of Ternate Sultanate of Tidore Sultanate of Golkonda Mappila Muslims	Victory
Battle of Alcácer Quibir (1578): Part of Moroccan–Portuguese conflicts; Location: North Africa (Morocco)	Kingdom of Portugal: Portuguese possessions in Morocco; Moorish Allies	Saadi Sultanate Supported by: Ottoman Empire	Defeat: 1580 Portuguese succession crisis; Rise of the Moroccan Saadi Empire
War of the Portuguese Succession (1580–1583) Location: Iberian Peninsula, Azores	Portugal loyal to Prior of Crato; France; England; United Provinces	Crown of Spain; Portugal loyal to Philip of Spain	Decisive defeat for António, Prior of Crato: Iberian Union
Ottoman–Portuguese conflicts (1580–89): Capture of Muscat (1581); Location: East Africa, Swahili coast and Indian Ocean	Kingdom of Portugal	Ottoman Empire	Victory: Portuguese control in the South East African coast restored and Mir Ali Bey captured
Mirza Muhammad Hakim's Rebellion (1575–85)Location: Central Asia	Mughal Empire Supported by: Portuguese India (since 1581)	anti-Akbar rebels	Victory: Antoni de Montserrat develops the Mongolicae Legationis Commentarius.
Siege of Daman (1581): Part of Mughal-Portuguese conflicts; Location: Indian subcontinent	Portuguese Empire: Portuguese India	Mughal Empire	Victory
Anglo-Spanish War (1585–1604): Battle of São Vicente; English Armada; Battle of Flores (1591); Battle of Flores (1592); Capture of Recife (1595); Battle of Sesimbra Bay; Location: Atlantic Ocean, Mediterranean Sea, Western Europe, Azores, Canary Islands, Ibero-America.	(Spain) Spanish Empire: (Spain) Spanish Netherlands; (Spain) Spanish American colonies; Council of Portugal; State of Brazil; Kingdom of Naples; Duchy of Parma; Grand Duchy of Tuscany; Duchy of Savoy; Duchy of Castro; (Sovereign Military Order of Malta) Order of Saint John co-belligerent: French rebels; Irish rebels	Kingdom of England (Kingdom of Ireland) Ireland co-belligerent: United Provinces; (Kingdom of France) France; (Portugal) Portuguese rebels	Indecisive: Status quo ante bellum; Treaty of London
Battle of Leitao Coast (1586) Location: Persian Gulf, Kish Island (Iran)	Portuguese Empire: Portuguese India	Arab Niquilus	Defeat
Siege of Johor (1587) Location: Malay Peninsula	Kingdom of Portugal	Johor Sultanate	Victory
Siamese–Cambodian War (1591–1594) Location: Southeast Asia (modern Cambodia)	Kingdom of Cambodia Supported by: Spanish Empire: Kingdom of Portugal	Ayutthaya Kingdom	Defeat: Satha I is destroned by siam forces. Then he sought a Spanish protectorate, starting Cambodian–Spanish War.
Cambodian–Spanish War (1593–97) Location: Southeast Asia (modern Cambodia)	Spanish Empire: Philippines; Mexican recruits; Kingdom of Portugal; Cambodian allies Japanese mercenaries	Cambodia Supported by: Ayutthaya Kingdom Johor Sultanate (Muslim Malay merchants) Kingdom of Champa (Muslim Cham merchants)	Defeat
Campaign of Danture (1594) Location: Sri Lanka	Portuguese Empire	Kingdom of Kandy	Defeat: Decisive victory to Sinhalese army of Kingdom of Kandy
Spanish-Portuguese conflict on China (1598–1600) Location: China (near Macau)	Portuguese Empire: Macau; Portuguese India	(Spain) Spanish Empire: (Spain) El Piñal; (Spain) Philippines	Victory: End of Spain's attempts to circumvent the restrictions placed on them from reaching China.; Portuguese monopoly on the 16th century China trade seizured.
Dutch–Portuguese War (1598–1663): Part of Eighty Years' War and Thirty Years' War; Europe: Battle of Cape St. Vincent (1606); Battle of the Downs; South America: Capture of Bahia; Recapture of Bahia; Battle in the Bay of San Salvador; Siege of Recife (1630); Battle of Mata Redonda; Battle of Abrolhos; Campaign of Porto Calvo; Siege of Salvador (1638); Action of 12–17 January 1640; Battle of Tabocas; Conquest of Paraíba; Insurrection of Pernambuco; Action at Tamanana, 9 September 1645; First Battle of Guararapes; Second Battle of Guararapes; Recapture of Recife (1652–1654); Africa: Siege of Mozambique (1607); Siege of Mozambique (1608); Battle of Elmina (1625); Battle of Elmina (1637); Capture of Luanda (1641); Battle of Kombi; Recapture of Angola; Asia: Battle of Bantam; Capture of Amboina; Battle of Changi (1603); Siege of Malacca (1606); Battle of Cape Rachado; Battle of Macau; Action of 1 February 1625; Battle off Hormuz (1625); Battle of Goa (1638); Action of 30 September 1639; Siege of Galle (1640); Siege of Malacca (1641); Action of 23 March 1654; Action of 2 May 1654; Dutch conquest of Malabar (1658-1663)	Kingdom of Portugal: Brazilian colonial forces; (Portugal) Portuguese Angola; (Portugal) Portuguese Mozambique; (Portugal) Portuguese Malacca; (Portugal) Portuguese India; (Portugal) Portuguese Ceylon; (Portugal) Portuguese Macau; Supported by: (Spain) Spanish Empire (until 1640); Kingdom of Cochin; Ming China; Hormuz; Potiguara Tupis	Dutch Republic: Dutch East Indies; Dutch West Indies; Dutch Brazil; Supported by: Kingdom of England (until 1640); France (until 1640); Safavid Empire; Johor Sultanate; Ternate; Ayutthaya; Kingdom of Kandy; Sitawaka; Jaffna; Kingdom of Kongo; Kingdom of Ndongo; Rio Grande Tupis Nhandui Tarairiu Tribe	Indecisive: Formation of the Dutch Empire.; Portuguese Restoration War.; Portuguese victory in Brazil, Angola, Goa and Macau.; Dutch victory in Ghana, Malacca, Sri Lanka and Indonesia.; Both sides claim victory in India.
Siege of Kottakkal (1599–1600) Location: Indian subcontinent	Portuguese Empire: Portuguese India; Kingdom of Calicut	Kunjali Marakkar forces	Victory
Palmares War (early 17th century–1695) Location: Brazil	(Portugal) Portuguese Empire: State of Brazil; Captaincy of Pernambuco; Bandeirantes	Quilombo dos Palmares	Victory
Nossa Senhora da Graça incident (1610) Location: Nagasaki, Japan	(Portugal) Portuguese Empire	Tokugawa shogunate	Defeat
Battle of Swally (1612) Location: Indian subcontinent	Portuguese Empire: Portuguese India	English East India Company	Defeat
Cummean Revolt (1617–1621) Location: Brazil	(Portugal) Portuguese Empire: State of Brazil	Tupinambá people	Victory
Sack of Madeira (1617) Location: Iberian Peninsula	Kingdom of Portugal	Ottoman Empire: Regency of Algiers	Defeat
Tupinambá Revolt (1618) Location: Brazil	(Portugal) Portuguese Empire: State of Brazil	Tupinambá people	Victory
Tupinambás Uprising (1617–1621): Cumã Revolt; Location: Brazil	Kingdom of Portugal: Brazilian colonial forces	Tupinambá rebel forces under tuxaua (cacique) Cabelo de Velha	Victory
1st Danish expedition to India (1618–1622): Roland Crappé's raids on Portuguese colonies; Conquest of Koneswaram Temple; part of Sinhalese–Portuguese conflicts and Thirty Years' War; Location: Sri Lanka	(Portugal) Portuguese Empire: (Portugal) Portuguese Ceylon; France	Denmark-Norway: (Danish India) East India Company; Kandy Supported by: Thanjavur Nayak (Dutch Republic) Dutch East India Company	Portuguese militar victory Danish political victory: Raghunatha Nayak conceded Tranquebar to the Danish East India Company; Portugal conquers Trincomalee
Sino-Dutch conflicts (1620s–1670s) Location: Asia–Pacific, China	Ming China Southern Ming dynasty Kingdom of Tungning Portuguese Empire	Dutch East India Company Chinese pirates	Victory
Capture of Ormuz (1622) Location: Persian Gulf	Kingdom of Portugal: Kingdom of Ormus; Supported by: (Spain) Spanish Empire	Safavid Empire; English East India Company	Defeat: Ormuz (which was under Portuguese control since 1507) goes back to Persian control
First Kongo-Portuguese War (1622–1623): Battle of Mbumbi; Battle of Mbanda Kasi; Location: Central Africa (modernAngola and Congo region)	Kingdom of Portugal: Portuguese Angola	Kingdom of Kongo	Status quo ante bellum: Pedro II of Kongo sought help of Dutch empire, entering to the Dutch–Portuguese War
Spanish-Siam War (1624–1636) Location: Southeast Asia (modern Thailand)	(Spain) Iberian Union: (Spain) Spanish East Indies; Council of Portugal; Macau; Goa; Malacca	Siam (Dutch Republic) Dutch East India Company	Defeat: Dutch hegemony on Southeast Asia.
Battle of Duyon River (1629) Location: Malay Peninsula	Kingdom of Portugal	(Aceh Sultanate) Sultanate of Aceh	Decisive Victory: Aceh's forces destroyed (loses 236 ships, 19,000 soldiers)
Motim das Maçarocas (1629) Location: Iberian Peninsula	(Spain) Iberian Union: Council of Portugal	(Portugal) Portuguese independentists	Victory
Mombasa war (1631–32) Location: East Africa (modern Kenya)	(Portugal) Portuguese Empire: Portuguese India	Mombasa Sultanate	Victory: Portuguese retake Fort Jesus
Siege of Hooghly (1632): Part of Mughal-Portuguese conflicts; Location: Indian subcontinent	(Portugal) Portuguese Empire: Portuguese India	Mughal Empire	Defeat
Portuguese expedition to Mombasa of 1632: Capture of Julfar (1633); Siege of Sohar (1633–1643); Part of Omani–Portuguese conflicts; Location: East Africa (modern Kenya)	(Portugal) Portuguese Empire: (Portugal) Portuguese Oman; Safavid Empire	Omani Empire	Defeat
Manuelinho Revolt (1637) Location: Iberian Peninsula	(Spain) Iberian Union: Council of Portugal	(Portugal) Portuguese independentists	Victory
Battle of Gannoruwa (1638) Location: Sri Lanka	Portuguese Empire	Kingdom of Kandy	Defeat: Sinhalese army Victory; Portuguese didn't attack Kingdom of Kandy again
Siege of Daman (1638–1639) Location: Indian subcontinent	(Portugal) Portuguese Empire: Portuguese India	Mughal Empire	Victory
Mazagan Ambush (1640): Part of Moroccan–Portuguese conflicts; Location: North Africa (Morocco)	Portuguese Empire	Republic of Salé	Defeat
Portuguese Restoration War (1640–1668): Part of Thirty Years' War and Franco-Spanish War (1635–1659); Location: Iberian Peninsula	Kingdom of Portugal: Supported by: France; (1641–59); Kingdom of England; (after 1662)	Crown of Spain (Castile and Aragon)	Victory: Treaty of Lisbon.; Charles II of Spain recognizes the sovereignty of the House of Braganza over Portugal and its colonial possessions.; Portugal cedes Ceuta to Castile.
Battle of Mbororé: Part of Portuguese Restoration War; Location: South America (modern Misiones Province, Argentina)	Portuguese Empire: Colonial Brazil; Bandeirantes; Tupi people	Spanish Empire: Peru; (Spanish Empire) Río de la Plata and Paraguay Governorate; Jesuit missions among the Guaran	Defeat
Acclamation of Amador Bueno (1641) Location: Brazil	(Portugal) Portuguese Empire: State of Brazil	Nativists	Victory: Failure in forming a kingdom; Amador Bueno swears loyalty to king John IV
Conflict between Willem Leyel and Bernt Pessart (1643–1645)Location: Indian Ocean	Leyel loyalist (Dutch East India Company) Dutch Coromandel English Madras (Portuguese Empire) Portuguese India (Carical) Supported by: Thanjavur Nayak	(Danish India) Pessart loyalist	Victory: Willem Leyel is recognized as governor of Danish India.
Dano-Carical Conflict (1644–1645)Location: India (Karaikal and Tranquebar)	(Portuguese Empire) Portuguese India (Dutch East India Company) Dutch India	Danish India	Victory
Siege of Dansborg (1644) Location: India (Tranquebar)	(Portuguese Empire) Portuguese India (Dutch East India Company) Dutch India	Danish India	Inconclusive
Siege of Muscat (1650) Location: Gulf of Oman	(Portugal) Portuguese Empire: (Portugal) Portuguese Oman	Omani Empire	Defeat: End of Portuguese rule in Oman and presence on the Persian Gulf.
Cachaça Revolt (1660–1661) Location: Brazil	(Portugal) Portuguese Empire: State of Brazil	Rio de Janeiro Rebels	Victory
Raid of Tangier (1662) Location: North Africa (Morocco)	Portuguese Empire: (Portugal) Portuguese Tangier; Supported by: Kingdom of England	Khadir Ghaïlan forces Supported by: Crown of Spain Saadi Morocco	Stalemate: Start of English occupation of Tangier.
Kongo Civil War (1665–1709): Battle of Mbwila; Battle of Mbidizi River; Battle of Kitombo; Battle of São Salvador; Location: Central Africa (modernAngola and Congo region)	(Portugal) Portuguese Empire: (Portugal) Portuguese Angola	Kingdom of Kongo Kimpanzu dynasty forces Kinlaza dynasty forces Soyo and Ngoyo Supported by: (Dutch Republic) Dutch West India Company	Stalemate: Death of King António I of Kongo.; Portugal recognizes Soyo independence by Papal Bull.; Pedro IV of Kongo, orthodox catholic, is recognized as King of Kongo.
Dutch-Zamorin Conflicts (1666–1758) Location: Indian subcontinent	Zamorin United Kingdom: (Kingdom of England) English East India Company; (Portugal) Portuguese Empire (Note: Unofficial Portuguese soldiers just helped the Zamorin.)	Dutch Republic: Dutch East India Company	Defeat
Conjuration of Our Father (1666) Location: Brazil	(Portugal) Portuguese Empire: State of Brazil	Pernambuco Rebels	Victory: Jerônimo de Mendonça Furtado removed from the post of governor; André Vidal de Negreiros appointed provisional governor
Battle of Pungo Andongo (1671) Location: Central Africa (modernAngola)	(Portugal) Portuguese Empire: (Portugal) Portuguese Angola	Kingdom of Ndongo	Victory
Battle of Katole (1681) Location: Central Africa (modernAngola)	(Portugal) Portuguese Empire: (Portugal) Portuguese Angola	Kingdom of Matamba	Pyrrhic Victory
War of the Barbarians (1683–1713) Location: Brazil	(Portugal) Portuguese Empire: State of Brazil	Confederation of the Cariris	Victory
Maratha–Portuguese War (1683–1684) Location: Indian subcontinent	(Portugal) Portuguese Empire: Portuguese India	Maratha Confederacy	Victory: Portuguese territory in India defended.
Beckman Revolt (1684) Location: Brazil	(Portugal) Portuguese Empire: State of Brazil	Maranhão Rebels	Victory
Mughal–Portuguese War (1692–1693): Part of Mughal-Portuguese conflicts; Location: Indian subcontinent	(Portugal) Portuguese Empire: Portuguese India	Mughal Empire	Victory: Portuguese territory in India defended.
Taro Revolt (1694–1695) Location: Azores	Portugal	São Jorge peasants	Victory
Battle of Daman (1694) Location: India	(Portugal) Portuguese Empire: Portuguese India	Omani Empire	Victory
Omani–Portuguese conflict (1696–1714): Siege of Mombasa (1696–1698); Battle of Surat (1704); Location: Indian Ocean, Southeast Africa, India	(Portugal) Portuguese Empire: (Portugal) Portuguese Mombasa; Portuguese India	Omani Empire	Indecisive: Omani forces capture Fort Jesus.; End of Portuguese hegemony in Southeast Africa.
War of the Spanish Succession (1701–1714) On South America: Siege of Colonia del Sacramento; Battle of Rio de Janeiro (1710); Battle of Rio de Janeiro; Cassard expedition	Spain loyal to Charles: Crown of Aragon; (Spain) Spanish Netherlands; Holy Roman Empire: Austria; Prussia (from 1702); Hanover; Great Britain (formed in 1707): England (until 1707); Scotland (until 1707); British America; British East India Company; Dutch Republic; Portugal (from 1703): State of Brazil; Savoy (Denmark) Danish Auxiliary Corps co-belligerent: Hungarian Royalists; Kingdom of Croatia	Spain loyal to Philip: Crown of Castile; Kingdom of Naples; Kingdom of Sicily; New Spain; France: New France; (Kingdom of France) French East India Company; Bavaria (until 1704) Duchy of Mantua (until 1708) Cologne (until 1702) Liège (until 1702) co-belligerent: Kuruc (Kingdom of Hungary); Principality of Transylvania	Political victory for Philip; Military victory for Charles; Treaties of Utrecht, Rastatt, and Baden: Austria, Great Britain and the Dutch Republic recognise Philip V as King of Spain but he renounces any claim to the throne of France.; Spain cedes territories in Europe.; Spain cedes the Colony of Sacramento to the Portuguese Empire
Mura War (18th century) Location: Brazil	Portugal: State of Brazil	Mura people	Victory
War of the Emboabas (1707–1709) Location: Brazil	Portugal: State of Brazil	Paulistas (Bandeirantes)	Victory: Creation of the Captaincy of São Paulo and Minas de Ouro.; São Paulo bandeirantes are expelled from Minas Gerais.
Mascate War (1710–1711) Location: Brazil	Portugal: State of Brazil; Captaincy of Pernambuco; Vila do Recife	Vila de Olinda	Victory: Reconstitution of the Pelourinho do Recife; Re-opening of the Recife Municipal Chamber
Salt Revolt (1710–1720) Location: Brazil	Portugal: State of Brazil	São Paulo Rebels	Victory
Mandu Ladino Revolt (1712–1719) Location: Brazil	Portugal: State of Brazil	Tupi people	Victory
Ottoman–Venetian War (1714–1718): Battle of Matapan; Location: Peloponnese, Aegean Sea, Ionian Islands, Dalmatia	Republic of Venice (Habsburg monarchy) Austria (from 1716); Kingdom of Portugal; Order of Malta; Papal States; Spain	Ottoman Empire	Defeat
Vila Rica Revolt (1720) Location: Brazil	Portugal: State of Brazil	Supporters of Filipe dos Santos	Victory
Manaó War (1723–1728) Location: Brazil	Portugal: State of Brazil	Manaó people	Victory
Expedition to Cabinda (1723) Location: Central Africa (modernAngola)	(Portugal) Portuguese Empire: Portuguese Angola	British Empire Kingdom of Ngoyo	Victory: Portuguese expel British from the Fort of Santa Maria de Cabinda.
Maratha–Portuguese War (1725–1726)Location: Indian subcontinent	(Portugal) Portuguese Empire: Portuguese India	Maratha Confederacy	Inconclusive: Peace of Bassein
Terço Velho Motin (1728) Location: Brazil	Portugal: State of Brazil	Terço Velho Regiment	Victory
Portuguese-Omani conflict (1728–1729) Location: Indian Ocean, Southeast Africa	(Portugal) Portuguese Empire Swahili city-states rebels against Oman	Omani Empire Swahili city-states rebels against Portugal	Statu Quo Ante Bellum: End of Portuguese presence on the Swahili coast.
Maratha–Portuguese War (1729–1732) Location: Indian subcontinent	(Portugal) Portuguese Empire: Portuguese India; Supported by: British Empire; British East India Company	Maratha Confederacy	Victory: Start of Novas Conquistas
Novas Conquistas (1729–1789): Siege of Alorna; Siege of Tiracol; Location: Indian subcontinent	(Portugal) Portuguese Empire: Portuguese India; Supported by: Rajahnate of Soonda Kingdom of Sawantwadi	Kingdom of Mysore Maratha Empire: Kolhapur State; Sawantwadi State	Victory
Spanish–Portuguese War (1735–37) Location: South America, Río de la Plata Basin (modern Uruguay)	(Portugal) Portuguese Empire: State of Brazil	(Spain) Spanish Empire: (Spain) Viceroyalty of Peru; (Spain) Governorate of the Río de la Plata	Victory: Banda Oriental in Portuguese possession
Battle of Vasai (1739) Location: Indian subcontinent	(Portugal) Portuguese Empire: Portuguese India	Maratha Confederacy	Defeat: Baçaim ceded to the Peshwas
Naval Battle of Calicut (1752) Location: Indian subcontinent	Portugal	Maratha Empire	Victory
Guaraní War (1754–56) Location: South America, Misiones Orientales (modern Paraguay, Argentina, Brazil)	Portugal: State of Brazil; Spain: (Spain) Viceroyalty of Peru; (Spain) Governorate of the Río de la Plata	Guaraní Jesuits: Jesuit missions among the Guaraní	Victory: Ratification of the Exchange Treaty.; Declaration of the border between Spain and Portugal in South America; Treaty of El Pardo.; Total abandonment of the eastern missions by the Guarani (Transfer of the Guarani out of the territories ceded to Portugal.).
Seven Years' War (1756–1763): Anglo-Spanish War (1762–63); Spanish invasion of Portugal (1762); Fantastic War; First Cevallos expedition; Mojeño War; Location: Europe, North America, West Indies, South America, West Africa, India, Philippines	Great Britain: (British Empire) British America; Prussia; Portugal (from 1762): State of Brazil; (Province of Hanover) Hanover; Brunswick-Wolfenbüttel; Hesse-Kassel; Schaumburg-Lippe Iroquois Confederacy Filipino rebels	France: New France; Austria Electorate of Saxony; Russia (until 1762); Spain (from 1762): New Spain; (Spain) Viceroyalty of Peru; Sweden (1757–62); Abenaki nation Mughal Empire (from 1757)	Victory: The Spanish invasion of Portugal (1762) was defeated; Spanish conquers Colonia del Sacramento and most of Rio Grande do Sul during the Fantastic War
First Curvelo Conspiracy (1760–1763) Location: Brazil	Portugal: State of Brazil	Conspirators	Victory
War of Galangue (1768–1769)Location: Angola	Portuguese Empire: Portuguese Angola	Galangue Kingdom	Victory: Reconquer of Fortress of Caconda
Inconfidence of Mariana (1769) Location: Brazil	Portugal: State of Brazil	Inconfidents	Victory
Siege of Mazagan (1769) Location: Morocco	Portuguese Empire	Sultanate of Morocco	Defeat: End of Moroccan–Portuguese conflicts
First Portuguese–Ovimbundu War (1774–1778) Location: Angola	Portuguese Empire: Portuguese Angola	Ovimbundu Kingdoms: Bailundo; Viye; Quingolo	Victory
Inconfidence of Sabará (1775) Location: Brazil	Portugal: State of Brazil	Inconfidents	Victory
Second Curvelo Conspiracy (1776) Location: Brazil	Portugal: State of Brazil	Conspirators	Victory
Spanish-Portuguese War (1776–1777) Location: South America, Río de la Plata Basin (modern Argentina, Uruguay and southern Brazil)	Portuguese Empire: State of Brazil	(Spain) Spanish Empire: (Spain) Viceroyalty of the Río de la Plata	Defeat: First Treaty of San Ildefonso; Portugal remains neutral during the American Revolutionary War and joins First League of Armed Neutrality
Bombardment of Algiers (1784): Part of Spanish–Algerian war (1775–1785) and Spanish-Barbary Wars (1605–1792); Location: North Africa (Algeria)	Spain; Kingdom of Naples Kingdom of Sicily (Sovereign Military Order of Malta) Order of Saint John; Portugal	Regency of Algiers	Victory
Inconfidência Mineira (1789) Location: Brazil	Portugal: State of Brazil	Inconfidents	Victory: Failed Independence of Minas Gerais.
War of the Pyrenees (1793–1795): Part of French Revolutionary Wars (War of the First Coalition); Location: Iberian Peninsula and Pyrenees	Spain; Portugal (Note: See also: Auxiliary Army to the Crown of Spain (in Portuguese)) (Kingdom of France) French Émigrés	France	Defeat
Rio de Janeiro Conjuration (1794–1795) Location: Brazil	Portugal: State of Brazil	Conjurates from Rio	Victory: Failed Independence of Rio de Janeiro
1798 Revolt of the Alfaiates (1796–1799) Location: Brazil	Portugal: State of Brazi	Conjurates from Bahia	Victory: Failed Independence of Bahia
Mediterranean campaign of 1798: Siege of Malta (1798–1800); Part of French Revolutionary Wars (War of the Second Coalition); Location: Mediterranean Sea	Great Britain Portugal Russia (Note: See also: Ushakov expedition (in Russian)): Septinsular Republic; Ottoman Empire Kingdom of Naples (Sovereign Military Order of Malta) Hospitaller Malta	France Spain	Victory
Conspiracy of the Suassunas (1800–1801) Location: Brazil	Portugal: State of Brazi	Pernambuco rebels	Victory: Failed Independence of Pernambuco
War of the Oranges (1801): Portuguese conquest of the Eastern Missions; Part of French Revolutionary Wars (War of the Second Coalition); Location: Iberian Peninsula, South America (Río de la Plata and Guiana region)	Portugal: State of Brazil	Spain: (Spain) Viceroyalty of the Río de la Plata; France: (France) French Guiana	Defeat in Europe; Victory in South America: Treaty of Badajoz; Question of Olivença; Treaty of Madrid; Territory of Brazil expanded in the south, but decrease in the north.; Portugal quits from Coalition Wars until 1807.
Invasion of Portugal (1807): Part of Napoleonic Wars; Location: Iberian Peninsula	Portugal	(France) French Empire Spain	Defeat: Start of Popular Revolts against French Occupation.
Peninsular War (1808–1814): Part of Napoleonic Wars and Campaign in south-west France (1814); Location: Iberian Peninsula and Southern France	Bourbon Spain: Cortes of Cádiz; United Kingdom; Portugal	(France) French Empire; Bonapartist Spain: Afrancesado; Duchy of Warsaw (Kingdom of Italy (Napoleonic)) Kingdom of Italy Confederation of the Rhine Swiss Confederation	Victory: Transfer of the Portuguese Court to Brazil
Portuguese conquest of French Guiana (1809): Part of Napoleonic Wars; Location: South America (The Guianas)	(Kingdom of Portugal) Portugal: Brazil; United Kingdom	(France) French Empire	Victory
Battle of the Tiger's Mouth (1809–1810) Location: China (Guangdong–Hong Kong–Macao Greater Bay Area)	Portugal	Red Flag Fleet	Victory
Portuguese invasion of the Banda Oriental (1811–1812): Part of Napoleonic Wars; Location: Río de la Plata Basin (Uruguay)	(Kingdom of Portugal) Portugal: Brazil	United Provinces of the River Plate (Spain) Viceroyalty of the Río de la Plata	Inconclusive
War of the Sixth Coalition (1813–1814): Part of Napoleonic Wars; Location: Europe	Russian Empire; Kingdom of Prussia; Austrian Empire; United Kingdom; Kingdom of Sweden (Spain) Spanish Empire; Kingdom of Portugal; Two Sicilies; Kingdom of Sardinia	First French Empire; Napoleonic Italy; Kingdom of Naples; Duchy of Warsaw (Note: Duchy of Warsaw as a state was in effect fully occupied by Russian and Prussian forces by May 1813, though most Poles remained loyal to Napoleon)	Victory Treaty of Fontainebleau, First Treaty of Paris: Bourbon Restoration; Napoleon's exile to Elba; Various territorial changes; Beginning of the Congress of Vienna; Hostilities resume with the return of Napoleon to power in 1815
War of the Seventh Coalition (1815): Part of Napoleonic Wars; Location: Europe	Russian Empire; Kingdom of Prussia; Austrian Empire; United Kingdom; Kingdom of Sweden (Spain) Spanish Empire; Kingdom of Portugal; Two Sicilies; Kingdom of Sardinia; Netherlands	First French Empire; Kingdom of Naples	Victory Second Treaty of Paris: End of Napoleonic Wars; Second exile of Napoleon and second Bourbon Restoration; Beginning of the Concert of Europe
Portuguese conquest of the Banda Oriental (1816 - 1820): Part of Argentina Civil War (War against Artigas) and Platine Wars; Location: Río de la Plata Basin (Uruguay and Argentina)	United Kingdom of Portugal, Brazil and the Algarves: Kingdom of Brazil; United Provinces of the Río de la Plata	Federal League: Entre Ríos; Misiones; Banda Oriental; Corrientes; Santa Fe; Córdoba	Victory: Annexation of the Banda Oriental to the United Kingdom of Portugal, Brazil and the Algarves.
Pernambucan Revolt (1817) Location: Brazil	United Kingdom of Portugal, Brazil and the Algarves: Kingdom of Brazil	Rebels from Pernambuco Rebels from Paraíba Rebels from Potiguares	Victory: Revolt suppressed; Dissolution of the Comarca das Alagoas in the Pernambucan territory; Failed Independence of Pernambuco
Lisbon Conspiration (1817) Location: Portugal	United Kingdom of Portugal, Brazil and the Algarves: Absolutists; Traditionalist	Supremo Conselho Regenerador de Portugal e do Algarve: Liberals; Freemasons	Victory: Revolt suppressed; Execution of Gomes Freire de Andrade.
Oporto Liberal Revolution (1820) Location: Portugal	United Kingdom of Portugal, Brazil and the Algarves: Absolutists; Traditionalist	Liberals	Defeat: Implementation of Portuguese Constitution of 1822
Martinhada Revolt (1820) Location: Portugal	Junta Provisional do Governo Supremo do Reino: Moderate liberals	Radical liberals; Traditionalists	Victory
Liberal Revolution in Bahia and Grão-Pará (1821) Location: Brazil	United Kingdom of Portugal, Brazil and the Algarves: Kingdom of Brazil	Captaincy of Bahia Captaincy of Grão-Pará	Victory: Revolt suppressed; Increase of the liberal movement in Rio de Janeiro
Constitutionalist revolt of the slaves (1821–1822) Location: Brazil	United Kingdom of Portugal, Brazil and the Algarves: Kingdom of Brazil	Minas Gerais slaves	Inconclusive: Rebels dispersed with the Proclamation of Independence
Brazilian War of Independence (1822–1825) Location: Brazil	Portugal: Brazilian loyalists	Empire of Brazil; European mercenaries	Defeat: Brazilian independence; Treaty of Rio de Janeiro
Vilafrancada (1823) Location: Portugal	Portugal	Miguelites	Victory
April Revolt (1824) Location: Portugal	Portugal	Miguelites	Victory
Liberal Wars (1828–1834): Part of Revolutions of 1830; Location: Iberian Peninsula (Portugal)	Liberal (Forces of Queen Maria II and Pedro IV) Supported by: Spain (Since 1834) United Kingdom France (Since 1830) Belgian volunteers (1832–1834)	Miguelites (Forces of King Miguel) Supported by: Spain (Until 1833) Holy Alliance Carlists	Liberal Victory: Concession of Evoramonte: Constitutional monarchy is restored; Dom Miguel renounces all his claims to the throne and goes into exile.
First Carlist War (1833–1840): Part of Carlist Wars and Revolutions of 1830; Location: Iberian Peninsula (Spain)	Carlists (Forces of Infante Carlos) Supported by: Portugal (until 1834) Holy Alliance Miguelites	Liberals (Forces of Queen Isabella II) Supported by: France; United Kingdom; Portugal (from 1834)	Liberal Victory: British mediated Convention of Vergara.
Revolta dos Calcetas (1835) Location: Portugal	Portugal	Miguelites insurgents	Victory
September Revolution (1836) Location: Portugal	Portugal	Septembrists (radical liberals)	Defeat: End of Devourism. The Constitutional Charter of 1826 is replaced by Portuguese Constitution of 1838
Marnotas Conspiracy (1837) Location: Portugal	Portugal	Miguelites insurgents	Victory
Revolt of the Marshals (1837): Chão da Feira Combat; Ruivães Combat; Location: Portugal	Portugal	Cartista insurgents	Victory
Bolama Question (1838–1870) Location: West Africa, Guinea-Bissau	Portugal: (Portugal) Portuguese Guinea	United Kingdom: Sierra Leone Colony and Protectorate	Victory: Bolama Island is annexed by Portugal.
Torres Novas Revolt (1844) Location: Portugal	Portugal	Anti-Cabralism insurgents	Victory
Patuleia (1846): Part of Revolution of Maria da Fonte; Location: Portugal	Forces of Queen Maria II: Cartista (conservative liberals); Quadruple Alliance: Spain; United Kingdom	Junta in Porto forces: Septembrists (radical liberals); Miguelites (traditionalists)	Moderate Liberal Victory: Convention of Gramido
Revolt of the Faitiões (1846) Location: China (Macau)	Portugal: (Portugal) Portuguese Macau	Chinese rebels	Victory
Baishaling Incident (1849) Location: China (Macau)	Portugal: (Portugal) Portuguese Macau	China	Victory
Guerras de Cassange (1850–62) Location: Angola	Portugal: (Portugal) Portuguese Angola	Native peoples	Victory
Guerras do Nano (1855–74) Location: Angola	Portugal: (Portugal) Portuguese Angola	Native peoples	Victory
Serpa Pinto Incident (1889) Location: Southern Africa (modern Zambia)	Portugal: (Portugal) Portuguese Mozambique	Kololo people	Inconclusive: 1890 British Ultimatum.
Anglo-Portuguese conflict on Manicaland (1890–1891) Location: Southern Africa	Portugal: (Portugal) Portuguese Mozambique; (Portugal) Portuguese Angola	United Kingdom: British Central Africa Protectorate; British South Africa Company	Defeat: Anglo-Portuguese Treaty of 1891.; Portugal got more territory in the Zambezi Valley, but ceded the Manicaland Province to British and renounce claims of Pink Map.
Second Portuguese–Ovimbundu War (1890–1904): Bailundo Revolt (1902–1904); Part of Campaigns of Pacification and Occupation; Location: Angola	Portugal: (Portugal) Portuguese Angola	Ovimbundu Kingdoms	Victory
31 January 1891 Revolt (1891) Location: Portugal	Kingdom of Portugal	Republicans	Victory
Battle of Mufilo (1907): Part of Campaigns of Pacification and Occupation; Location: Angola	Portugal: (Portugal) Portuguese Angola	Ovambo	Victory
Municipal Library Elevator Coup (1908) Location: Portugal	Kingdom of Portugal	Republicans Carbonária	Victory: Lisbon Regicide
5 October 1910 revolution (1910) Location: Portugal	Kingdom of Portugal	Republicans Carbonária	Defeat: Manuel II is exiled and flees to England.

== First Portuguese Republic (1910–1926) ==
Conflict	Combatant 1	Combatant 2	Result
East Timorese rebellion (1911–1912) Location: East Timor	Portugal	East Timorese rebels	Victory
Royalist attack on Chaves (1912) Location: Portugal and Galicia (Spain)	(Portugal) Portuguese Government	(Portugal) Royalist supporters Supported by: Spain	Victory: Henrique Mitchell de Paiva Cabral Couceiro runs to Galicia, Spain.
27 April 1913 Revolt (1913) Location: Portugal	(Portugal) Portuguese Government	Federação Radical Republicana: Radical Liberals	Victory
World War I (1914–1918): African theatre of World War I; South West Africa campaign; German campaign in Angola; Ovambo Uprising; East African campaign; Western Front (World War I); Portuguese Expeditionary Corps; Battle of the Lys (1918); Hundred Days Offensive; Location: Europe, Africa, Asia	France; United Kingdom; Russia; United States (Republic of China (1912–1949)) China; Italy; Japan; Canada; Australia; New Zealand; India; South Africa (Arab Revolt) Hejaz; Serbia; Montenegro; Romania; Belgium; Greece; Portugal; Brazil	Germany; Austria-Hungary; Ottoman Empire; Bulgaria	Victory: End of the German, Russian, Ottoman, and Austro-Hungarian empires; Formation of new countries in Europe and the Middle East; Transfer of German colonies and regions of the former Ottoman Empire to other powers; Establishment of the League of Nations
Água-Pe Revolt (1914) Location: Portugal	(Portugal) Portuguese Government	(Portugal) Royalist supporters	Victory
May 14 Revolt (1915) Location: Portugal	(Portugal) Portuguese Government	Republicans	Defeat: End of General Pimenta de Castro's government; 1915 Portuguese legislative election
December 1917 coup d'état (1917) Location: Portugal	(Portugal) Portuguese Government	Rebels led by Sidónio Pais	Defeat: Sidónio Pais establish a Military Junta; 1918 Portuguese general election
1919 Oporto Counter-Revolution (1919): Mosanto Royalist Revolt; Location: Portugal	(Portugal) Portuguese Government	(Portugal) Monarchy of the North: Royalist supporters	Victory
Bloody Night (Lisbon) (1921) Location: Portugal	(Portugal) Portuguese Government	Rioting members of the Army, Navy, and GNR soldiers	Pyrrhic Victory: 1922 Portuguese legislative election
April 18, 1925 Revolt (1925) Location: Portugal	(Portugal) Portuguese Government	Portuguese Armed Forces rebels	Victory
July 19, 1925 Revolt (1925) Location: Portugal	(Portugal) Portuguese Government	Portuguese Armed Forces rebels	Victory
28 May 1926 coup d'état (1926) Location: Portugal	(Portugal) Portuguese Government: Republican Party	Portuguese Armed Forces: (Portugal) Portuguese Army; (Portugal) Portuguese Navy	Defeat: Start of Ditadura Nacional and subsequent Estado Novo era.

== Second Portuguese Republic (1933–1974) ==
Conflict	Combatant 1	Combatant 2	Result
February 1927 Revolt (1927) Location: Portugal	Military Dictatorship: Portuguese Army; Portuguese Navy; Republican National Guard	(Portugal) February 1927 movement: Rebel units of the Portuguese Army; Rebel units of the Portuguese Navy; Rebel units of the Republican National Guard; Democratic Party; Democratic Left-wing Republican Party; General Confederation of Labour	Victory
Fifis Revolt (1927) Location: Portugal	(Portugal) Military Dictatorship	Fascists	Victory
Madeira uprising (1931) Location: Portugal	(Portugal) Military Dictatorship Supported by: United Kingdom	Paris League Republica da Atlantida: Madeira; Azores; Portuguese Guinea	Victory
August 26 Revolt (1931) Location: Portugal	(Portugal) Military Dictatorship	Buda Groups Paris League	Victory
Milk Revolt (1936) Location: Portugal	(Portugal) Estado Novo	Madeira protesters	Victory
Spanish Civil War (1936–1939) Location: Spain	(Spain) Spanish Nationalists: FET y de las JONS (Note: The only party under Francisco Franco from 1937 onward, a merger of the other factions on the Nationalist side.); FE de las JONS (Note: 1936–1937, then merged into FET y de las JONS); Requetés/CT; CEDA; Renovación Española; Army of Africa; Italy; Nazi Germany; Portugal: Viriatos	(Second Spanish Republic) Spanish Republicans: People's Army; Popular Front; UGT; CNT-FAI; Generalitat de Catalunya; Euzko Gudarostea; International Brigades; Soviet Union; Mexico	Victory: End of the Second Spanish Republic
1936 Naval Revolt (1936) Location: Portugal	(Portugal) Estado Novo	Organização Revolucionária da Armada: Portuguese Communist Party	Victory
Invasion of Timor (1942–45) [as neutral power of World War II]: Part of Pacific Theater; Location: East Timor and Indonesia	Allies: Netherlands: Dutch East Indies; United Kingdom: Australia; United States Portuguese Timor	Japan: Timorese and Javanese volunteers (Black Columns)	Status Quo Ante Bellum: Japan occupies East Timor after the end of Dutch East Indies campaign.; Withdrawal of Japanese after End of World War II in Asia.
Mealhada Revolt (1946) Location: Portugal	(Portugal) Estado Novo	Left-wing rebels	Victory
10 April 1947 Revolt (1947) Location: Portugal	(Portugal) Estado Novo	Junta de Libertação Nacional	Victory
Integration of Dadra and Nagar Haveli (1954) Location: India	Portugal	India	Defeat: Incorporation of Dadra and Nagar Haveli into India.
Viqueque rebellion (1959) Location: East Timor	Portugal	East Timorese rebels	Victory
Angolan War of Independence (1961–1974): Part of Portuguese Colonial War; Location: Angola	Portugal	MPLA; FNLA; UNITA; FLEC	Military stalemate MPLA-Coalition Political victory: Ceasefire and independence after the Carnation revolution: Alvor Agreement; Angolan independence in 1975, start of the Angolan Civil War.
Annexation of Portuguese India (1961) Location: India	Portugal	India	Defeat: Incorporation of Goa, Daman, and Diu into India.
Beja Revolt (1961–1962) Location: Portugal	(Portugal) Estado Novo	Democrat rebels	Victory
Guinea-Bissau War of Independence (1963–1974): Part of Portuguese Colonial War; Location: Guinea-Bissau	Portugal	PAIGC; Guinea (1970 only); Cuba; Non-combat support: China; Soviet Union; Senegal; Libya; Algeria; Brazil	PAIGC Political victory Military stalemate: Independence of Guinea-Bissau.
Rhodesian Bush War (1964–1979) Location: Rhodesia, Zimbabwe-Rhodesia	Rhodesia; South Africa; Portugal (1964–1974)	ZANU (Mozambique) FRELIMO; ZAPU; ANC	Stalemate: Lancaster House Agreement, internationally recognised independence for the Zimbabwe
Mozambican War of Independence (1964–1974): Part of Portuguese Colonial War Location: Mozambique	Portugal	(Mozambique) FRELIMO	Military stalemate FRELIMO Political victory: Independence of Mozambique
South African Border War (1966–1990) Location: South West Africa, Angola, Zambia	South Africa; Portugal (until 1974); UNITA; FNLA	SWAPO; SWANU; MPLA; Cuba; ANC; Zambia	Stalemate: Withdrawal of foreign forces from Angola; Namibian independence from South African rule
Caldas Insurrection (1974) Location: Portugal	(Portugal) Estado Novo	Portuguese Armed Forces rebels	Victory
Carnation Revolution (1974) Location: Portugal	(Portugal) Estado Novo	AF Movement	Defeat: Start of Portuguese transition to democracy

== Portugal (1974–present) ==
Conflict	Combatant 1	Combatant 2	Result
Insurgency in Azores and Madeira (1975–1979) Location: Portugal (Azores and Madeira Archipelagos)	Portugal	FLA FLAMA	Victory: FLA broadly gave up armed activity in 1979–1980; FLAMA dissolves itself in 1978
Bosnian War (1994–1995): NATO intervention in Bosnia and Herzegovina; Implementation Force; Stabilisation Force in Bosnia and Herzegovina; Part of the Yugoslav Wars; Location: Balkans	Bosnia and Herzegovina (Croatian Republic of Herzeg-Bosnia) Herzeg-Bosnia; Croatia United States; Belgium; Canada; Denmark; France; Germany; Italy; Luxembourg; Netherlands; Norway; Portugal; Spain; Turkey; United Kingdom	Republika Srpska; YPA; Serbian Krajina; Western Bosnia (Federal Republic of Yugoslavia) FR Yugoslavia	Victory: Dayton Accords; Internal partition of Bosnia and Herzegovina according to the Dayton Accords; Deployment of NATO-led IFOR to oversee the peace agreement; Massive civilian casualties for the Bosniak ethnic group
Kosovo War (1998–1999): Kosovo Force; Part of the Yugoslav Wars; Location: Balkans	KLA; AFRK; Albania; Croatia; United States; Belgium; Canada; Czech Republic; Denmark; France; Germany; Hungary; Italy; Luxembourg; Netherlands; Norway; Portugal; Poland; Spain; Turkey; United Kingdom	(Federal Republic of Yugoslavia) FR Yugoslavia	Victory: Kumanovo Treaty; Yugoslav security forces pull out of Kosovo; KLA veterans join the UÇPMB, starting the Preševo insurgency
Guinea-Bissau Civil War (1998–1999) Location: Guinea-Bissau	Guinea-Bissau; Senegal; Guinea; France; Portugal	Military rebels (Casamance) MFDC; United States	Defeat: Ousting of President João Bernardo Vieira; Military junta established; Malam Bacai Sanhá appointed provisional president
1999 East Timorese crisis (1999–2005): part of Decolonisation of Asia; Location: East Timor	East Timor INTERFET (United Nations) UNTAET	Pro-Indonesia militias: Aitarak; Besi Merah Putih; Laksaur; Mahidi; Supported by: Kopassus (alleged); BIN; Jakarta lobby	Victory: Independence of East Timor is secured
War in Afghanistan (2001–2014): Operation Hoover; Resolute Support Mission; Part of the war on terror; Location: Afghanistan	United States; Afghanistan; ISAF; United Kingdom; Azerbaijan; Germany; Denmark; Italy; France; Canada; Australia; New Zealand; El Salvador; Armenia; Georgia; Norway; Sweden; Poland; Estonia; Romania; Turkey; Bulgaria; Hungary; Luxembourg; Portugal; Jordan; Albania; Iceland; Northern Alliance	Taliban: Islamic Jihad Union; Haqqani network; Allied groups: HIG; al-Qaeda; IJU; IMU; Taliban splinter groups: Fidai Mahaz; 2001 invasion: Islamic Emirate of Afghanistan: Taliban; al-Qaeda: 055 Brigade	"Victory": American-led coalition invasion and occupation of Afghanistan; Destruction of al-Qaeda training camps; Fall of the Taliban government; Establishment of the Islamic Republic of Afghanistan under the Karzai administration; Start of Taliban insurgency; Death of Osama bin Laden in Pakistan; Commencement of war's 2015–2021 phase
Operation Active Endeavour (2001–2016): Part of the war on terror; Location: Mediterranean Sea	NATO Non-NATO: Georgia; Israel; Morocco; New Zealand; Russia (2006); Ukraine; Bulgaria (until 2004); Estonia (until 2004); Latvia (until 2004); Lithuania (until 2004); Romania (until 2004); Slovakia (until 2004); Slovenia (until 2004); Albania (until 2009); Croatia (until 2009)	Unspecified terrorist and smuggling groups	"Victory": Continued by Operation Sea Guardian
East Timorese crisis (2006) Location: East Timor	Australia; New Zealand; Malaysia; Portugal; East Timor	FTDL elements	Victory: Violence ends.
Operation Atalanta (2008-): Part of counter-piracy efforts off the Horn of Africa; Location: Somalia	European Union (European Union Training Mission in Somalia) Non EU: Colombia; Iceland; Liechtenstein; Montenegro; New Zealand; Norway; Serbia; Switzerland; United Kingdom	Somali pirates	Ongoing
Attack on MV Maersk Phoenix (2009): Part of counter-piracy efforts off the Horn of Africa; Location: Somalia	Portugal	Somali pirates	Victory
Central African Republic Civil War (2012-): European Union Military Operation in the Central African Republic; January 2019 Bambari clashes; 2020 N'Délé clashes; Location: Central African Republic	Central African Republic: Central African Armed Forces; MINUSCA (since 2014) Rwanda (since 2020) Russia (since 2018) Wagner Group: Russian Imperial Movement; Black Russians Formerly: South Africa (2013) MISCA (2013–2014) MICOPAX (2008–2013): Angola; Cameroon; Chad; Morocco; Uganda; Congo-Brazzaville; DRC; Gabon; Burundi; Equatorial Guinea; São Tomé and Príncipe; France (2013–2021) EUFOR RCA (2014–2015)	Coalition of Patriots for Change (since 2020): Anti-balaka; MPC; 3R; UPC; FPRC; PRNC Lord's Resistance Army Azande Ani Kpi Gbe (since March 2023) Support: Chad (alleged); (Sudan) RSF; Defunct groups: Séléka (2012–2014): CPJP; CPSK; UFDR; FDPC; FPR; RJ (2013–2018) MNLC (2017–2019) MLCJ (2008–2022) RPRC (2014–2022)	Ongoing
Mali War (2012–2023) Location: Mali	France Mali Chad Spain Poland United Kingdom Germany MINUSMA	Ansar Dine Al-Qaeda in the Islamic Maghreb ISIL Azawad	Mixed Results (end of UN mission)
Insurgency in Cabo Delgado (2017–2020): Part of the war on terror and the war against the Islamic State; Location: Mozambique	Mozambique Rwanda (from 2021) Southern African Development Community (from 2021): South Africa; Botswana; Tanzania; Lesotho; Malawi; Angola; Supported by: Russia (European Union) EUTM-Moz (from 2021) Uganda United States (from 2021) Portugal (from 2020) United Kingdom Turkey	Ansar al-Sunna Islamic State of Iraq and the Levant Supported by: Organized crime Foreign sympathizers Bandits	Ongoing

== See also ==
- Military history of Portugal
