= Battle of Daman (1694) =

1694 naval battle

- Part of the Omani–Portuguese conflicts
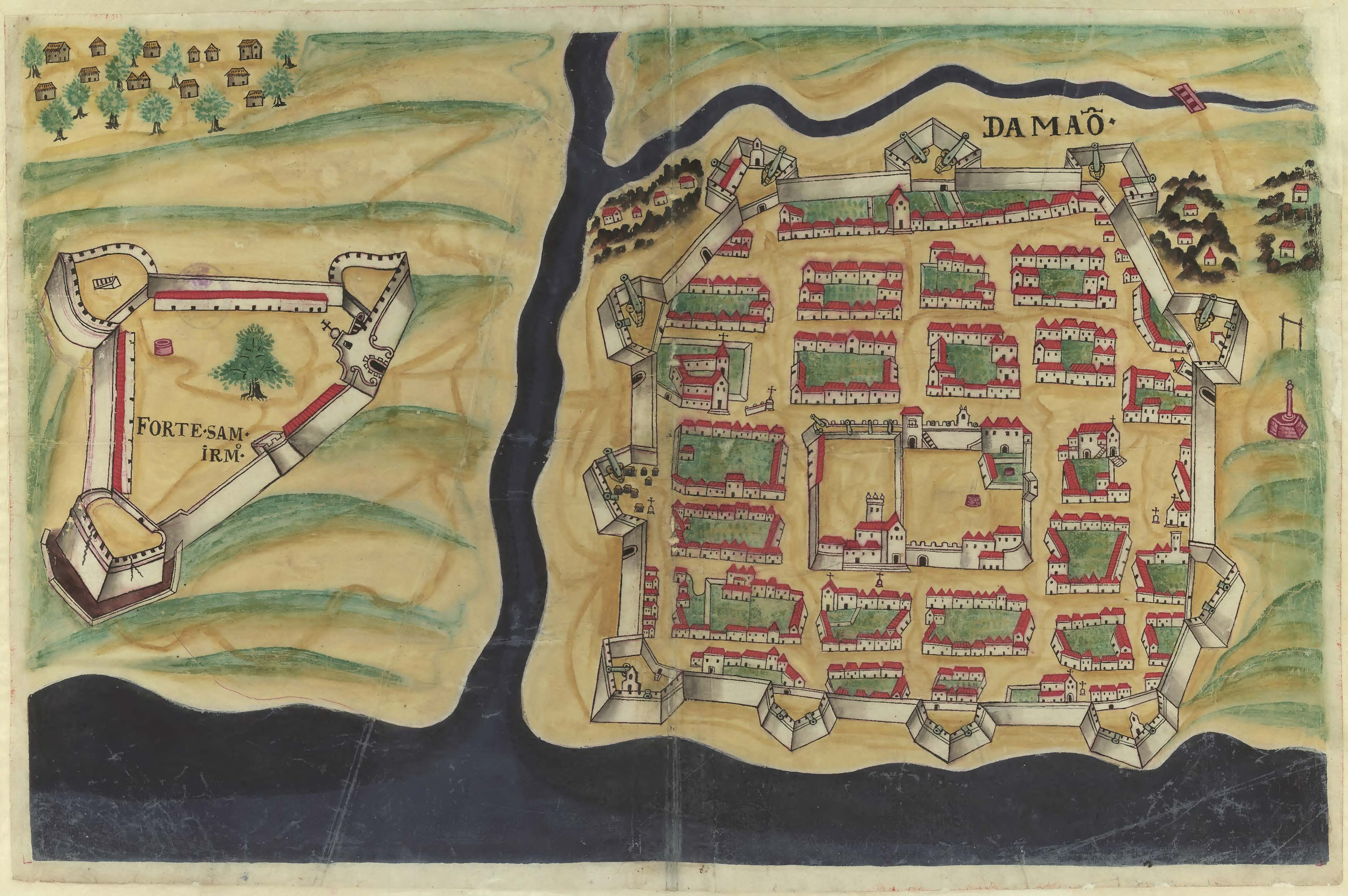
- Daman in the mid-1630s. Note that the battle took place at sea, far from the coast
Date	23 March 1694
Location	Off Daman, Arabian Sea 20.42°N 72.85°E
Result	Portuguese victory

Belligerents
Portugal	Oman

Commanders and leaders
António de Brito	Unknown

Strength
1 ship of the line 2 frigates 1 galiot	8 ships of the line 6 frigates

Casualties and losses
Light	1 ship of the line damaged (Note: This ship of the line sunk in the following day as a consequence of the severe damage it suffered during the battle.); 3 frigates sunk 600 killed

The Battle of Daman took place on 23 March 1694, when a Portuguese squadron, commanded by General António Machado de Brito, pursued and attacked an Omani squadron sailing off Daman.

== Background ==
In January 1694, an Omani squadron of eight ships of the line and six frigates attacked Salsette Island, sacking some of its villages.

In February, after having knowledge of the Omani presence in the coast, the Viceroy of India, the Count of Vila Verde, organized, in Goa, a squadron of one ship of the line, two frigates and one galiot, commanded by Captain Pereira da Silva. The Viceroy had nominated General António Machado de Brito for the command of the squadron, who was at Bassein at the time, which is why he only embarked during the passage through this town. Supposing that the Omani squadron, after attacking and sacking Salsette Island, had sailed to Surat, General António Machado de Brito departed for there.

== Battle ==
In the morning of 23 March, the Portuguese squadron was sailing off Daman, when they sighted the Omani squadron, who were also sailing to the north, but next to the coast.

With the land breeze still blowing, it is probably that the Portuguese squadron started sailing close-hauled to approach the Omani squadron. At approximately 11:00 a.m. the Portuguese squadron had reached their shooting range of the rear of the line of battle of the Omani squadron, establishing a vigorous artillery duel with the rear. In response, the vanguard of the Omani squadron should be starting wearing ship to help the rear, but, it seems they did not, possibly because they did not had time before the wind fell. During this period it's supposed that the Portuguese squadron, with the advantage of having a galiot, had continued bombarding intensively the Omani vessels that were close to each other, causing them a lot of damage to the hull and to the rigging, and also causing them numerous killed and wounded.

When the sea breeze started blowing, it is natural that both squadrons started to sail to the open sea, with the bow to the west-southwest and on a starboard tack, the majority of the Omani squadron having the advantage of being upwind of the Portuguese squadron. In this period it's probably that the artillery duel was fought exclusively between the Portuguese squadron and the rear of the Omani squadron that, apparently, wasn't able to take advantage of their overwhelming advantage. And, again, the Portuguese gunners, who had more experience than the Omani gunners, provoked considerable damage and casualties in the Omani squadron.

In the afternoon it is possible that both squadrons started wearing ship and returned to the coast. In the evening, the lack of ammunition made them separate and anchor, to fix the damage suffered and take care of the wounded. In the night, the Omani squadron, completely demoralized, weighed anchor, and, enjoying the land breeze, sailed to the open sea, towards Muscat.

== Aftermath ==
The Omani squadron lost three frigates, sunk by artillery fire, which shows the bad quality of their construction, and had about 600 killed. In the following day they lost a ship of the line, which sunk by result of the damage that it suffered during the battle.

Having more robust vessels and better artillery than the Omani squadron, the Portuguese squadron suffered relatively light damage and casualties. In April, having left the coast clean, the Portuguese squadron returned to Goa.

== See also ==
- Siege of Sohar (1633–1643)
- Siege of Mombasa (1696–1698)
- Battle of Surat (1704)
