= Persian Gulf campaign (1719) =

- Part of Omani–Portuguese conflicts
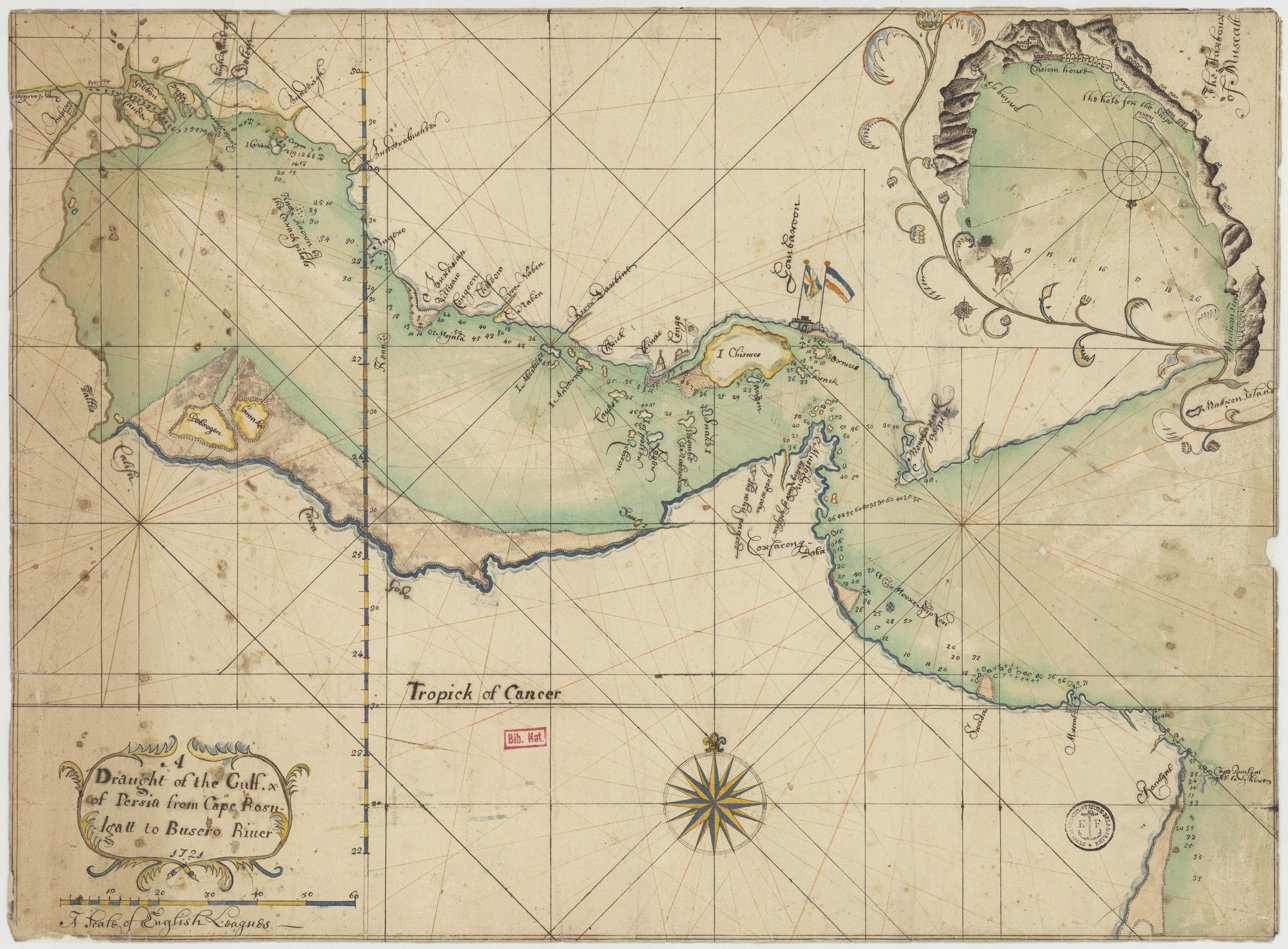
- 1721 map of the Persian Gulf
Date	5–30 August 1719
Location	Persian Gulf
Result	Portuguese victory

Belligerents
Kingdom of Portugal; Safavid Iran	Imamate of Oman

Commanders and leaders
António de Figueiredo e Utra	Unnamed admiral

Casualties and losses
Unknown	1,400 dead

The Persian Gulf campaign (1719) consisted of two or three naval battles in the Persian Gulf in which the Kingdom of Portugal assisted Safavid Iran against the Imamate of Oman.
