= Siege of Mombasa (1696–1698) =

1698 siege

- Part of the Omani–Portuguese conflicts
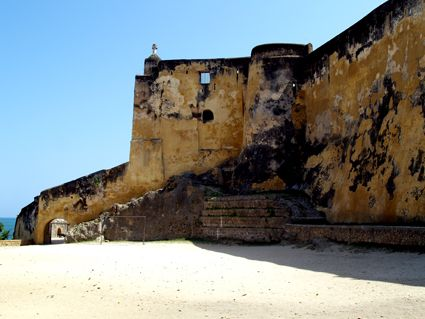
- Fort Jesus
Date	13 March 1696 – 13 December 1698
Location	Mombasa, present-day Mombasa County, Kenya
Result	Omani victory

Belligerents
(Kingdom of Portugal) Portuguese Empire	Omani Empire

Commanders and leaders
(Kingdom of Portugal) Fatuma	Saif I bin Sultan

The siege of Mombasa was an attack on the Portuguese city of Mombasa and Fort Jesus by the army of the Ya'rubid ruler of Oman, Saif I bin Sultan, from 13 March 1696 to 13 December 1698.

== Siege ==
The Yarubid dynasty had been expanding since the expulsion of the Portuguese Army from Oman in 1650. They attacked Portuguese possessions in East Africa and engaged in slave trade. In 1660 they attacked Mombasa for the first time, sacking the city, but could not capture the fort.

When the Omanis surrounded Fort Jesus in 1696 the garrison consisted of between 50 and 70 Portuguese soldiers and several hundred loyal African slaves. Hunger and disease thinned the garrison and the civilian population who had taken refuge in the fort. Queen Fatuma of Zanzibar sent three dhows full of supplies to the fort, however the dhows were captured and burned by the Omanis, forcing Fatuma to flee to the interior of the Island. No reinforcements arrived from the Portuguese until the siege was lifted in December 1696, when the Omani forces captured Fort Jesus and installed an Omani governor, then attacked Zanzibar, drove out the last Portuguese settlers, and captured Queen Fatuma. Fatuma was taken to Oman and remained there in exile for the next 12 years. While she was away, her son Hassan took the title of Mwinyi Mkuu but pledged allegiance to Oman and paid tribute. She was allowed to return to rule Unguja in 1709 as a vassal and client state of Oman for the rest of her reign.

Soon the Omanis returned and disease killed all the Portuguese soldiers. The defense was left in the hands of Sheikh Daud of Faza with seventeen of his family members, 8 African men and 50 African women. Portuguese reinforcements arrived again on September 15 and December 1697. After another year of siege, in December 1698, the garrison comprised only the Captain, nine men and a priest. The last Omani attack on December 13 captured the fort. Just seven days after its capture a Portuguese relief fleet arrived to see the fort lost. The siege had lasted almost three years. Mombasa would remain in Omani hands until 1728. With this successful siege, the whole coast of Kenya and Tanzania with Zanzibar and Pemba fell to the Omani Arabs.

== Aftermath ==
The news of the siege only reached Lisbon in the end of 1698, at the same time that the city surrendered. Alarmed, King Peter II of Portugal immediately ordered to organize a relief squadron, which was constituted by two ships of the line and three frigates, with a terço of 950 soldiers embarked. The squadron sailed from the Tagus River on 25 March 1699, arriving in Mozambique Island on 15 July, where it was known that the city had surrendered months ago. The squadron then sailed to Zanzibar Island, with the intention of putting pilots that conducted them to Mombasa, but after failing in getting pilots, the captain-major of the squadron, Henrique Jacques de Magalhães, sailed to Goa, arriving there in September with 300 soldiers less, due to disease, and with the remaining sick. The news of the surrender of the city only reached Lisbon on 26 March 1700. However, King Peter II of Portugal did not give up, and he ordered to send another squadrons in 1700 and 1701. Both failed, due, again, to disease within the troops.

In 1701, the Viceroy of India, António Luís Gonçalves da Câmara Coutinho, organised a squadron constituted of one ship of the line, two frigates and by the Strait Squadron (did not arrive), which failed again due to a storm at the Mandovi River, that made the three ships sunk. At the same time King Charles II of Spain died, postponing the recuperation of Mombasa to sine die. Animated by their success of conquering Mombasa and with the incapacity showed by the Portuguese for its recuperation, the Omani started to attack Portuguese cities, capturing Pemba Island, Kilwa Island and attacking Mozambique Island and Salsette Island.

== See also ==
- Siege of Sohar (1633–1643)
- Capture of Muscat (1650)
- Battle of Daman (1694)
- Battle of Surat (1704)
