= Fatuma binti Yusuf al-Alawi =

- Queen of Unguja
- Born: c. 1650
- Died: 1715 (aged 64–65)
- Abdullah
- Issue: Hasan

Fatuma binti Yusuf al-Alawi (c. 1650 – 1715) was a queen of Unguja in pre-Sultanate Zanzibar. A supporter of the Portuguese in their war against Oman, she sent supplies to the Europeans at the Siege of Fort Jesus. She was captured during the subsequent Omani occupation of Zanzibar and exiled to Oman. Allowed to return in 1709 she ruled the island as a client state of Oman for the rest of her life.

== Life ==
Fatuma binti Yusuf al-Alawi (also called Fatima) was born in about 1650. She was of Sayyid descent and her ancestors were from Hadhramaut, Yemen but she claimed Persian ancestry as well. The daughter of King Yusuf of Zanzibar her father's territory of Unguja was split into two, a southern kingdom ruled by her brother Bakari bin Yusuf from Kizimkazi and a northern kingdom ruled by Fatuma from the site of modern-day Zanzibar City.

Fatuma married her cousin Abdullah, King of the Utondwe, a Swahili kingdom on the African coast opposite Zanzibar. They had a son, Hasan.

Queen Fatuma ruled in a period of transition in East Africa from the colonial Portuguese to the rising power of Oman. Fatuma remained loyal to the Portuguese, attempting to resupply Fort Jesus, in Mombasa (modern Kenya) before its fall to the Omanis in the 1696–98 siege. The three dhows of food she sent were captured and burnt by Omani forces. Another account states that she sent ships to fight the Omani vessels. Fatuma was also said to have travelled to Portuguese Goa to seek reinforcements for the beleaguered garrison.

Zanzibar was subsequently raided by the Omanis who destroyed the Portuguese settlement there and constructed the Old Fort of Zanzibar on the site of the Portuguese chapel and the house of a merchant.

Fatuma and Hasan were taken prisoner and sent into exile in Oman. They were allowed to return in 1709 and Fatuma ruled Zanzibar as a client state of Oman from her palace, on the site of the House of Wonders (the palace of the later Sultanate of Zanzibar). The Omanis kept one of the three cannons in the Old Fort trained on Fatuma's palace to enforce her compliance and prevent her from communicating with the Portuguese in Mozambique. Fatuma died in 1715 and was buried in a family plot to the immediate south of the fort. Fatuma was succeeded by Hasan. Her grandson, Hasan's son, was the penultimate independent ruler of Zanzibar before the establishment of the Omani Sultanate.
