= Moscoso =

Moscoso is a Galician surname most prominently held in the Andean nations of Peru, Ecuador, Bolivia and Colombia. It is also common in Guatemala and Chile. Within Spain, the surname is most common in Andalusia, having arrived there with Galicians during the reconquest. Etymologically, this surname comes from Latin muscōsum, accusative singular of muscōsus, meaning mossy...Alternatively, from mosca ("fly") + -oso ("place with"). However, there are few, if any examples, in which Latin word-final "a" becomes "o", making this latter etymology unlikely."

== People with the name ==
- Javier Moscoso del Prado y Muñoz (1934–2025), Spanish politician
- Juan de Moscoso (d. 1663), Chilean Jesuit missionary
- Juan Manuel Moscoso y Peralta (1723–1811), Bishop of Córdoba and Cusco and Archbishop of Granada (Spain)
- Juan Pío Camilo de Tristán y Moscoso (1773–1860), Peruvian general and politician
- Guillermo Moscoso (born 1983), former MLB baseball pitcher
- Gustavo Moscoso (born 1955), Chilean soccer player
- Hugo González Moscoso (1922–2010), one of the leaders of Revolutionary Workers' Party in Bolivia
- Juan Carlos Moscoso (born 1982), Salvadorean soccer player
- Luis de Moscoso Alvarado (1505–1551), Spanish explorer
- Luis Moscoso (born 1950), Washington state representative
- Mireya Moscoso (born 1946), former president of Panama
- Piedad Moscoso (1932–2010), Ecuadorian educator, physician, and activist
- Teodoro Moscoso (1910–1992), Puerto Rican politician
- Victor Moscoso (born 1936), American illustrator and comic book artist
- Victor Emilio Moscoso Cárdenas (1846-1897), Ecuadorian Jesuit martyr and philosopher

== Businesses ==
- Farmacias Moscoso, a Puerto Rican former pharmacy chain

== Other uses ==
- Moscoso, in Spain is informal name of a "day of private affairs" – a day of unpaid leave for certain groups of workers and officials. Named after the minister Javier Moscoso, who signed this right for civil servants.
