= Battle of Surat (1704) =

1704 naval battle

- Part of the Omani–Portuguese conflicts
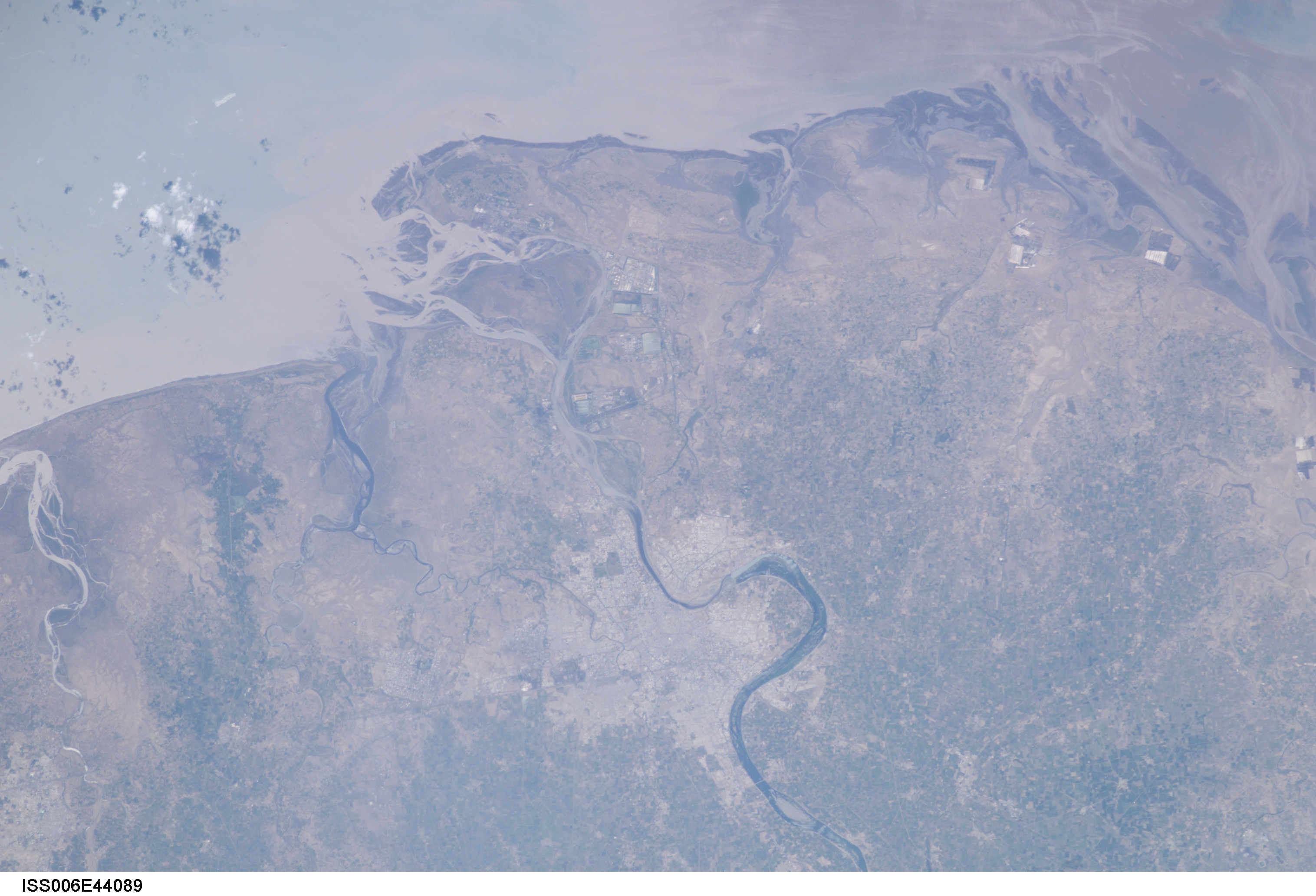
- The battle took place at the deepest point of the river delta, near Surat (north-west of the image)
Date	2 February 1704
Location	Off Surat, Arabian Sea 21°4′2″N 72°39′46″E
Result	Portuguese victory

Belligerents
(Kingdom of Portugal) Portugal	Oman

Commanders and leaders
(Kingdom of Portugal) D. António de Meneses (Kingdom of Portugal) Diogo Tavares da Gama (Kingdom of Portugal) Jorge de Sousa de Meneses	Unnamed admiral †

Strength
1 ship of the line 7 frigates	9 ships of the line and frigates

Casualties and losses
1 frigate damaged 40, 90 or 100 killed 30–150 wounded	2 frigates captured 700 killed

The Battle of Surat took place on 2 February 1704, off Surat, India, Arabian Sea, when a Portuguese squadron of one ship of the line and seven frigates, commanded by D. António de Meneses, defeated an Omani squadron of nine ships of the line and frigates.

== Background ==
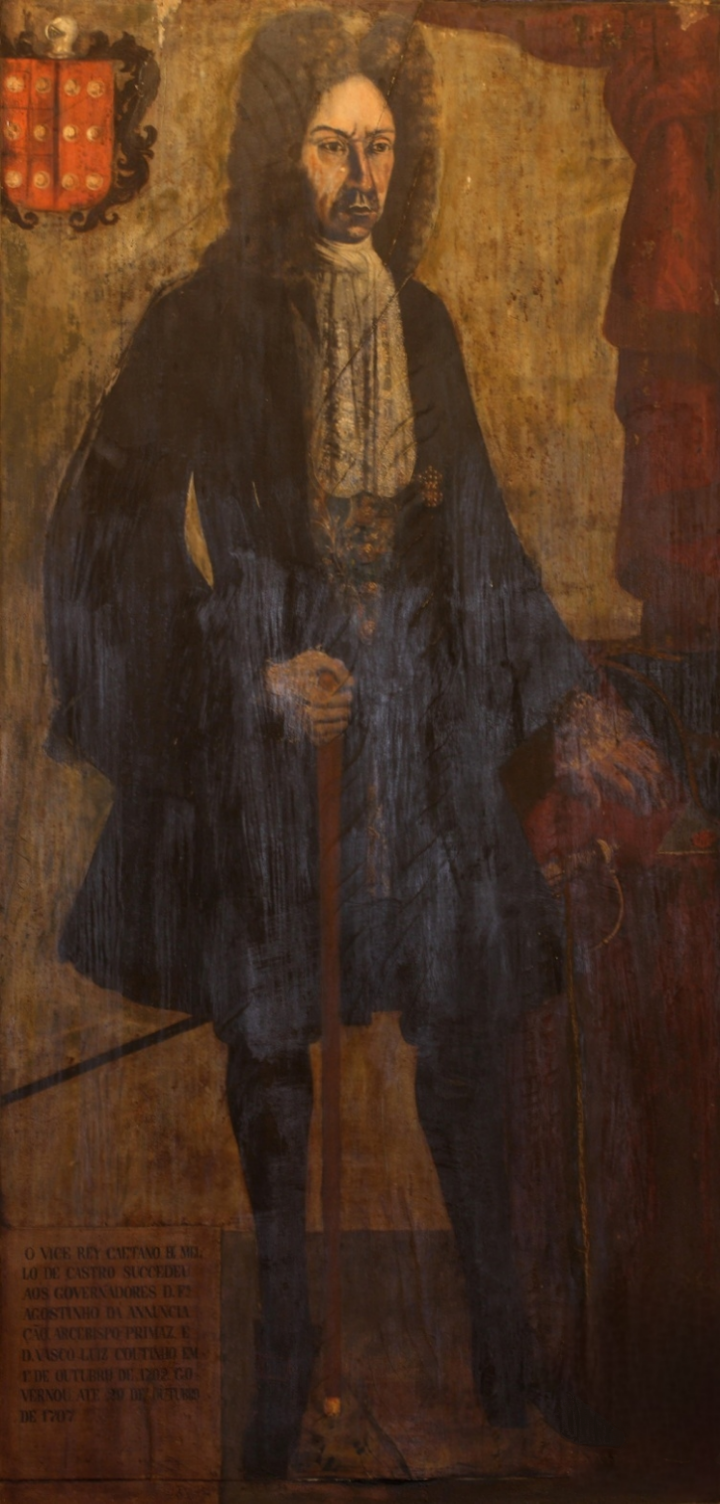
Portrait of Viceroy Caetano de Melo e Castro

In September 1703, the Omanis returned to the Indian coast with a squadron of five ships, and pillaged the outskirts of Daman during seven days. When the news of the sack reached Goa, the Viceroy of India, Caetano de Melo e Castro, quickly organized a squadron of four frigates, commanded by captain of sea and war Jorge de Sousa de Meneses. However, shortly after the departure of the Portuguese squadron, news reached Goa that the Omani had received reinforcements and their squadron was now composed by nine ships of the line and frigates, accompanied by a certain number of terradas, whose garrison was composed by 3,000 soldiers. Fearing that the four frigates of Sousa de Meneses wouldn't be sufficient to face a so powerful enemy, the Viceroy decided to reinforce the squadron with two frigates, that sailed to the north commanded by D. António de Meneses. Not satisfied, yet, the Viceroy still reinforced, on 30 December, the squadron with the 60-gun ship of the line Nossa Senhora da Glória and another frigate.

Thanks to the diligence of the Viceroy, now the Portuguese squadron was composed by one ship of the line and seven frigates, assisted by twelve rowing ships that constituted the Northern Squadron, in charge of escorting merchant caravans.

After the sack of Daman, the Omani had sailed to Surat, having stayed with the high board anchored at the poço (lit. 'deep', meaning the deepest part of Surat river's mouth) and having sent the terradas to near the city. Sousa de Meneses stayed outside the poço, limiting himself to watch the enemy while waiting the arrival of the reinforcements whose he knew it was being prepared in Goa. As soon as they arrived, they decided to attack.

== Battle ==
On 2 February, at 2:00 p.m., enjoying the high tide, the Portuguese squadron crossed the shoal that separated the exterior anchorage from the poço, having anchoring in the interior of it and having stayed with the ships next to and in a short distance with one of the Omani ships. Then a violent artillery duel started, and it lasted until the sunset.

At 4:00 p.m., by accident or by the action of the enemy, the frigate Nossa Senhora da Batalha started to catch fire. The frigate Nossa Senhora do Vale helped she, extinguishing the fire.

By result of the sure shot of the Portuguese artillery and musketry, the Omani suffered a lot of damage and casualties. The 80-gun flagship of the Omani squadron and a 50-gun, both ships of the line, in the attempt of move away from the Portuguese ships, ran aground, shortly after two frigates ran aground too.

At 6:00 p.m. the Omani squadron was completely destroyed and their captains thought of nothing else but move away from the Portuguese ships. By the night the fighting ended.

On 3 February, at 1:00 a.m., with high tide, the two Omani ships of the line that had run aground managed to leave and silently abandoned the poço, and sailed towards Muscat, like all the Omani squadron, except the two frigates that couldn't leave.

By the sunrise of 3 February, both frigates were captured by the Portuguese, one could leave and was incorporated in the Portuguese Navy, christened as São Caetano, and the other was burned.

== Aftermath ==
Together with the two frigates lost, the Omani suffered heavy casualties, 700 dead and a lot of wounded. The Portuguese suffered 90 dead, the most were victims of the fire of the frigate Nossa Senhora da Batalha, and 30 and 150 wounded.

When notifying the victory in a letter to King Pedro II, the Viceroy said that "[...] it was one of the fiercest clashes seen in India for many years [...]" and that "[...] it was fought in full view of the English, the Dutch, and the same Mughals who valued the Arabs for the most valiant soldiers in Asia and feared them and respected [...]"

According to Portuguese Navy historian, Commander Armando da Silva Saturnino Monteiro, "it is to be assumed that as a result of the victory achieved, the Portuguese prestige in India has risen considerably, canceling out in some measure the bad impression caused by the loss of Mombasa in 1698."

After the battle the Portuguese squadron stayed anchored in the poço of Surat until April, in order to prevent that the Omani terradas anchored in Surat sailed to Oman. At the approaching of the monsoon, the squadron left.

Ten years later, on 19 February 1714, another naval battle between Portugal and Oman was fought off Surat, this time it ended with an indecisive strategic outcome, but with a Portuguese tactical victory.
