= Battle of Pandarane =

- Part of First Luso-Malabarese War
| Date | Autumn of 1504 |
| Location | Pandarane, India |
| Result | Portuguese victory |

Belligerents
| Portuguese Empire | Mamluk Empire |

Commanders and leaders
| Lopo Soares de Albergaria | Unknown |

Strength
| 2 caravels 15 little boats 360 men | 17 large carracks 4,000 men |

Casualties and losses
| 23 men killed 170 men wounded | All ships captured or destroyed 2,000 men killed or captured 130 artillery pieces captured |

The Battle of Pandarane was a naval engagement between the Portuguese forces commanded by Lopo Soares de Albergaria, a Portuguese commander, and a large fleet of then Mamluk Sultan. The Portuguese were victorious.
