= Sefer Reis =

Turkish privateer and Ottoman admiral

- Born: Unknown
- Died: 1565 Aden, Yemen
- Allegiance: Ottoman Empire
- Branch: Ottoman Navy
- Conflicts: Battle of Bab al-Mandab; Action at Diu; Attack on Mocha; Battle of Kamaran

Sefer Reis (Ottoman Turkish: سفر رئيس; died 1565) was an Ottoman admiral and privateer who was active against the Portuguese in the Indian Ocean in the 16th century.

== Life ==
There is almost nothing known about Sefer Reis' origin and family background. The strategy of Sefer Reis was different from that of his predecessors in that he never tried to storm a fortress, transport troops or land siege equipment. From hard years of experience, he knew that the strength as well as the weakness of the Portuguese lay in the sea, and he concentrated his operations on Portuguese ships so that his victories were not measured in hectares of conquered territory, but in captured vessels and increased custom revenues in Mocha, Jiddah and Suez.

=== Battle of Bab el-Mandeb ===
The aim was to launch a counter-attack against the Ottoman corsair Sefer Reis however the Portuguese were defeated and the commander Luiz Figueira was killed.

Upon hearing rumours of preparations at Suez in 1550 the Portuguese dispatched an expedition to the Red Sea under Luiz Figueira. A large Portuguese squadron commanded by Luiz Figueira spotted four large Ottoman galliots and with them Sefer Reis who had the intention of sacking Muscat and raiding the ships that leave from Hormuz to Goa and other Indian coastal ports. Luiz Figueira had the aim of launching a counter-attack against Sefer Reis. Sefer Reis turned back and headed in the direction from which he had come, moving fast and avoiding an open sea confrontation with the more heavily armed Portuguese forces. Figueira attempted to give chase but realised that the Ottoman galleys were too fast. Luiz Figueira stopped his pursuit of Sefer Reis and set course for India to report his observations to his superiors. Once Figueira had made his report the Portuguese viceroy Afonso de Noronha rearmed his fleet and ordered Figueira to sail directly to the Red Sea, make a punitive counterattack and destroy the galleys of Sefer Reis.

Figueira and the Portuguese forces, composed of four sailing ships and one oared fusta arrived at Bab al-Mandab in January 1551. Sefer Reis had expected his arrival and was waiting in a carefully chosen location. The Portuguese squadron soon caught sight of the four galliots of Sefer Reis and Figueira recklessly engaged all four enemy vessels with his own oared fusta, however he quickly found himself surrounded. His escort of sailing ships made an attempt to move in to help him but realised that it was too late, as a result they were unable to do anything but fire an ineffective barrage of artillery from a distance. The fusta of Figueira was overrun, Figueira was killed and all of his men were taken captive forcing the remaining Portuguese ships to flee in disgrace.

=== Action at Diu ===
In late 1553, Seydi Ali was nominated as an admiral (reis) of Ottoman naval forces stationed in Basra. He was ordered to link up his galleys with those in Suez to better fight the Portuguese, but he had to go through Persian Gulf. Sefer was tasked to follow up with Seydi Ali and escort him safely back into the red sea, however, it was too late as the Ottoman fleet was ferociously routed in the Battle of the Gulf of Oman in August 1554. As the news reached, some of Sefer's crews argued to retreat back to Mocha immediately and wait for orders, however, Sefer, in a daring mission, he chose to follow up the Portuguese.

The Ottoman fleet consisted of only four light galiots. They arrived at the Peninsula of Diu where they established a blockade and hunted for any Portuguese ships nearby. The Ottomans succeeded in capturing and looting four heavy merchant vessels. It is said that 160,000 cruzados were taken. Sefer had the Portuguese crew arrested and placed a contingent in each captured ship. He ordered them to return to Mocha and wait for him there. However, an armed Portuguese vessel under Balthazar Lobato sighted the Ottoman fleet, and when the Portuguese crew saw it, they revolted and overwhelmed the Ottoman forces They set to sail for India again, however at this time, Sefer gave up in hunting for more ships and decided to return to his base. On his way, he sighted the same Portuguese ships, and realizing what had happened, Sefer engaged them and succeeded in capturing them back. Sefer then gave a chase to Lobato's ship until it surrendered without a fight Now with nine ships under his command, he returned to his base within a few weeks.

=== The Hunt for Sefer and Defence of Mocha ===
The attack on Mocha in 1558 was a direct attack by the Portuguese against Mocha, the base of Sefer Reis.

The Portuguese began a hunt for Sefer Reis, in the fall of 1554 Portuguese commander Manuel de Vasconcelos was dispatched from Goa with a large fleet with the hopes of intercepting Sefer Reis. Vasconcelos reached the Yemeni coast in the beginning of 1555 but found no sight of Sefer Reis, he continued to cruise between Hormuz and India but yielded no results and returned to India.

Another Portuguese squadron was dispatched against Sefer Reis the following winter, this time led by Joao Peixoto. The Portuguese found the fleet of Sefer Reis at his base in Mocha, however they did not approach it. In addition, Sefer Reis conducted a raid off the coast of India in 1556 during which he seized two Portuguese merchant vessels near the port of Chaul.

Joao de Lisboa wrote a letter from captivity in Cairo in 1555 to the Portuguese viceroy, recommending a direct strike against his base in Mocha reporting that it had no walls or fortress, it was defended by only 400 Arab tribesmen and that Sefer Reis had no more than 400 men in his fleet.

By 1557 the Portuguese decided to adopt the strategy of forcing an engagement with Sefer Reis in the open seas. The Portuguese armed a force of twenty oared vessels and prepared for a direct attack against his base in Mocha.

The Portuguese fleet was dispatched in the fall of 1557 under the command of Alvaro da Sylveira. This fleet arrived in the Red Sea in February 1558, where the Portuguese learned that Sefer Reis was still in Mocha but preparing to leave again for another campaign, therefore Sylveira attacked Mocha. Sylveira found that Sefer's forces had been warned of his approach and he was met with a heavy bombardment of artillery from both land and sea, that damaged several ships and killed a dozen sailors, forcing the Portuguese to retreat.

Sylveira lingered off the coast for several more weeks in hopes of capturing some merchant ships, but this also failed to produce any results so he returned to Muscat. The Portuguese struggles against Sefer Reis continued as they suffered another defeat by him in 1560.

=== Battle of Kamaran ===
In 1560 a Portuguese squadron was ambushed and defeated off the coast of Kamaran by four galleys of Sefer Reis who seized two Portuguese ships.

The Portuguese suffered a defeat by Sefer Reis in 1558 when they attempted a direct attack against his base in Mocha. The Portuguese commander Christovao Pereira Homem had set sail to the port of Massawa, where they were greeted by the Turks who caused a delay which allowed Sefer Reis to make preparations for an ambush against them. Sefer Reis disguised his ship to look like a rich spice ship from Aceh fooling the Portuguese who intended on seizing it, however, they were ambushed by the Ottoman galleys who killed and captured everyone aboard two Portuguese ships while the other two fled to India.

=== Commander of the Ottoman Indian Ocean Fleet and further campaigns ===
In 1560, the Ottoman governor of Egypt Sofu Hadım Ali Pasha blocked the reappointment of Seydi Ali Reis to the rank of admiral after his long journey back from Aceh, which was being pushed by Rüstem Pasha. Instead, Sefer Reis was promoted to the supreme command of the Ottoman Empire's entire Indian Ocean fleet. In fall 1561, hearing news of Sefer attempting to establish a blockade between Hormuz and India, a Portuguese armada consisting of twenty-three oared vessels, two galleons, and 650 men under Dom Francisco Mascarenhas, sailing from Goa, the armada nearly met Sefer's small squadron, but Sefer's successfully avoided them and the Portuguese returned empty-handed, later Sefer captured a Portuguese merchant vessel.

=== Sefer's last campaign and death ===
In November 1565, Sefer set sail with a fleet of ten galleys, by far the largest he had ever commanded, in what was intended to be the greatest and most daring campaign the corsair had ever undertaken. He sailed only as far as Mocha, where he sailed through the summer sailing season and into the fall, Sefer set out with the intention of pillaging the entire Swahili coast and proceeding all the way to Mozambique, where he had great hopes of catching, such an assault promised to result in an unparalleled amount of captives and cargo being captured. Perhaps more importantly, it could have had significant geopolitical repercussions because it cut off the only maritime route that connected Lisbon to its eastern territories.

Sefer had left late the year before and was a day and a half away from Mocha on his way to the island of Socotra when, suddenly, he became very ill. He had to change his destination to Aden due to his health, and there he died three days after arriving.
