= Conquest of Paraíba =

- Part of the Dutch invasions of Brazil
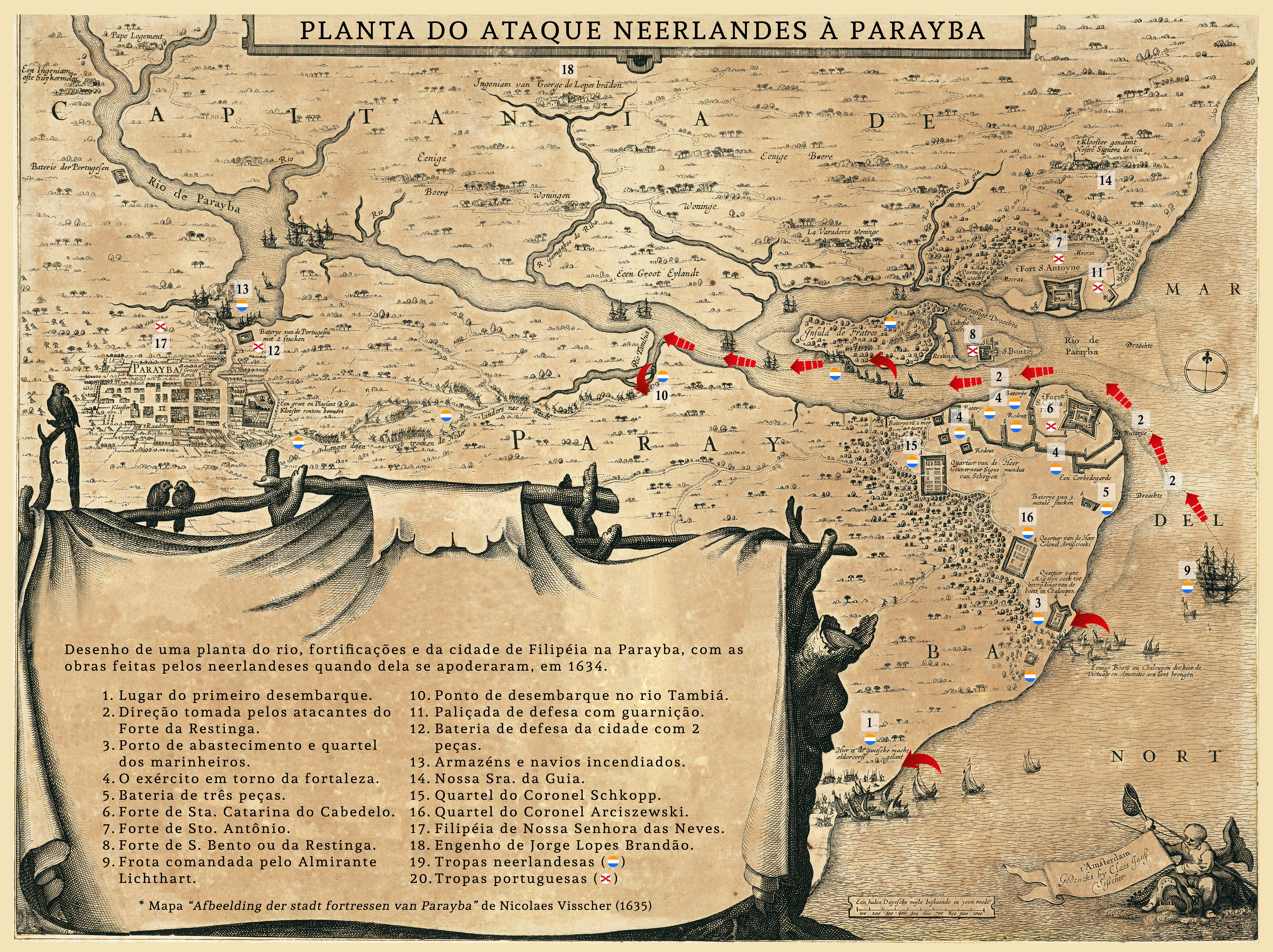
- A map of the conquest
Date	November 25 – December 25, 1634
Location	Paraíba, Brazil
Result	Dutch victory

Belligerents
Portugal	Dutch Republic; West India Company

Commanders and leaders
(Portugal) João de Mattos Cardoso	(Dutch West India Company) Jan Lichthart (Dutch West India Company) Gaspar van der ley

Strength
Unknown	21 ships 11 yachts

Casualties and losses
Unknown	82 dead, 102 wounded

The Conquest of Paraíba refers to the attempts by Dutch forces in 1630 to seize control of Paraíba, Brazil, from the Portuguese, mainly for the lucrative sugar cane market.

== Details ==
After conquering Recife, Lichthart decided to set sail for Paraíba. In December, Lichthart led an expedition towards Paraíba with a fleet comprising 21 ships and 11 yachts, organized into two separate squadrons. The expedition reached the Jaguaribe River, the easternmost point of Brazil, on December 3. Upon arrival, they immediately deployed 600 soldiers due to an encounter with Portuguese forces. After their initial victory, reinforcements under Gaspar van der Ley arrived, and they proceeded southward along the peninsula of the Paraíba River, where they laid siege to the well-fortified Fort Santa Catarina do Cabelo. During the siege, the commander of the garrison, João de Mattos Cardoso, died, prompting the Dutch forces to appoint a replacement who also died just one day after taking charge. After two weeks of siege, the fort finally surrendered to the Dutch. The Dutch only having 82 dead, and 102 wounded, invaded Fort São Felipe and the regional capital, Filipeia de Nossa Senhora das Nevoas (known today as João Pessoa). Subsequently, they captured other nearby forts, and one of them, Fort Cabedelo, was renamed Frederiksdorp in honor of the Dutch Stadtholder, Frederik Hendrik, the Prince of Orange.
