= Omani–Portuguese conflicts =

C. 1650–1730 series of wars

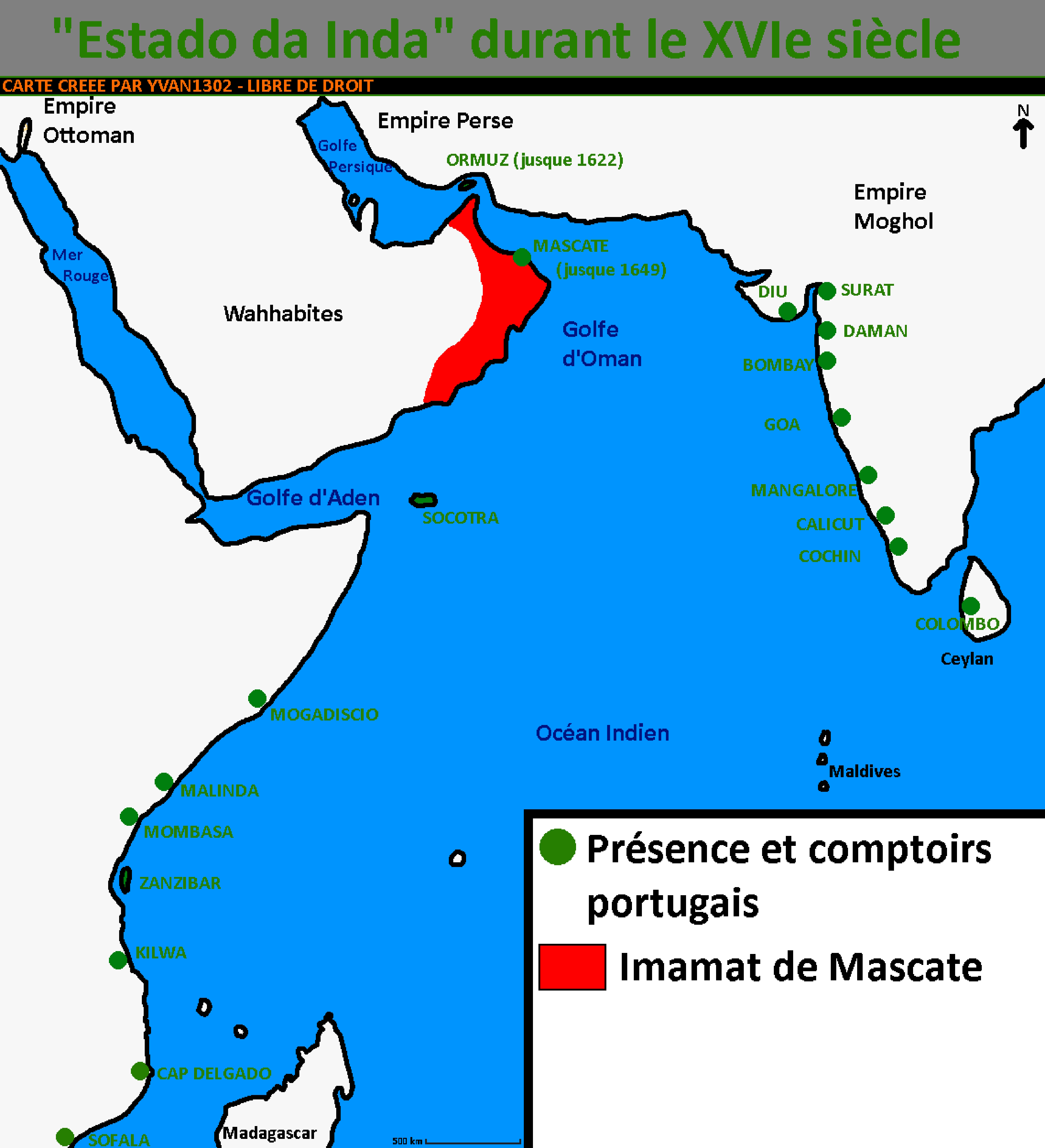
Date	c. 1650 – 1730
Location	Persian Gulf, Indian Ocean and East Africa

Belligerents
Kingdom of Portugal	Imamate of Oman

The Omani–Portuguese conflicts were a series of military engagements between the Kingdom of Portugal and the Imamate of Oman from c. 1650 to 1730.
