= List of battles involving Portugal east of the Cape of Good Hope =

This is a list of articles dedicated to military actions involving the Portuguese east of the Cape of Good Hope, in Africa or in Asia, on land or at sea, between the 16th and 20th centuries.

== 16th century ==
- 1501 - First Battle of Cannanore
- 1503 - Battle of Calicut
- 1504 - Battle of Pandarane, Battle of Cochin
- 1505 - Sack of Kilwa, Battle of Mombasa (1505)
- 1506 - Second Battle of Cannanore, Siege of Angediva
- 1507 - Battle of Barawa, Portuguese conquest of Ormuz, Siege of Cannanore
- 1508 - Battle of Chaul, Battle of Dabul
- 1509 - Battle of Diu
- 1510 - Portuguese conquest of Goa
- 1511 - Portuguese conquest of Malacca
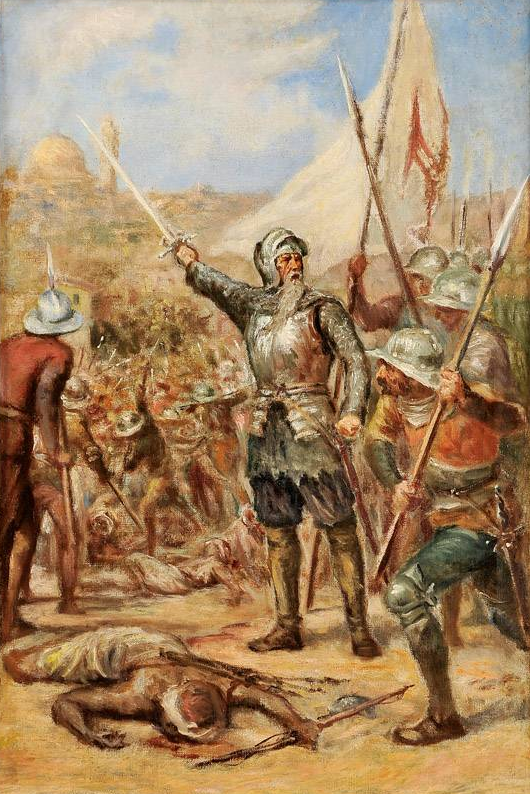
  "Conquest of Malacca", study by Ernesto Condeixa.
- 1513 - Siege of Aden
- 1517 - Siege of Jeddah
- 1521 - Battle of Aceh (1521)
- 1521 - Attack on Bintan (1521), Battle of Tamão, Portuguese invasion of Bahrain
- 1522 - Battle of Veniaga Island
- 1522 - Pedir expedition (1522)
- 1523 - Battle of Muar River
- 1524 - Acehnese conquest of Pasai
- 1525 - Battle of Lingga
- 1526 - Siege of Bintan, Siege of Calicut
- 1528 - Battle of Aceh (1528)
- 1529 - Siege of Bahrain (1529)
- 1531 - Siege of Diu
- 1535 - Battle of Ugentana
- 1536 - Second Battle of Ugentana
- 1538 - Siege of Diu
- 1541 - Battle of Suakin, Battle of El Tor, Battle of Suez (1541)
- 1542 - Battle of Benadir, Battle of Baçente, Battle of Jarte, Battle of the Hill of the Jews, Battle of Wofla
- 1542 - Battle of Wayna Daga
- 1545 - Attack on Jailolo
- 1546 - Siege of Diu
- 1547 - Battle of Perlis River
- 1548 - Aden Revolt, Battle of Ash-Shihr
- 1551 - Siege of Qatif
- 1552 - Battle of Muscat
- 1553 - Battle of the Strait of Hormuz
- 1554 - Battle of the Gulf of Oman
- 1557 - Siege of Kotte
- 1559 - Siege of Bahrain, Battle of Mulleriyawa
- 1560 - First Jaffna Campaign
- 1561 - Siege of Moji
- 1565 - Battle of Fukuda Bay
- 1568 - Siege of Malacca
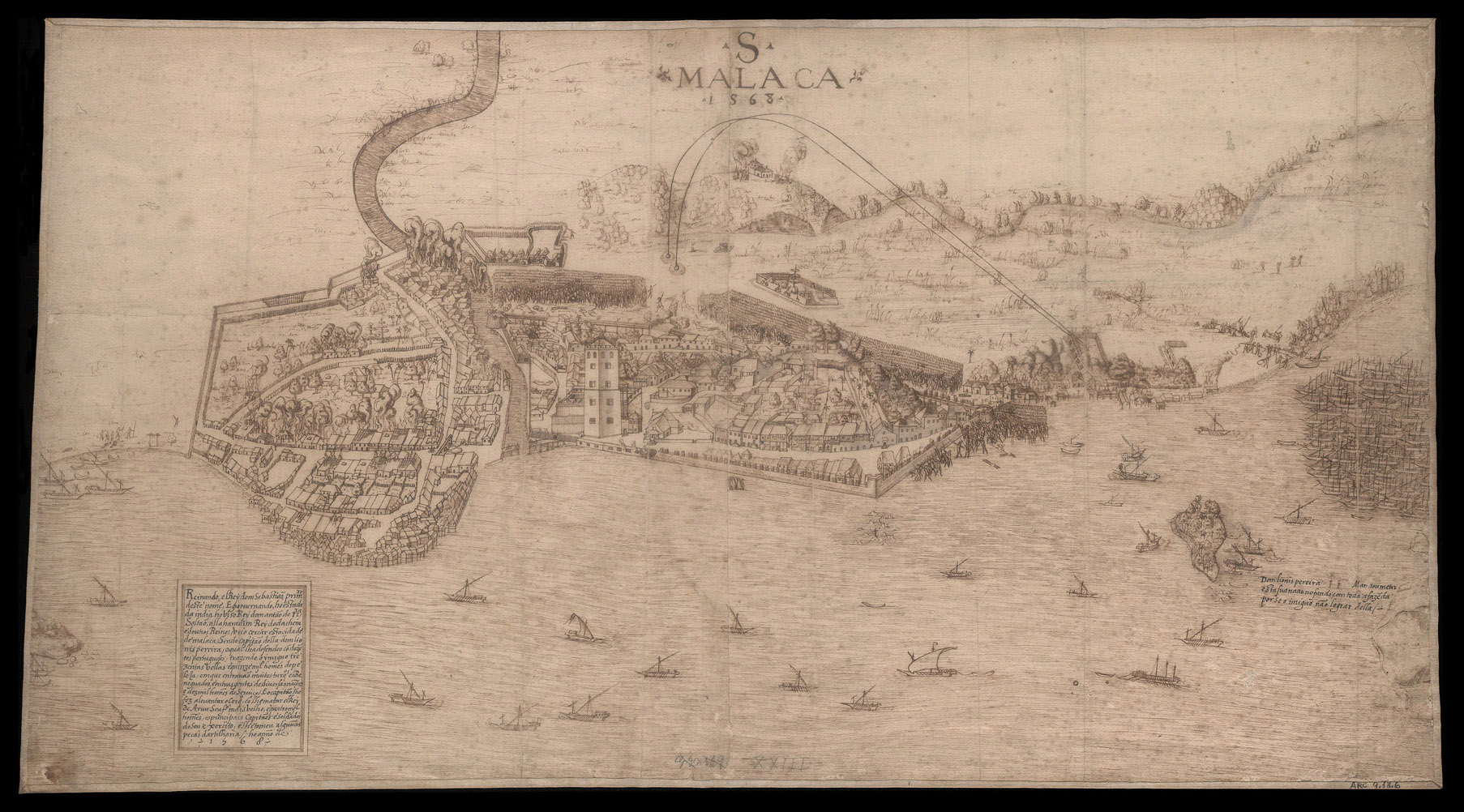
  Portuguese Malacca sieged in 1568 by an Acehnese force.
- 1569 - Battle of Aceh
- 1571 - Siege of Chaliyam
- 1581 - Siege of Daman (1581)
- 1586 - Ottoman–Portuguese conflicts (1586–1589)
- 1586 - Battle of Leitao coast
- 1587 - Siege of Johor
- 1591 - Second Jaffna Campaign
- 1594 - Campaign of Danture
- 1599 - Siege of Kottakkal

== 17th century ==
- 1601 - Battle of Bantam
- 1606 - Aceh expedition (1606), Siege of Malacca, Battle of Cape Rachado
- 1610 - Nossa Senhora da Graça incident
- 1612 - Battle of Swally, Kandyan commerce raiding against Portugal (1612–1613)
- 1615 - Battle of Formoso River
- 1619 - Portuguese conquest of the Jaffna kingdom
- 1620 - Battle of Perak River
- 1622 - Anglo-Persian capture of Ormuz, Battle of Macau
- 1625 - Action of 1 February 1625
- 1629 - Battle of Duyon River
- 1630 - Battle of Randeniwela
- 1632 - Siege of Hooghly
- 1633–1643 - Siege of Sohar
- 1638 - Battle of Gannoruwa, Battle of Goa (1638), Siege of Daman (1638-1639)
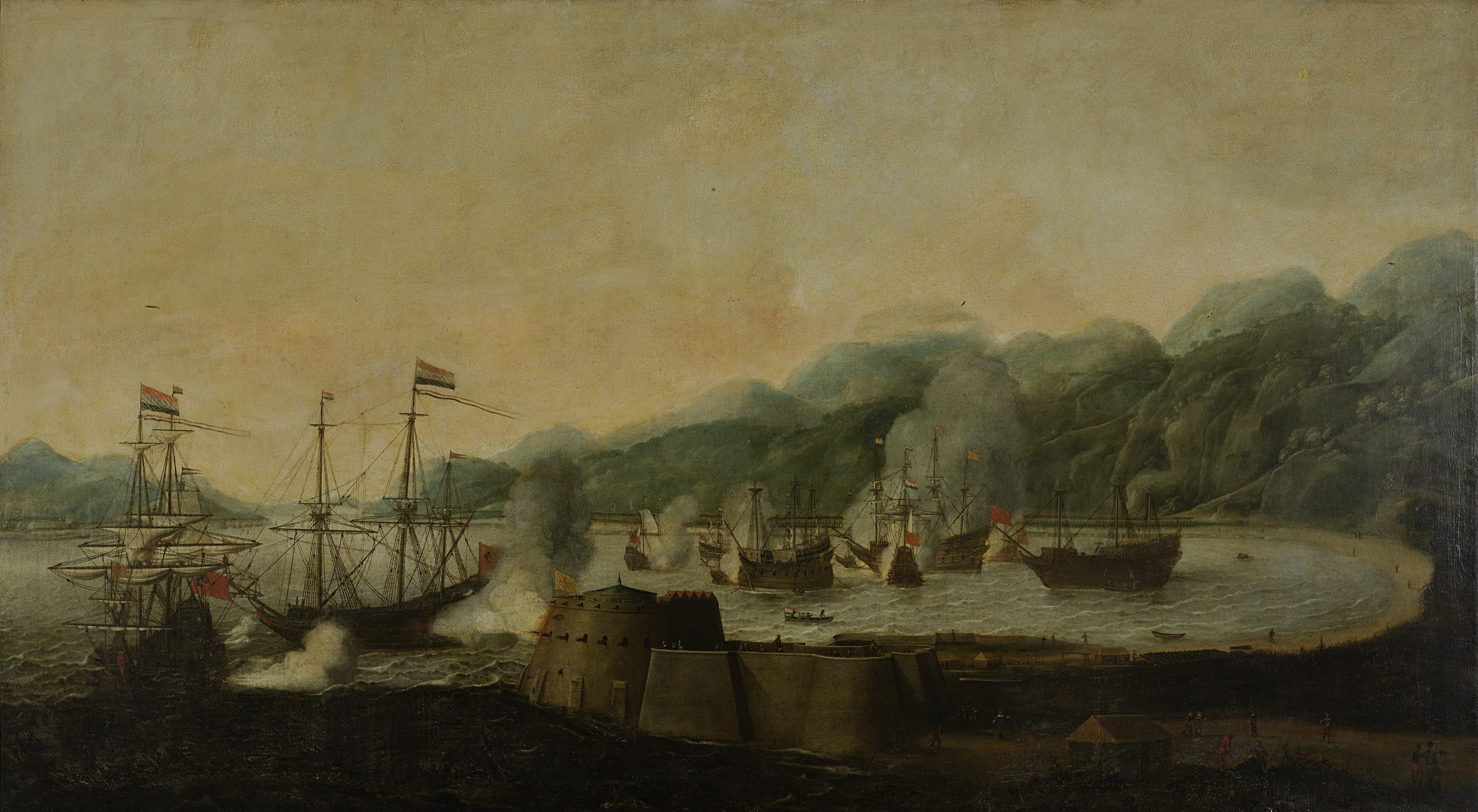
  "A Dutch Surprise Attack on Thee Portuguese Galleons in the Bay of Goa, 30 September 1639", by Hendrick van Anthonissen.
- 1639 - Action of 30 September 1639
- 1640 - Siege of Galle
- 1641 - Siege of Malacca
- 1654 - Action of 23 March 1654, Action of 2 May 1654
- 1682 - Siege of Goa
- 1693 - Battle of Bassein
- 1694 - Battle of Daman
- 1696–1698 - Siege of Mombasa

== 18th century ==
- 1704 - Battle of Surat
- 1738 - Battle of Vasai
- 1746 - Siege of Alorna, Siege of Tiracol
- 1752 - Battle of Calicut

== 19th century ==
- 1809–1810 - Battle of the Tiger's Mouth
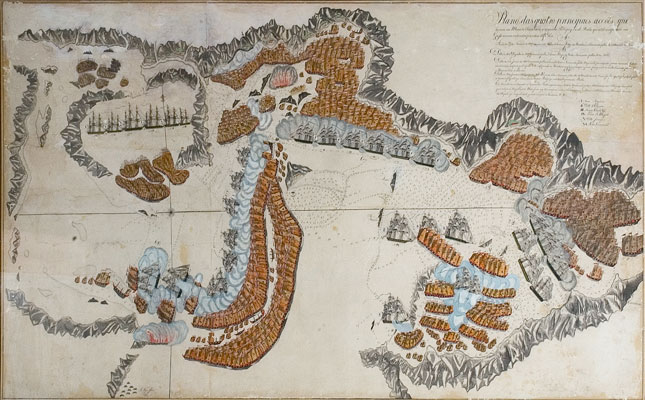
  Portuguese Navy Fighting Pirates in the Pearl River Delta.
- 1846 - Revolt of the Faitiões
- 1849 - Passaleão incident

== 20th century ==
- 1942–1943 - Battle of Timor
- 1961 - Annexation of Goa
- 1964–1974 - Mozambican War of Independence

== See also ==
- Portuguese Empire
- Portuguese India
- Military history of Portugal
