= Battle of Mombasa (1589) =

1589 battle between Portuguese and Zimba forces

- Part of the Ottoman–Portuguese conflicts (1586–1589)
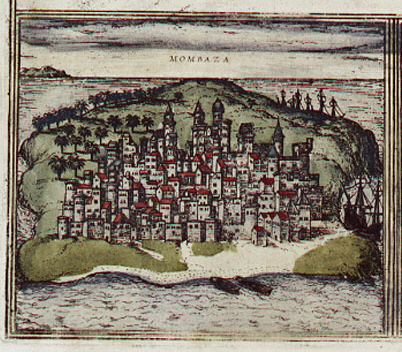
- 16th century depiction of Mombasa.
Date	March 5, 1589
Location	East African coast
Result	Portuguese victory
Territorial changes	Ottomans expelled from the East African coast

Belligerents
(Portugal) Kingdom of Portugal; Zimba tribe	Ottoman Empire: Sultanate of Mombasa

Commanders and leaders
(Portugal) Tomé de Sousa Coutinho	Mir Ali Beg (POW)

Casualties and losses
Few	Heavy

The Battle of Mombasa took place on 5 March 1589, between Portuguese and Zimba forces under the command of Tomé Coutinho against the Ottomans. The Portuguese would reconquer the city and capture Mir Ali Beg.

== Background ==
At the end of the 16th century, Muslims in the east African coast appealed to the governor of Ottoman Yemen, Hasan Pasha, for help. Then, in 1586, forces consisting of a galley and some small boats under the command of Mir Ali Beg arrived in the region. Then, the cities of Mogadishu, Barawa, Lamu and Pemba, together with Mombasa, declared their allegiance to the Ottoman Empire.

In the summer of 1588, Mir Ali Beg set sail from Mocha with a fleet of 5 oarships. However, the Portuguese captain of the east-African coast Mateus Mendes de Vasconcelos, was at Malindi with a small force, and was already well aware of the approach of Mir Ali Beg: a network of spies and informants within the Red Sea itself kept the Portuguese up to date on Turkish movements. Approaching Malindi by night, the flotilla of Mir Ali Beg was bombarded by a Portuguese artillery battery, and so it sailed away to Mombasa.

The Ottomans tried to conquer Pate and Mombasa from the Portuguese in this year, but were defeated four times.

== Battle ==
When the Portuguese Viceroy in Goa learned that Mir Ali Beg was off the coast of East Africa, he handed over a fleet of eighteen ships to the command of his brother, Tomé de Sousa Coutinho to destroy the Ottomans. As the Portuguese fleet approached Barawa, the Ottoman fleet went to Mombasa. On March 5, 1589, Coutinho's fleet closed the entrance to the island, bombarded the city and burnt the Turkish fleet in the port. The Ottoman soldiers in the city were attacked by the Zimba tribe and all of them died. Mir Ali Beg was captured and taken to Lisbon where he would convert to Catholicism and live the rest of his life there.

== Aftermath ==
After the battle, the Portuguese sacked Manda for having supported the Ottomans and executed the King of Lamu and several important civilians of Pate and Kilifi, whilst the faithful ruler of Malindi was rewarded for his support.

The withdrawn of the Ottoman governor of Basra in 1596, followed by the loss of Mocha in 1636 and Aden in 1645, marked the end to Ottoman pretensions to Indian Ocean empire.

The Portuguese would remain under control of Mombasa until its conquest by Oman in 1698. However, it would briefly return to Portuguese control by captain Álvaro Caetano (1728–1729).

== See also ==
- Ottoman-Portuguese conflicts (1586-1589)
- Battle of Mombasa (1528)
- Battle of Mombasa (1505)
- Siege of Muscat (1581)
- Mir Ali Beg
