= Battle of Mombasa (1528) =

Battle of Mombasa 1528
- Part of Portuguese Battles in the East
Date	1528
Location	Mombasa, east Africa
Result	Portuguese victory

Belligerents
Portuguese Empire; Supported by: Malindi Kingdom	Sultanate of Mombasa

Commanders and leaders
Nuno da Cunha	Sultan of Mombasa

Strength
4 ships. 800 Portuguese soldiers. 500–800 Malindi warriors 200 Montangane warriors Zanzibari warriors.	600 archers. 8 cannon.

Casualties and losses
25 dead.	Heavy

The Battle of Mombasa in 1528 was a military engagement between Portuguese forces under the command of the Portuguese governor of India Nuno da Cunha and the Sultanate of Mombasa.

== The Battle ==
In 1528, Nuno da Cunha was nominated by King John III of Portugal as the next governor of India. He was dispatched that year with a powerful fleet of 13 ships and 3000 soldiers.

However, plague broke out in the ships mid-voyage and after the fleet met ill weather while rounding the Cape of Good Hope it was scattered, while some sank. Nuno da Cunha therefore decided to call on the east African coast with three ships. Some ill with scurvy were left in Zanzibar. The governor anchored in the harbour of Mombasa, where he intended to seek shelter for several months, hence he requested its sultan for lodgings and authorization to land his men, which, however were refused. Upon insisting, the Portuguese ships were fired upon from shore. Cunha therefore decided to capture the city, towards which he was joined by a carrack loaned by the king of Malindi, and also the sheikh of Otondo, a neighbouring town with a grievance against the sultan of Mombasa, and also Mumbo Mohamed, son of the man who had previously received Vasco da Gama when he passed through the city. The sultan of Mombasa strongly fortified the harbour and brought 600 archers into the town.

The Portuguese sailed up the Mombasa harbour past its defenses and anchored in front of the city, which was bombarded. The next morning they staged a landing. 450 men, of which 60 were arquebusiers were landed on Kilindini. The Portuguese passed by a mosque and met only token resistance from groups of archers on their way to the city, which was captured with only 25 wounded. The sultan of Mombasa evacuated the city with its inhabitants. The following day 200 Portuguese captured the fortifications in the harbour, but upon returning to the city suffered an ambushed and lost 25 men.

== Aftermath ==
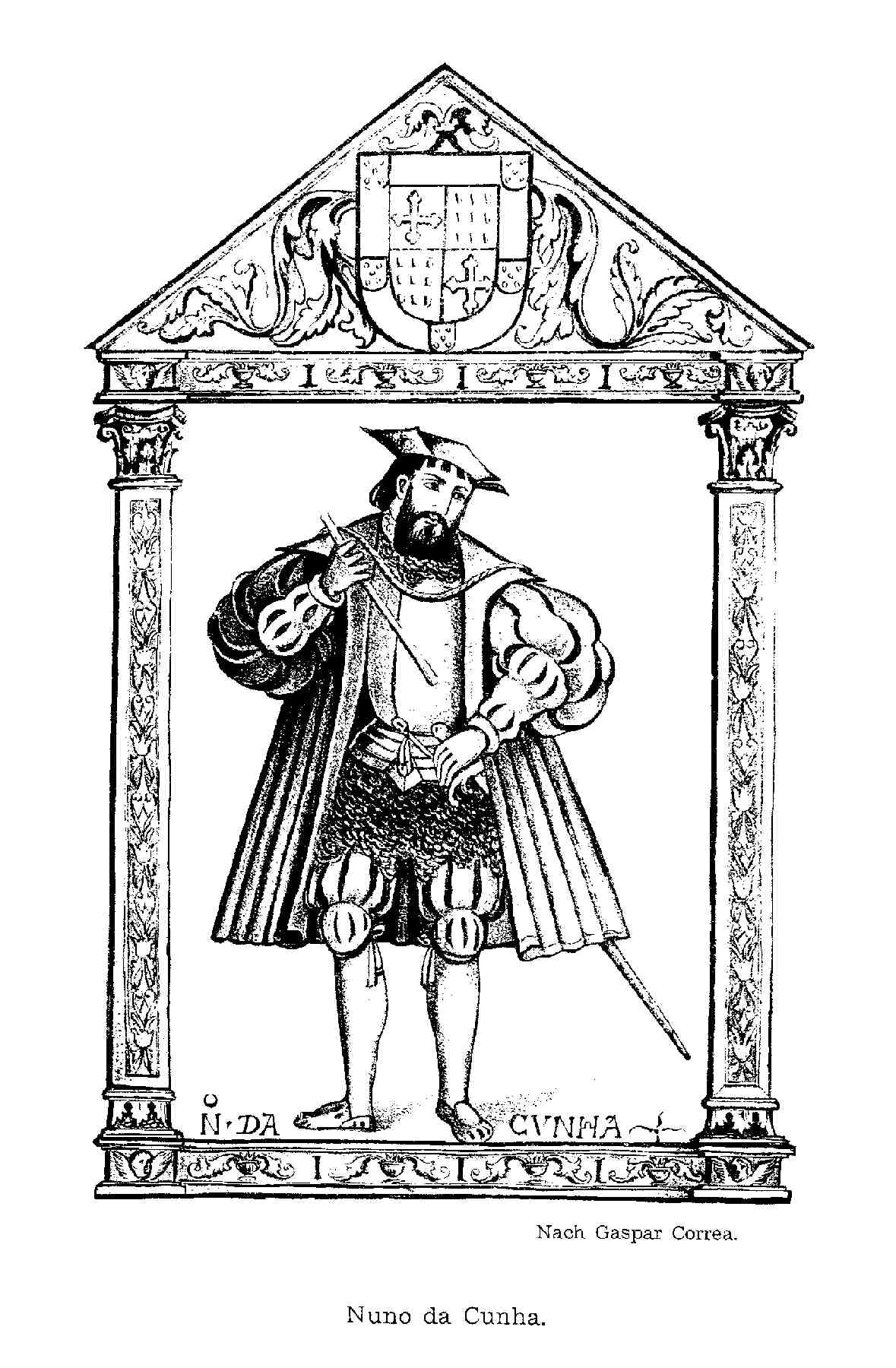
The Portuguese governor of India Nuno da Cunha.

The rulers of Pemba, Zanzibar and other towns sent Nuno da Cunha gifts in appreciation for having defeated the ruler of Mombasa, who oppressed them.

While at Mombasa, the Portuguese fought with a large Turkish trade ship. Since minor skirmishes between the Portuguese and the Mombasans persisted, Nuno da Cunha delivered the sultan of Mombasa an ultimatum, after which he agreed to become a tributary vassal of Portugal and ransom his city. The weather however, proved fatal for the Portuguese, and seeing that the sultan stalled the payment of the tribute, Mombasa was sacked and torched.

Nuno da Cunha left in May 1529 for Malindi, further north.

== See also ==
- Portuguese India
- Portuguese India Armadas
- Battle of Mombasa (1505)
- Ottoman–Portuguese conflicts (1586–1589)
