= Ottavio Farnese (1598–1643) =

Nobleman of the Duchy of Parma

Ottavio Farnese (20 December 1598 – 1643) was a nobleman of the Duchy of Parma, an illegitimate son of the ruling duke, Ranuccio I Farnese.

== Life ==
Ottavio was born in Parma on 20 December 1598, an illegitimate son of Ranuccio I Farnese, Duke of Parma, and Briseide Ceretoli, who was at that time unmarried; she was the daughter of Ottavio Ceretoli, a captain who had died in Flanders in the following of Alessandro Farnese, Duke of Parma.

In 1600 Ranuccio married Margherita Aldobrandini, a grandniece of pope Clement VIII. The marriage was initially childless, so in 1605 he legitimised Ottavio and recognised him as his successor and heir to the dukedom. From 1607 to 1620 Ottavio was feudal lord of large estates, both in the Duchy of Parma – including Borgo San Donnino, Fiorenzuola and the Val di Nure – and lands inherited from his great-grandmother Margaret of Austria in the Kingdom of Naples, including Altamura, Campli, Castellamare, Cittaducale, Leonessa, Montereale, Ortona, Penne and Roccaguglielma. The suggestion that he married Sofronia Sanvitale, daughter of Girolamo, marchese of Sala Baganza and Colorno, is spurious; she never existed.

In 1610 Ranuccio and Margherita had a son, Alessandro, but he proved to be deaf and was felt incapable of succeeding to the dukedom. In 1612 they had another male child, Odoardo, who was healthy. From about 1615 Ranuccio began to indicate that he would recognise Odoardo as his heir instead of Ottavio, and in 1620 he revoked Ottavio's investiture in his feudal estates. Ottavio organised a conspiracy against his father, but this failed and he was stripped of his titles and imprisoned in Parma in 1621. He remained in prison until his death in 1643.

== Works ==
- Quaestiones definitae. Ex triplici philosophiae, rationali, naturali, morali, in Parmensi Academia publice triduum disputatae (in Latin). Parma: Anteo Viotti. 1613.
