= Siege of Kottakkal =

- Part of Portuguese Battles in the East
Date	1 September 1599 – 16 March 1600
Location	Malabar Coast, India
Result	Portuguese-Zamorin victory

Belligerents
Portuguese Empire; Kingdom of Calicut	Kunjali Marakkar

Commanders and leaders
André Furtado de Mendonça; Zamorin of Calicut	Mohammed Ali Kunjali Marakkar IV

Strength
4 galleys, 80 light galleys, 5 manchuas, 8 piriches, 2,000 soldiers. 6,000 nayars.	1,500 warriors

Casualties and losses
Few dead	All men killed or captured. Kunjali captured.

The siege of Kottakkal also known as the battle of Cunhale River (batalha do rio do Cunhale in Portuguese) was a military engagement between the joint forces of the Portuguese Empire and the Zamorin of Calicut against the stronghold of Kunjali Marakkar (Cunhale in Portuguese) Kottakkal called by the Portuguese Forte Branco ("White Fort").

== Background ==
As the head of a dynasty of Muslim privateers or pirates, Kunjali Marakkar was the admiral of the naval forces of the Zamorin of Calicut, usually hostile towards the Portuguese.

Kunjali however began acting in growing arrogant and independent fashion towards the Zamorin. He took on presumptuous titles such as "Lord of the Indian Seas", which clashed with the title of Zamorin ("Lord of the Sea"), but also "King of the Malabar Moors", "Expeller of the Portuguese" and "Defender of Mohammedanism".

The Zamorin and the Portuguese Viceroy of India Dom Francisco da Gama therefore concluded a truce and an alliance intended to assault his stronghold, seize or kill Kunjali and reintegrate his territory in the Kingdom of Calicut. His European-style fort was described as having parapets, port-holes, loop-holes and plentiful artillery.

As a result of wars with the Portuguese, by 1600 Kunjali had been reduced to about 1500 warriors in his domains, the capital of which stood by the Cunhale River.

== Siege ==
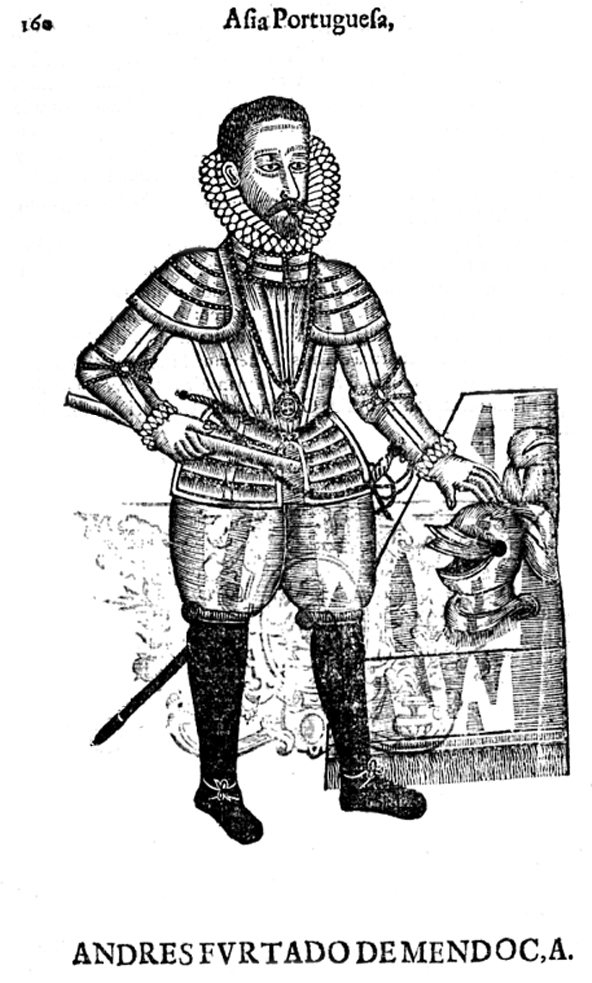
André Furtado de Mendonça as governor of India.

In 1 September 1599, the mouth of the Cunhale River was blockaded by Portuguese naval forces under the command of Dom Fernando de Noronha. In about 12 December 1599 the renown captain major of the Malabar Coast André Furtado de Mendonça arrived to take over operations from Dom Fernando, bringing reinforcements.

Peace talks between Kunkali and the Zamorin floundered, as Kunjali feared the Zamorin would execute him if he surrendered. About 150 warriors defected to the Zamorin.

After having personally met with the Zamorin to discuss the campaign, Mendonça tasked 4 light galleys to blockade the mouth of the River Tremapatão to prevent supplies from reaching the fortress through there. He had baskets and siege equipment manufactured in expectation of an assault. Portuguese reinforcements arrived by sea from every stronghold in India and by February these numbered about 4 galleys, 80 light galleys, a high number of support vessels, and about 2000 soldiers.

After a galleon arrived with heavy siege artillery, battering operations commenced, from across the river. Portuguese light vessels were brought into the river overland, thereby preventing Kunjalis men from fishing. On land, the Portuguese constructed siege works across the river, intensifying the bombardment.

Kunjali had a new length of outer stockade built in order to resist the siege, but these were assaulted by 300 Portuguese soldiers through an amphibious attack, while 300 more faced the reinforcements which Kunjali in person attempted to bring to try and relieve his warriors in the stockade. He was however, forced to stay back, having suffered 600 casualties, while the Portuguese suffered 11 dead and 40 wounded.

=== Attempted surrender of Kunjali Marakkar ===
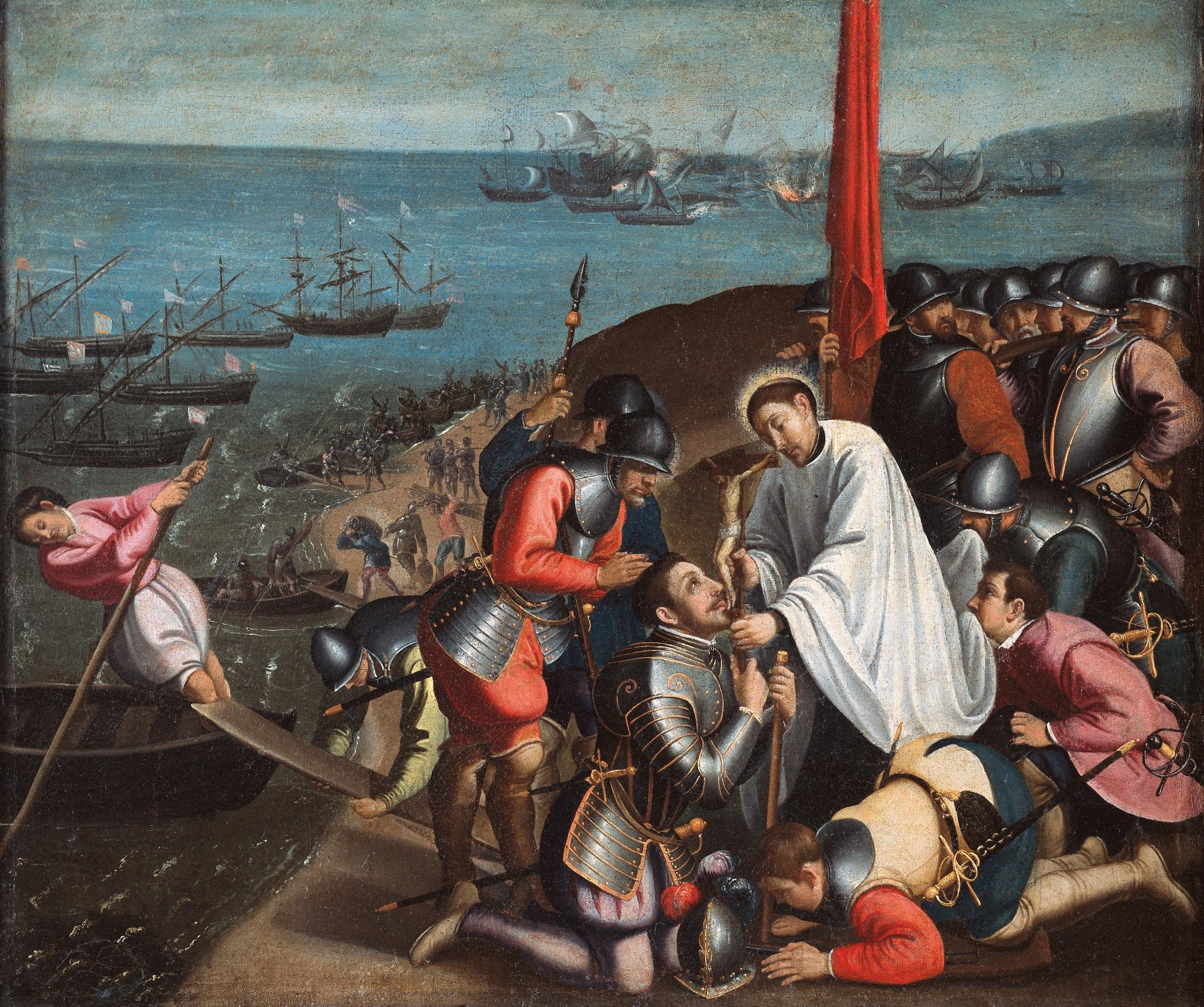
Portuguese soldiers in a 17th-century painting

As the siege dragged on, the Portuguese risked the wet monsoon season setting in or the Zamorin negotiating a separate peace in exchange for bribes. The Zamorin on his part pressured Kunjali to surrender, and he did. 250 warriors surrendered the outer defenses to the Zamorin and the Portuguese, whose soldiers began setting fire to the ships, houses and fortifications within. Believing the Zamorin to have betrayed him, Kunjali refused to surrender his fortress and prepared to continue resisting.

=== Final assault ===
Having had known of the attempted talks between Kunjali and the Zamorin, on 7 March, André Furtado attacked the stronghold with a squadron of 1200 men under his personal command from the south side, while Dom Francisco de Sousa attacked from the east with another squadron of 400 soldiers. The Zamorin followed with 6000 nairs. On the river, Portuguese naval forces attacked a riverfront bulwark.

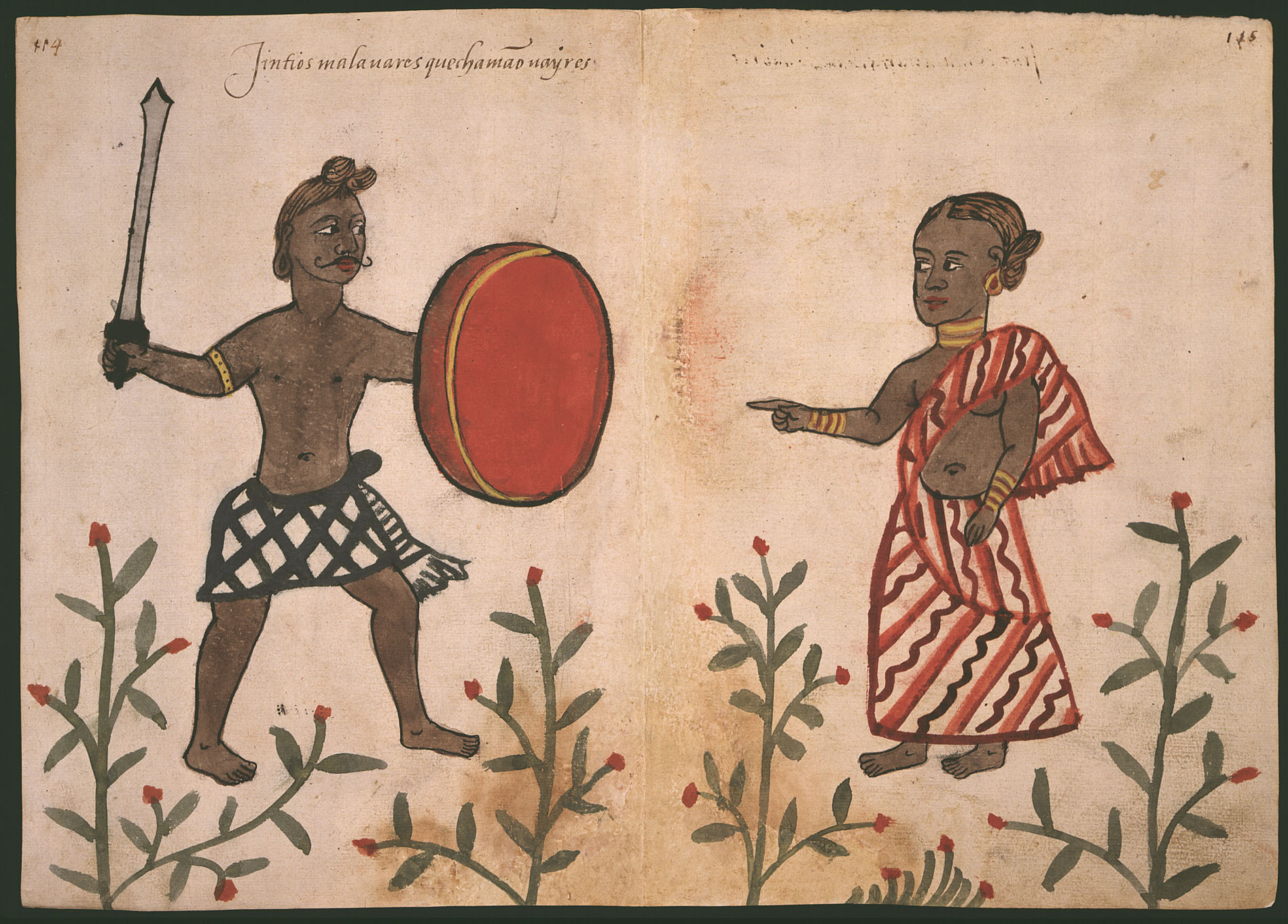
Nairs, depicted by the Portuguese in the Códice Casanatense

Kunjalis men abandoned the walls and sought refuge within the citadel. The houses occupied and Mendonça had new artillery batteries erected.

On 16 March, after two days of negotiations, Mendonça issued an ultimatum whereby he threatened to assault the citadel and slaughter its occupants, which succeeded in forcing Kunjali to surrender.

== Aftermath ==
Most of the besieged were found undernourished after months of siege. The healthiest males were taken by the Zamorin, while the women and children were set free.

Kunjali walked out accompanied by three captains, one of which was his nephew Cotiale and another the famous Chinese Chinale, responsible for slaughtering or creatively torturing the occupants of every Portuguese merchantship Kunjali captured. They tried surrender to the Zamorin, but were seized by the Portuguese, something which the Zamorin seems to have secretly agreed-to beforehand. The Zamorin did not want to be threatened by someone as powerful as Kunjali, yet he could not defeat Kunjali without the assistance of the Portuguese or execute him without angering the Muslim Mappila merchant community in his kingdom; Kunjali would only surrender if the Zamorin agreed to spare his life, and the Portuguese would only assist if they could have Kunjali; the Zamorin therefore promised Kunjali his life, and promised the Portuguese that he would allow them to "seize" Kunjali.

The artillery found within the fortress was equally shared between the Zamorin and the Portuguese but few other spoils were found within. On 22 March the fortress and town were set fire to and completely razed to the ground.

Portuguese Goa.

Kunjali and his captains were taken to Goa, tried in court, found guilty and beheaded on the public square, while his other followers were left to perish slowly in jail. Kunjalis body was cut to pieces and exhibited on the beaches of Panjim and Bardês, while his head was salted and sent to the Portuguese fortress of Cannanore to be displayed there on a standard as a warning to future pirates.

== See also ==
- Portuguese India
- List of governors of Portuguese India
