= List of wars involving Bahrain =

This is a list of wars involving the Kingdom of Bahrain and its predecessor states.

== List ==
Conflict	Bahrain and allies	Opponents	Result
Siege of Bahrain (1529) (20 September - 4 October 1529)	Bahraini rebels	Portuguese Empire	Victory: Bahraini victory
Siege of Bahrain (1559)	Portuguese Empire: Kingdom of Hormuz	Ottoman	Victory: Ottoman invasion repelled
Omani invasion of Bahrain (1717)	Safavid Empire: Bahrain	(Muscat and Oman) Omani Empire	Defeat: Bahrain sold back to the Safavids
Bani Utbah invasion of Bahrain (1783)	Zand Empire: Bahrain	Sheikhdom of Zubarah: Banu Utbah and other allied tribes	Defeat: Al Khalifa annexes Bahrain into its sheikhdom; End of Persian rule in Bahrain
Battle of Khakeekera (1811)	Bahrain; Kuwait	Emirate of Diriyah	Victory: Invasion of Bahrain repelled
Qatari–Bahraini War (1867–1868)	Bahrain; Abu Dhabi (1867)	Qatar	Ceasefire: Bahrain renounced claims on Qatar; British recognition of Al Thani in Qatar
Bombing of Bahrain in World War II (19 October 1940)	United KingdomSaudi ArabiaBahrain	Fascist Italy	Victory: Bombing of Bahrain repelled with minimal damage
Gulf War (1990–1991)	Kuwait; United States; United Kingdom; Saudi Arabia; France; Canada; Bangladesh; Egypt; Syria; Oman; United Arab Emirates; Bahrain; Qatar	Iraq	Victory: Iraqi withdrawal from Kuwait; Emir Jaber Al-Ahmad Al-Jaber Al-Sabah restored.; Heavy casualties and destruction of Iraqi and Kuwaiti infrastructure.
War in Afghanistan (2001–2014)	Afghanistan; United States; United Kingdom; Germany; Italy; France; Canada; Australia; New Zealand; Georgia; Poland; Romania; Turkey; Albania; Armenia; Austria; Azerbaijan; Bahrain; Belgium; Bosnia and Herzegovina; Bulgaria; Croatia; Czech Republic; Denmark; El Salvador; Estonia; Finland; Greece; Hungary; Iceland; Ireland; Jordan; Latvia; Lithuania; Luxembourg; Malaysia; Mongolia; Montenegro; Netherlands; Norway; Portugal; Republic of Macedonia; Singapore; Slovakia; Slovenia; South Korea; Spain; Sweden; Switzerland; Tonga; Ukraine; United Arab Emirates	Northern Alliance; Taliban al-Qaeda; Islamic Movement of Uzbekistan; HI-Gulbuddin; Hezb-e Islami Khalis; Haqqani network Lashkar-e-Taiba; Jaish-e-Mohammed; East Turkestan Islamic Movement; Tehrik-i-Taliban Pakistan; Islamic Emirate of Waziristan; Tehreek-e-Nafaz-e-Shariat-e-Mohammadi; Islamic Jihad Union Islamic Emirate of Afghanistan	Defeat: Fall of the Taliban government in Afghanistan; Destruction of al-Qaeda camps; Over two thirds of al-Qaeda's leadership demolished; Occupation of Afghanistan; Establishment of a new Afghan government; Killing of Osama bin Laden; Resurgence of Taliban; Withdrawal of allied forces
Intervention against ISIS (2014–present)	Iraq; Iraqi Kurdistan (Syria) Free Syrian Army; Syrian Kurdistan; United States; United Kingdom; Jordan; Turkey; Morocco; Australia; Belgium; Canada; Denmark; France; Bahrain; Qatar; Saudi Arabia; United Arab Emirates	Islamic State al-Qaeda: al-Nusra Front; Khorasan; Ahrar ash-Sham	Ongoing: Unilateral US-Arab intervention against Syrian Islamists.
Decisive Storm (2015–present)	Yemen (Hadi government); Saudi Arabia; Qatar; United Arab Emirates; South Korea; Kuwait; Bahrain; Jordan; Morocco; Egypt; Sudan	Yemen (Revolutionary Committee): Houthi fighters; Security Forces (pro-Saleh); Yemeni Republican Guard; Yemeni Air Force; Air Defence	Ongoing: Houthis dissolve Yemeni government.; Houthis take control of northern Yemen.
2026 Iran War (2026–present): 2026 Iranian strikes on Bahrain	Israel United States Supported by: Iranian opposition: Monarchists; NCRI; (Kurdistan Region) CPFIK; Salafi jihadists; NATO: Canada; France: Germany; Greece; Turkey; United Kingdom; Akrotiri and Dhekelia; Ukraine In-defense only: Bahrain Cyprus Iraq: Kurdistan Region; Jordan Kuwait Oman Saudi Arabia Syria Qatar United Arab Emirates	Iran Supported by: Axis of Resistance: Hezbollah; Houthi movement; Kata'ib Hezbollah; Popular Mobilization Forces; Islamic Resistance in Iraq; Palestinian Islamic Jihad; Islamic Group; In-defense only: Lebanon Houthi-controlled Yemen	Ongoing: Airstrikes including drone strikes on Bahrain

== See also ==
- Conflicts not considered as wars:
  - 1990s uprising in Bahrain
  - Bahraini uprising (2011–present)
