= Faza =

- Location within Kenya
- Coordinates: 2.06°S 41.11°E
- Country: Kenya
- County: Lamu County
- Time zone: UTC+3 (EAT)

Faza is a small town on the North coast on Pate Island, within the Lamu Archipelago in Kenya's former Coast Province.

Faza was known by the name of Ampaza by the Portuguese and dates back at least to the 14th century. In 1587, Faza was destroyed by the Portuguese as the local Sheikh had supported Mir Ali Beg, a notorious privateer who had earlier played a key role in ousting the Portuguese from Muscat. The Portuguese arrived from Goa with some 650 men on their punitive expedition, and unleashed their fury on Faza. Everybody they could find was killed, including the local Sheikh. The Portuguese preserved his head in a barrel of salt for display in India. After four days of looting they invited Faza's arch-rivals from Pate town to take away anything that they liked from Faza.

Faza was later resettled. The Portuguese in Faza constructed a chapel there, however, nothing remains of it. In the 18th century Faza again fell into decline due to the rise of Pate. The English Consul Holmwood visited the place in 1873 and found it "dirty and infected with diseases".

On 5 September 2009, a tragic fire took place, destroying 430 houses and leaving 2500 homeless. The Kenya Red Cross Society (KRCS) have provided housing and thousands of items of emergency needs, including blankets, sanitation equipment, tanker loads of water etc., to some of those affected.

The French government has funded a hospital, complete with theatre. This has removed the need for the four-hour boat trip to Lamu in emergencies. The cost was KSh.9.5 million/= for the construction and a further KSh.3.9 million/= for theatre equipment. The KRCS have spent a further KSh.23 million/= on wells and food supplies.

== See also ==
- Historic Swahili Settlements
- Swahili architecture

== Bibliography ==
- Martin, Chryssee MacCasler Perry and Esmond Bradley Martin: Quest for the Past. An historical guide to the Lamu Archipelago. 1973.
