= Tristão da Cunha =

Portuguese explorer (c.1460–c.1540)

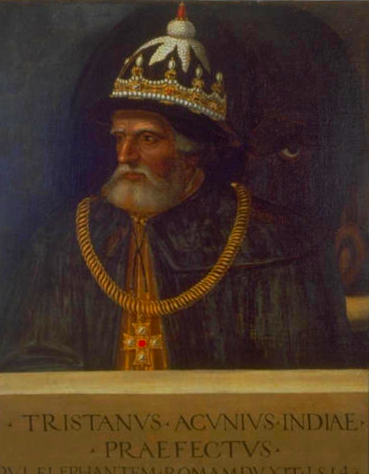
- c. 1514 portrait
- Born: c. 1460; Portugal
- Died: c. 1540 (aged 79–80); Portugal
- Occupations: Naval commander, explorer and ambassador
- Children: Nuno da Cunha

Tristão da Cunha (sometimes misspelled d'Acunha; Portuguese pronunciation: [tɾiʃˈtɐ̃w dɐ ˈkuɲɐ]; c. 1460 – c. 1540) was a Portuguese explorer and naval commander. In 1514, he served as ambassador from King Manuel I of Portugal to Pope Leo X, leading a luxurious embassy presenting in Rome the new conquests of Portugal. He later became a member of the Portuguese Privy Council. He was the first European to sight the island of Tristan da Cunha, which was named after him, though he never set foot on the island.

== Italian Wars ==
Da Cunha was born in Portugal, c. 1460. He served in the Third Italian War under Castilian general Gonzalo Fernández de Córdoba, participating in the Battle of Cerignola and being tasked with hosting the funeral of the fallen French general, Louis d'Armagnac, Duke of Nemours. He was also in command of Roca Guillerma, between Gaeta and Salerno, where he was briefly captured by the French army in a betrayal of the local nobility. Da Cunha was later freed. After returning to Portugal, he was nominated as the first viceroy of Portuguese India in 1504, but could not take up this post owing to a temporary blindness.

== 1506 voyage ==
In 1506, he was appointed commander of the 8th Indian Armada, a fleet of 15 ships sent to the east coast of Africa and off India. His cousin, Afonso de Albuquerque, was in charge of a squadron of five vessels in this fleet that subsequently detached. Their mission was to conquer Socotra Island and build a fortress there, hoping to close the trade in the Red Sea. They sailed together until they reached Mozambique. In the Mozambique Channel they found his friend Captain João da Nova stranded while returning from India. They rescued him and the ship Flor de la mar, both joining the fleet. After a series of successful attacks on Arab cities on the east coast of Africa, they headed to Socotra.

=== Discovery of Tristan da Cunha Archipelago ===
On this voyage Tristão da Cunha discovered a group of remote islands in the south Atlantic Ocean, 2,816 km (1,750 mi) from South Africa. Although rough seas prevented a landing then, he named the main island after himself, Ilha de Tristão da Cunha, which was later anglicized to Tristan da Cunha.

=== Battle of Barawa ===
He then set his eyes on Ajuran Empire territory, where the Battle of Barawa was fought. The Portuguese soldiers burned the city and looted it. The inhabitants who had fled to the interior would eventually return and rebuild the city. Tristão da Cunha was wounded in this battle. After that battle, he captured Socotra.

=== Capture of Socotra ===
In 1507, a Portuguese fleet commanded by Tristão da Cunha with Afonso de Albuquerque landed at the then capital of Suq and captured the port after a stiff battle. Their objective was to set a base in a strategic place on the route to India and to liberate the presumed friendly Christians from Islamic rule. The architect Tomás Fernandes started to build a fortress at Suq, the Forte de São Miguel de Socotorá. The lack of a proper harbour for wintering led to the loss of many moored Portuguese ships, the most important of which was the Santo António galleon under the command of captain Manuel Pais da Veiga. The infertility of the land led to famine and sickness in the garrison, and the Portuguese abandoned the island in 1511.

=== Actions in India ===
After a while, he distinguished himself in India in various actions, such as the Siege of Cannanore: the Portuguese garrison was on the verge of being overwhelmed, when on 27 August the fleet of 11 ships under Tristão da Cunha coming from Socotra appeared and relieved them with 300 men.

=== Raids in Northern Madagascar ===
He launched raids in Northern Madagascar aiming the destruction of Antalaotra and Arabo-Swahili settlements in Vohemar and Northwest coast.

== Embassy to Pope Leo X ==
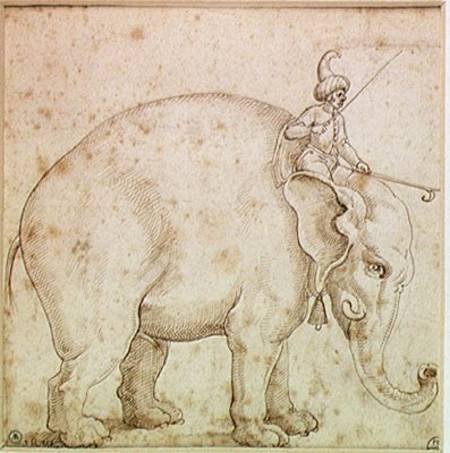
Elephant Hanno and his mahout, Pen and ink, 1575, Museum of Fine Arts in Angers.

After returning to Europe, Tristão da Cunha was sent as ambassador from King Manuel I to Pope Leo X in 1514 to present the new conquests of the Portuguese Empire, having Garcia de Resende as his secretary.

The huge, luxurious embassy of one hundred and forty persons made its way through Alicante and Majorca, arriving on the outskirts of Rome in February. They walked the streets of Rome on 12 March 1514 in an extravagant procession of exotic wildlife and wealth of the Indies, with many dressed in "Indian style". The procession featured an elephant named Hanno, as a gift to the pope, and forty-two other beasts, including two leopards, a panther, some parrots, turkeys and rare Indian horses. Hanno carried a platform of silver on its back, shaped as a castle containing a safe with royal gifts, including vests embroidered with pearls and gems, and coins of gold minted for the occasion. The pope received the procession in the Castel Sant'Angelo. The elephant knelt down thrice in reverence and then, following a wave of his Indian mahout (keeper), used its trunk to suck water from a bucket and sprayed it over the crowd and the Cardinals.

By 29 April 1515, the Portuguese had depleted their funds, but they sought a bull signed by the pope, who sent back rich gifts to King Manuel. The king responded with a ship full of spices and, later, an Indian rhinoceros sent to him from the sultan Muzaffar Shah II of Gujarat. The boat that transported it was wrecked off Genoa on early February 1516, and the rhinoceros was portrayed by Albrecht Dürer in his very famous Rhinoceros woodcuts in June of 1516 after sketches of it traveled to Nuremberg.

Although Tristão da Cunha had never assumed the post of Viceroy of India, his son Nuno da Cunha was the 9th Governor of Portuguese India in 1529. The tomb of Tristão da Cunha is located at the convent of Nossa Senhora da Encarnação in Olhalvo (in the municipality of Alenquer).
