= Battle of Calicut (1503) =

Naval battle

- Part of First Luso-Malabarese War
- Battle of Calicut, 1900 depiction.
Date	5–6 January 1503 (1 day)
Location	Calicut, India
Result	Portuguese victory

Belligerents
Portuguese Empire	Calicut; Arab privateers

Commanders and leaders
Vasco da Gama	Khoja Kassein; Cojambar

Strength
10 Carrack; 6 caravels	20 large ships 40 gun-mounted sambuks Hundreds of smaller ships

Casualties and losses
Low	Very heavy

The naval Battle of Calicut was a military encounter between the 16 ships (10 carracks and six caravels) of the 4th Portuguese Armada and a fleet led by two Arabic corsairs formed under the orders of the Zamorin of Calicut.

Pedro Álvares Cabral, was a Portuguese nobleman, military commander, navigator and explorer. He was dispatched to India to make a treaty with the Zamorin of Calicut and to set up a Portuguese feitoria in the city. He was successful but and there was conflict between the local Arab merchant guilds. The Portuguese trade post was overrun in a riot and almost 70 Portuguese were killed. The Zamorin ignored Portuguese complaints and Cabral bombarded the city. War thus broke out between Portugal and Calicut.

Vasco da Gama invoked his royal letter and took command of the armada. He set sail with 15 heavily armed ships and 800 men.

On 30 October 1502, Vasco da Gama landed in Calicut on the Malabar coast for the second time. This time he had come in war. He came to seek revenge for the treatment meted out to Pedro Álvares Cabral who had come to Calicut earlier.

After the fleet of Vasco da Gama reunited with 6 caravels of the patrol fleet of Vicente Sodré, the Portuguese inflicted a heavy defeat on Calicut. In one of the first recorded instances of a naval line of battle, Gama's naus and caravels sailed in a line end-to-end, concentrating all their immense firepower as they passed against the twenty large Arab ships of Cojambar, before they could get organized, sinking a number of them and doing immense damage to the remainder.

== See also ==
- Portuguese battles in the Indian Ocean
- Portuguese India
