= Zimba (East Africa) =

16th-century term for East African groups

Zimba was a term used by 16th-century Portuguese records to refer to militaristic African groups, and is also found in some Zambezian oral traditions. The term was variously applied to a mercenary group used by Lundu of the Maravi Empire which defeated the Portuguese twice in the 1590s, and a group that attacked the Swahili city-states of Kilwa, Mombasa, and Malindi, which also accordingly intervened decisively against the Ottomans in the 1589 Battle of Mombasa. Scholars have varying interpretations of how connected the aforementioned events were.

== History ==
The origins and motivations of the 'Zimba' associated with Maravi ruler/title Lundu have been debated by historians. They are thought to have been Shona-speakers who migrated north from the south bank of the Lower Zambezi to the Shire Valley, due to the name Zimba being associated with groups near Sena, and religious practices surrounding Zimba leader and mhondoro Tondo/Tundu associating him with the south. The Zimba are most often thought to have constituted a mercenary army which was employed in the late-16th century by Lundu, who Matthew Schoffeleers equated with Tondo. Lundu accordingly used them to expand his control over the Shire Valley, including control over production and trade, as well as over rainmaking cults such as Mbona. With the help of the Zimba, Lundu conquered the Lolo and Makua.

Joseph Miller considered events involving 'Zimba' to be unconnected, due to the name Zimba having been used by Portuguese records to refer to any militaristic group (including the Jaga), though some scholars connect the following events to Lundu's Zimba. According to Malyn Newitt, in 1585, Zimba reached the Swahili coast and attacked the coast near the Quirimbas Islands, and in 1588 they sacked Kilwa. João dos Santos' Ethiopia Oriental (1609) described the Zimba as cannibals who "killed and ate 3000 people captured on [Kilwa]", though scholars have generally not taken this seriously; Malyn Newitt wrote that this may have been created by dos Santos to entertain his readers, while Eric Allina says that dos Santos may have taken African accounts literally which used cannibalism as a popular metaphor for political power and war.

During the Ottoman–Portuguese conflicts of the 1580s in which the Ottomans sought to expel the Portuguese from the Swahili coast, Ottoman corsair Mir Ali arrived at Mombasa and fortified it with local assistance, installing artillery which greatly threatened the Portuguese fleet despite its large size. However before the Battle of Mombasa could commence, dos Santos wrote that Mir Ali's forces were attacked by "20,000 Zimba cannibals" armed with spears and poison darts, causing them to refocus some of their artillery on the 'Zimba'. When the Portuguese fleet arrived, they forced the Ottomans out of Mombasa. Dos Santos continues that the 'Zimba' chief coordinated with the Portuguese, and the 'Zimba' then drove the Ottomans and their allies from the interior to the shore. Most scholars regard dos Santos' depiction of the 'Zimba' involved in the battle as fanciful, and Giancarlo Casale says that all that can be assumed is that an African group intervened decisively in the Battle of Mombasa. He speculates that they may have been Lundu's mercenaries employed by a rival anti-Portuguese Mombasan faction, Maravi warriors displaced by Muslims, or a local group sympathetic to the Portuguese.

Following the Battle of Mombasa, according to dos Santos the 'Zimba' next attacked Malindi, which was guarded by the Portuguese. Dos Santos wrote that just as the 'Zimba' were about to take control of a rampart, a Segeju force of 3000 men intervened, and the 'Zimba' were strongly defeated. Eric Allina says that only the chief and 100 men returned to Sena.

In 1592, 'Zimba' thought to have been Lundu's mercenaries conquered an African chief on the Zambezi opposite Sena who was allied to the Portuguese. Before the Portuguese army could arrive, the Zimba constructed a fort with two concentric wooden palisades and a surrounding trench. The Portuguese army called for reinforcements with firearms, though these were ambushed and killed by the Zimba a few kilometres from the fort. Upon learning of this, the Portuguese army attempted to retreat, though were killed by the Zimba, who went on to attack Sena and Tete, greatly threatening Portuguese presence along the Zambezi and their control of trade. In 1593, a Portuguese general led an army accompanied by artillery against the Zimba's fort, though the Zimba fended them off as the artillery proved ineffective against the newly-built earthen walls. After two months of assaulting the fort, the Portuguese decided to retreat, though the Zimba caught and killed some of them and seized some artillery. Lundu's Zimba are known to have reached the east coast in 1595. Despite the strength of the Zimba's position, in 1599 'Tundu' (Lundu) offered the Portuguese peace, which was accepted.
