= Battle of Benadir =

1542 battle

- Part of Somali–Portuguese conflicts
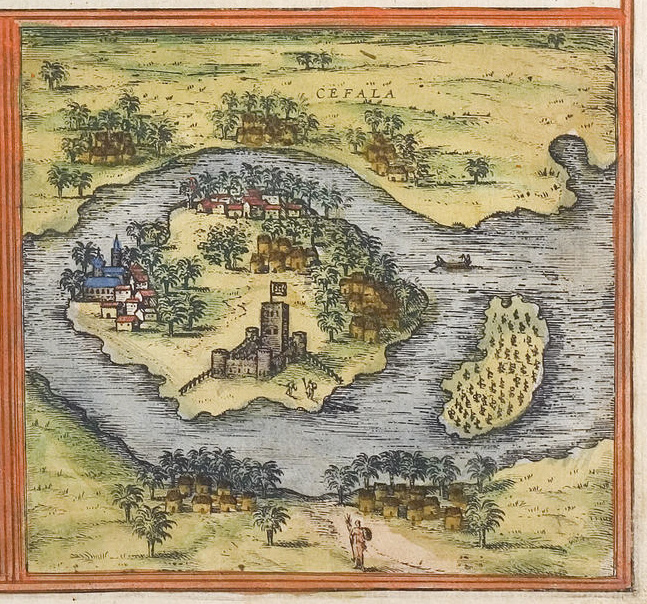
- Portuguese fortress of Sofala
Date	1542
Location	Benadir, Somalia
Result	Peace treaty

Belligerents
Ajuran Sultanate	Portuguese Empire

Commanders and leaders
Unknown	João de Sepúlveda

Strength
Unknown	100 soldiers 6 galleys

The Battle of Benadir was an armed engagement between the Ajuran Sultanate and the Portuguese Empire.

== Historical precedent ==
After Tristão da Cunha and Afonso de Albuquerque sacked the city of Barawa during the Battle of Barawa, Cunha then steered for Mogadishu. Wanting to do the same as had done at Barawa, he sent Leonez Coutign with offer of peace and friendship to the people of Mogadishu. The people at Mogadishu made a formidable appearance: Great numbers of foot and cuirassiers were patrolling on the shore, the walls of the city were lined with armed men and a considerable body of troops were drawn up before it. Tristão da Cunha, being afraid to land, sent one of the Bravan captives to let the people know, that the Portuguese came not to wage war but to offer peace.

In front of Cunha they tore the captive to pieces and threatened to serve Cunha in the same manner, if he could dare to come ashore.

Cunha was for storming the city, but at the persuasion of all of his officers and Pilots, he dropped the resolution.

The place was almost inaccessible, strong by its natural situation, and defended by a numerous garrison: the station for our ships extremely dangerous, and very much exposed to the enemy: besides the winter was fast approaching, and the season for sailing almost elapsed, so that if our people should have miscarried in this attempt, their fleet and army would in all probability have met with inevitable destruction. Tristão da Cunha

== Background ==
After the Portuguese conducted a large-scale naval expedition to Suez in 1541, the Ottoman Empire dedicated greater resources into protecting the Red Sea from Portuguese intrusion. To such effect, about 25 galleys were armed and stationed at Aden.

The Portuguese captain of Sofala, João de Sepúlveda, was informed of the presence of these forces by allied Swahili city-states, mainly Malindi, who also reported that the hostile Ajuran Sultanate had appealed to the Ottomans for military support, in preparation for a rebellion against Portuguese suzerainty in the region. João de Sepúlveda thus set out with 6 small galleys and 100 soldiers to conduct a preemptive strike against the coastal cities of the Ajuran Sultanate. He was joined by an unrecorded number of vessels and warriors from Malindi.

== Battle ==
According to João de Sepúlveda's own account, having arrived at Mogadishu he "destroyed the city and did them great damage and injury". Moving a few leagues north, he reached a popular anchorage for tradeships coming from the Red Sea, where he learned that the Turks would not be sailing to East Africa that year. Thus he returned to what remained of Mogadishu, and made a peace deal with its rulers.

However, according to modern historians it's not likely that João de Sepúlveda's small fleet actually destroyed Mogadishu. Instead, it appears that the capture of one Ottoman ship and a brief firing upon the city was enough to compel the sultan of Mogadishu to sign a peace deal with the Portuguese.

Passing by Barawa, the city was sacked, in retaliation for its inhabitants having delivered a few Portuguese prisoners to the Turks. After also sealing a peace with Barawa, João de Sepúlveda returned to Malindi.

== See also ==
- Battle of Barawa
- Ajuran Sultanate
- History of Somalia
