= Attack on Jailolo =

Battle in Jailolo, 16th century

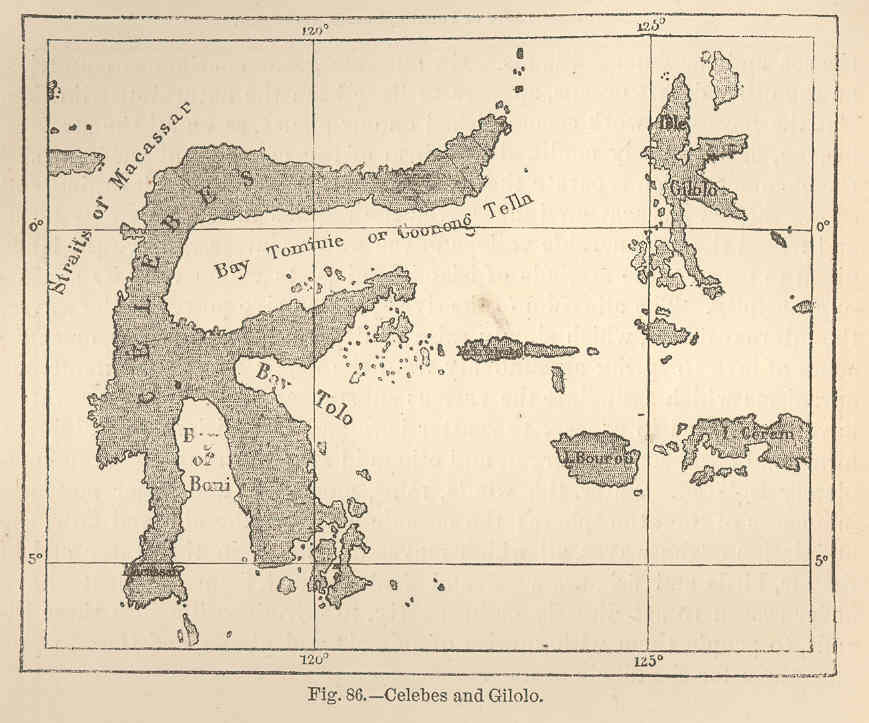
- Map of Gilolo Island
Date	Late November 1545
Location	Jailolo (town), Halmahera, Moluccas
Result	Jailoloan victory

Belligerents
Portuguese Empire; Spanish Empire; Sultanate of Ternate	Sultanate of Jailolo

Commanders and leaders
Fernao de Sousa de Tavora; Ruy López de Villalobos; Pati Sarang	Katarabumi

Strength
300; 100; 1,500	Unknown

Casualties and losses
1,300 killed or captured	600 killed and captured

The Attack on Jailolo was a military expedition launched by the combined force of Spanish-Portuguese and Ternatean armies to oust the ruler of Jailolo. The attack failed.

== Background ==
In 1534, the new sultan of the Sultanate of Jailolo named Katarabumi took over. He had the previous sultan poisoned and died in a Portuguese hospital in Ternate. In his proclamation, Katarabumi said he would rule Jailolo on behalf of the Portuguese king. During his reign, he began attacking Ternatean territory in Jailolo and succeeded in expelling them; he also began attacking Moro Kingdom a Christianized kingdom, which led to suspicion of the Portuguese and did not expect an emerging power.

Katarabumi's pro-Portuguese statements were just a ruse to cover up his attacks on Christian missionaries in the Moro kingdom. In 1536, He invaded the capital of the Moro kingdom, Mamuya. After a siege for a week, Katarabumi demanded the king Tioliza surrender in the next 24 hours. He also demanded the Portuguese guards surrender; the guards escaped the capital but were killed by locals. He then invaded Tolo, a village of 3,000 inhabitants supported by Portuguese soldiers, who resisted Katarabumi for a month before surrendering.

== Attack ==
Having done a lot of harm to the Portuguese, in late November 1545, the Portuguese captain, Fernao de Sousa de Tavora, led an expedition of 300 Portuguese. They were joined by 100 Spanish troops led by Ruy López de Villalobos, and 1,500 Ternateans led by Pati Sarang. The allied forces arrived at the fort of Jailolo and found it strongly fortified. A ditch and a wooden palisade with towers of artillery arquebusiers enclosed the city. The Allied forces launched an assault on the fort. However, the Jailoloans were prepared for the attack and repulsed them with heavy losses. The jailoloans also made repeated sorties against the enemy; the fighting lasted for two days or weeks. The Portuguese commanders were divided among themselves, and some withdrew, which made them lift the siege.

== Aftermath ==
The Spanish and Portuguese forces retired and returned to Ternate, where Villalobos died. De Sousa afterwards went to India, accompanied by the remainder of the Spaniards. The Jailoloans became overconfident at the victory, and Katarabumi sent caracoas to Ternate and Tidore to swindle the inhabitants. The success of Katarabumi didn't last long; in 1550, a force of 180 Portuguese and 5,000 Ternateans successfully captured Jailolo.
