= Battle of Barawa =

1507 battle between the Portuguese Empire and the Ajuran Sultanate

- Part of the Somali–Portuguese conflicts
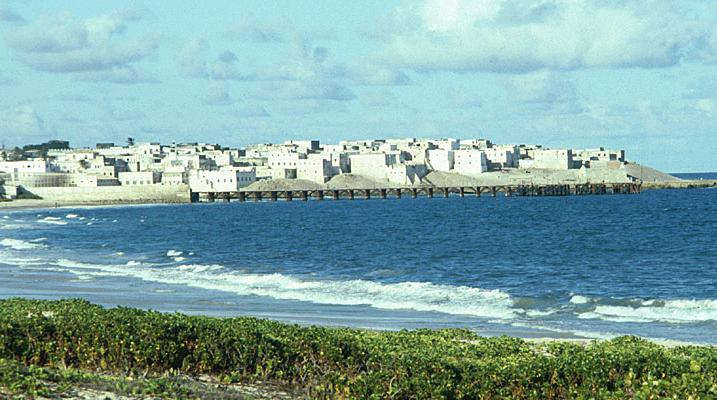
- Modern-day Barawa
Date	April 1507
Location	Barawa, Somalia 1°06′48″N 44°01′49″E
Result	Portuguese victory

Belligerents
Ajuran Sultanate	(Portugal) Portuguese Empire

Commanders and leaders
Unknown	(Portugal) Tristão da Cunha (WIA) (Portugal) Afonso de Albuquerque

Strength
4,000	1,500

Casualties and losses
Heavy	50 killed

The Battle of Barawa was an armed military encounter between the Portuguese Empire and the Ajuran Sultanate, in the city of Barawa. The Portuguese staged a landing and achieved their objectives of sacking the city.

== Battle ==
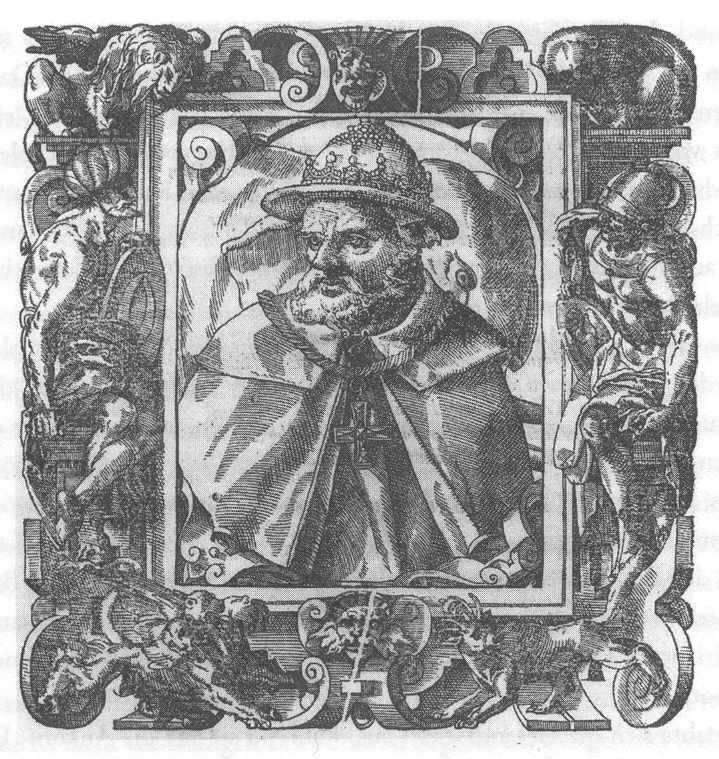
During the Battle of Barawa, Tristão da Cunha was wounded and knighted by Afonso de Albuquerque.

In February 1507, an armada of 16 ships commanded by Tristão da Cunha and assisted by Afonso de Albuquerque docked at Malindi, en route to India via the island of Socotra. The King of Malindi had been a faithful vassal of the Portuguese since the maiden voyage of Vasco da Gama to India in 1497, and at that instance, the King requested assistance from the Portuguese against the hostile cities of Oja, Lamu and Barawa. Oja was sacked and Lamu was subjugated without a fight.

Upon reaching Barawa, the Portuguese first sent an ambassador called Leonel Coutinho, and offered the city the chance to submit without a fight, which was refused. The Portuguese made ready to assault the city, and reported that its defences included a well fortified wall and a garrison of 4,000 men ready to fight.

The following morning, Tristão da Cunha and Afonso de Albuquerque led two assault groups ashore: the first consisting of 900 men and the other consisting of 600 soldiers, respectively. Of those 4,000 men, 2,000 sallied forth to fight the Portuguese on the beach, but were driven back to the city. Immediately the Portuguese surrounded the city, examining with the utmost carefulness where they could force an entrance. Coming under attack from flaming arrows, the Portuguese scaled the wall at a weak point discovered by Afonso de Albuquerque and the defenses were breached. Many inhabitants fled, but those who remained perished in the fight. The city was then sacked and put to the torch, while the survivors watched from afar. Afterwards the Portuguese proceeded to Mogadishu and then to Socotra.

== See also ==
- Capture of Ormuz (1507)
- Battle of Benadir
- History of Somalia
