= Ottoman–Portuguese conflicts (1586–1589) =

2nd military encounter between Portuguese and Ottoman Empire

- Part of the Ottoman–Portuguese confrontations
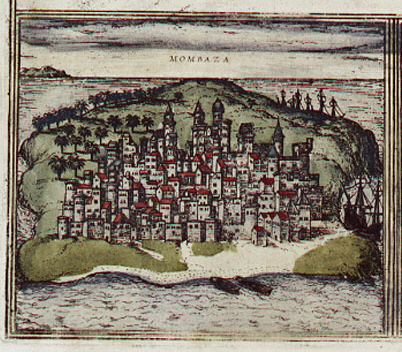
- 16th century depiction of Mombasa
Date	1586–1589 (3 years)
Location	East African coast
Result	Portuguese victory

Belligerents
Portuguese Empire; Malindi; Zimbas	Ottoman Empire; Ajuran Sultanate; Mogadishu; Barawa; Lamu; Pate; Faza; Mombasa; Pemba

Commanders and leaders
(Portuguese Empire) Ruy Gonçalves da Câmara (Portuguese Empire) Martim Afonso de Melo (Portuguese Empire) Tomé de Sousa Coutinho (Portuguese Empire) Mateus de Vasconcelos	Mir Ali Beg (POW)

Casualties and losses
Few; 3 ships	70 dead 230 (POW)

The Ottoman–Portuguese Conflicts (1586–1589) were armed military engagements which took place between the Portuguese Empire and the Ottoman Empire along the coast of eastern Africa.

== Expedition of Ruy Gonçalves da Câmara to the Red Sea, 1586 ==
In the fall of 1585 the Portuguese dispatched a fleet to south Arabia with instructions to attack Muslim shipping. This was led by Ruy Gonçalves da Câmara and was the first serious attempt by the Portuguese to restrict access to the Red Sea in more than a decade. Furthermore, the fleet, numbering 26 vessels was one of the largest naval force sent to the region by the Portuguese.

While anchored at a bay 30 miles south of Mokha, Rui Gonçalves landed a scouting party of 70 men to fetch water for the fleet, but it was attacked by a force of 2,000 Turkish horsemen from Mokha and forced to reembark the following day, having suffered five or six dead. The Portuguese also lost one of their vessels in the coastal ambush. This was later reported by Ottoman authorities as a major victory.

Despite the numerical strength of the Portuguese fleet, Ruy Gonçalves da Câmara failed to catch any ship in four months and withdrew to Muscat, afflicted by thirst in 1586. The failed attack on the Red Sea discouraged the Portuguese from launching more expeditions as demonstrated in Philip II's letter to the Viceroy of Goa:

Since in these parts [i.e. Europe] there are many affairs deserving of attention, it will from now on be necessary for you to preserve the gains that have already been made rather than seek out new ventures. Keep in mind that offensive wars have many disadvantages, as has been demonstrated by the armada which you sent under Ruy Gonsalves da Camara to the Red Sea which, far from resulting in any of the successes that had been hoped for, served only to provoke the Turks at great and unprofitable expense and with much discredit to the state.

Despite Câmaras poor results, the Ottoman governor of Yemen Hasan Pasha and his allies dispatched numerous reports in the early months of 1586 greatly overestimating the threat of the Portuguese, in a bid to secure more funding. Panic followed at Istanbul and in the middle of a rumour-induced hysteria the sultan appointed Hazinedar Sinan, a political ally of Hasan Pasha, as the new governor of Egypt to deal with the threat, with authorization to build a new galley fleet and even a canal linking the Mediterranean to the Red Sea. His first report was to claim that the Portuguese had cut-off all trade with the Red Sea, were building a permanent base in Socotra and preparing for a naval assault on Jeddah and the Holy Cities. Meanwhile, the French ambassador in Venice collected reports that the Portuguese had supposedly looted the entire Red Sea coast as far as El Tor and he implied that they were planning to return the following year to occupy Aden. According to Venetian envoys in Instabul, the Portuguese were also believed to have fortified Kamaran island. At the same time, Hasan Pasha and Hazinedar Sinan both suppressed information about the success of an Ottoman expedition to East Africa, led by the privateer Mir Ali Beg.

== Expedition of Mir Ali Beg to East Africa, 1586 ==
In January 1586, a Turkish privateer named Mir Ali Beg sailed from Mokha in Yemen to the Horn of Africa, intending to disrupt Portuguese shipping in the region. He began informing the Sultan that the naval forces of the Ottoman Empire in the Indian Ocean were unable to protect against Portuguese expansion. Consequently, Sultan Murad III sent Mir Ali down with two other ships that were tasked with defending the Swahili coast. Additionally, Mir Ali Beg convinced the inhabitants of Mogadishu to join the fight against the Portuguese, and thus was joined by a few local vessels in support of his endeavors. The people of Barawa and Faza also declared their allegiance to the Ottoman Empire and, in the end, Mir Ali Beg had about 15 vessels. At Pate, Mir Ali Beg captured a Portuguese merchant carrack. At Lamu, Mir Ali Beg captured a small galley belonging to Roque de Brito Falcão, while the king of Lamu delivered his city's Portuguese refugees to the Turks. Mir Ali Beg also established a fort at Mombasa.

Setting sail back to Mokha, Mir Ali Beg captured another Portuguese carrack in Pate that had just arrived from Chaul, promising their passengers their freedom in exchange for their cargo—a promise which Mir Ali Beg did not keep, resulting in the passengers' enslavement. Mir Ali Beg returned to Mokha with about 20 vessels and 100 Portuguese refugees, who were later ransomed.

== East African campaign, 1587 ==
When news reached Goa that a Turkish fleet was in East Africa inciting cities to rebel and raid Portuguese ships with Ottoman support, the Portuguese reacted swiftly. In January 1587, the Portuguese viceroy, Dom Duarte de Meneses, dispatched a fleet of 2 galleons, 3 galleys, 13 light-galleys, and 650 soldiers under the command of Martim Afonso de Melo to expel the Turks and reestablish Portuguese authority along the coast.

The King of Faza mobilized 4,000 warriors but he was killed in action and the city was sacked. Pate resubmitted. An indemnity of 4,000 cruzados was extracted from Mombasa in exchange for not destroying the city. At the same time, de Melo arrived at Malindi, whose king had remained loyal to the Portuguese, and reinforced their diplomatic ties.

Ultimately finding no sign of Mir Ali Beg, the Portuguese fleet returned to Goa via Socotra and Ormus.

== Expedition of Mir Ali Beg to East Africa, 1588 ==
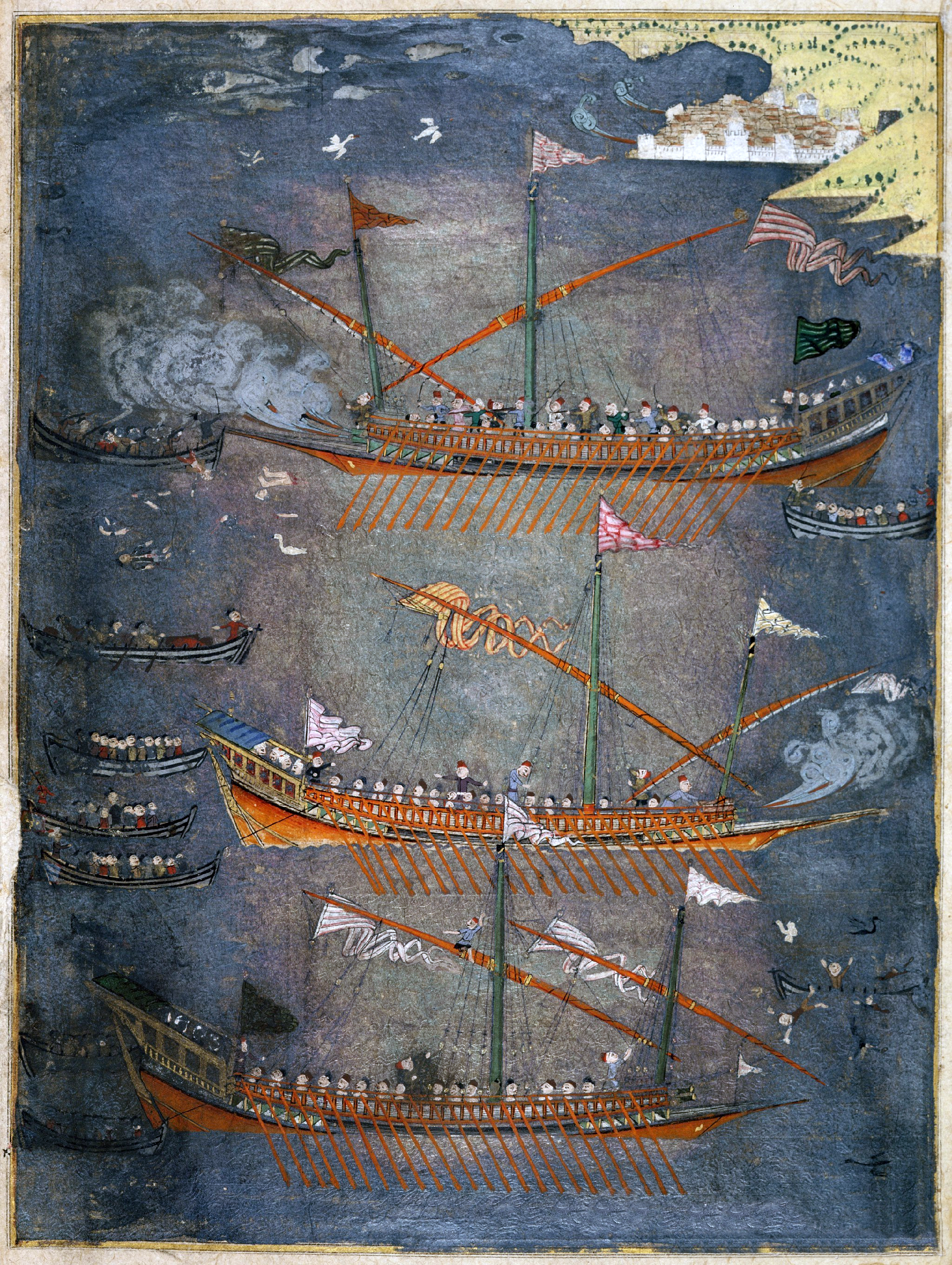
Turkish galleys, 17th century

In the summer of 1588, Mir Ali Beg set sail from Mokha with a fleet of 5 oarships. Calling first at Mogadishu, Mir Ali Beg now extracted a heavy tribute from the cities along the coast in exchange for protection, in the name of the Ottoman Empire. From there he proceeded to Malindi, a loyal vassal of the Portuguese, hoping to sack it.

However, the Portuguese captain of the east-African coast Mateus Mendes de Vasconcelos, was at Malindi with a small force, and was already well aware of the approach of Mir Ali Beg: a network of spies and informants within the Red Sea itself kept the Portuguese up to date on Turkish movements. Approaching Malindi by night, the flotilla of Mir Ali Beg was bombarded by a Portuguese artillery battery, and so it sailed away to Mombasa.

The Ottomans would attempt to conquer Pate and Mombasa from the Portuguese in this year, but were defeated four times.

== Portuguese campaign to East Africa, 1589 ==
Before Mir Ali Beg had even set sail, already Vasconcelos had dispatched a vessel to Goa informing the viceroy that the Turks were about to leave the Red Sea.

From India, governor Manuel de Sousa Coutinho dispatched an armada of 2 galleons, 5 galleys, 6 half-galleys, and 6 light-galleys with 900 Portuguese soldiers, commanded by his brother Tomé de Sousa Coutinho. In late February 1589 the fleet reached the east-African coast, and calling at Lamu, they learnt from an envoy of de Vasconcelos that Mir Ali Beg had established a stronghold at Mombasa. At Malindi, they were joined by de Vasconcelos with another half-galley and two light-galleys from Malindi.

=== Battle of Mombasa ===
Naval and war standard used by the Portuguese

On 5 March the Portuguese fleet reached the island of Mombasa. Mir Ali Beg had erected a small fort by the shoreline, close to the city, and armed it with artillery pieces to close off the entrance to the harbor. Nonetheless, the Portuguese pushed through under fire. Three Turkish galleys in the harbor were captured, the fort was bombarded from the sea by the galleys, and in face of superior firepower, the Turks abandoned the fort. The Portuguese captured 30 guns in this action, while 70 Turks perished. On 7 March the Portuguese landed 500 troops, only to learn that Mombasa had been evacuated, and its inhabitants had taken shelter in a nearby wood, along with the Turks.

At that time, by pure chance, a marauding cannibalistic tribe called the Zimbas was migrating north and had set up a camp just across the channel. The last two of Mir Ali Beg's galleys prevented them from crossing onto the island. They were attacked and captured by the Portuguese. Wishing to capture Mir Ali Beg and the rest of the Turks, de Sousa Coutinho gave permission to the Zimbas to cross over - once the people of Mombasa realized the Zimbas had invaded the island, they promptly rushed to the beaches in desperation to be taken aboard the ships. Many drowned, but among the people the Portuguese captured was Mir Ali Beg.

== Aftermath ==
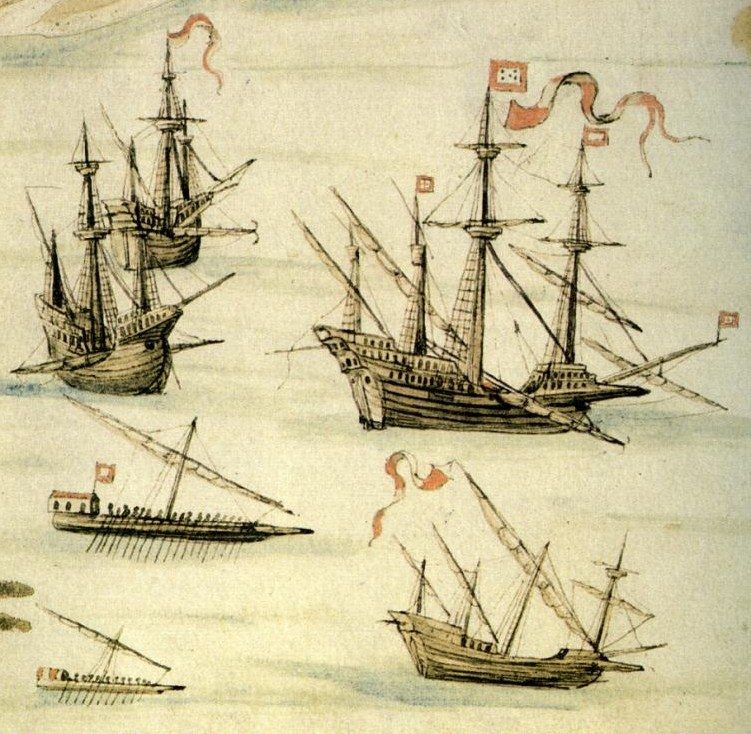
Portuguese galleons, carracks, and oarships depicted by Dom João de Castro in 1540.

On 24 March, the Portuguese fleet reached Malindi, where they were triumphantly met with celebrations and long festivities.

With Mir Ali Beg captured, all that remained was to reestablish Portuguese suzerainty over the entire coast, through diplomacy or force of arms. The King of Malindi was amply rewarded for his valiant loyalty to the Portuguese Crown. The Portuguese captain of the East African coast, Mateus Mendes de Vasconcelos, was detached with a squadron to remain at Malindi and defend it from the marauding Zimbas. The King of Pemba, who was loyal to the Portuguese but was ousted by Ottoman-backed rebels, was reestablished on his throne. The King of Lamu, on the other hand, was captured and publicly beheaded. Pate was sacked.

Mir Ali Beg was taken prisoner, but treated with honor and sent to meet Dom de Sousa Coutinho, the Portuguese viceroy of India. Later he was sent to Portugal where he converted to Christianity.

Analyzing the conflict in detail, Czech historian Svat Soucek argued against the exaggeration of the capacity of the Ottoman Empire to expand their influence in the Indian Ocean by certain authors: Mir Ali Beg only managed to pass undetected by the Portuguese intelligence network due to the insignificance of his initial single galley; once he was detected, a Portuguese war fleet was swiftly dispatched to neutralize the threat.

The Swahili coast remained well within the Portuguese sphere of influence until the late 17th century.

Without Portuguese intervention in these skirmishes along the Horn of Africa, the Ottoman Empire's hold on the region might have tightened dramatically.

== See also ==
- Abyssinian-Adal War
- Swahili Coast
- History of Portugal
- History of the Ottoman Empire
- Military history of Portugal
- Military of the Ottoman Empire
- Ottoman–Portuguese conflicts (1538–1560)
- Interregional caravan trade in East Africa

== Sources ==
- Attila and Balázs Weiszhár: Lexicon of War (Háborúk lexikona), Athenaum publisher, Budapest 2004.
- Britannica Hungarica, Hungarian encyclopedia, Hungarian World publisher, Budapest 1994.
- Dejanirah Couto, Rui Loureiro, Revisiting Hormuz: Portuguese Interactions in the Persian Gulf Region in the Early Modern Period (2008) ISBN 9783447057318
