= Battle of Calicut (1752) =

1752 naval battle

- Part of Portuguese battles in the East
Date	11 December 1752
Location	Calicut
Result	Portuguese victory

Belligerents
(Portugal) Portuguese Empire	Maratha Empire

Commanders and leaders
(Portugal) João de Melo Saraiva	Unknown

Strength
1 ship of the line (East Indiaman)	3 Grabs; 7 Pals; 11 Gallivats

Casualties and losses
Few	Heavy

The Battle of Calicut took place between the Portuguese ship of the line Nossa Senhora da Misericórdia, commanded by João de Melo Saraiva and 21 Maratha ships that attempted to conquer the city of Calicut. The Portuguese were victorious and managed to make the Marathas retreat.
