= Nuno da Cunha =

Portuguese colonial administrator

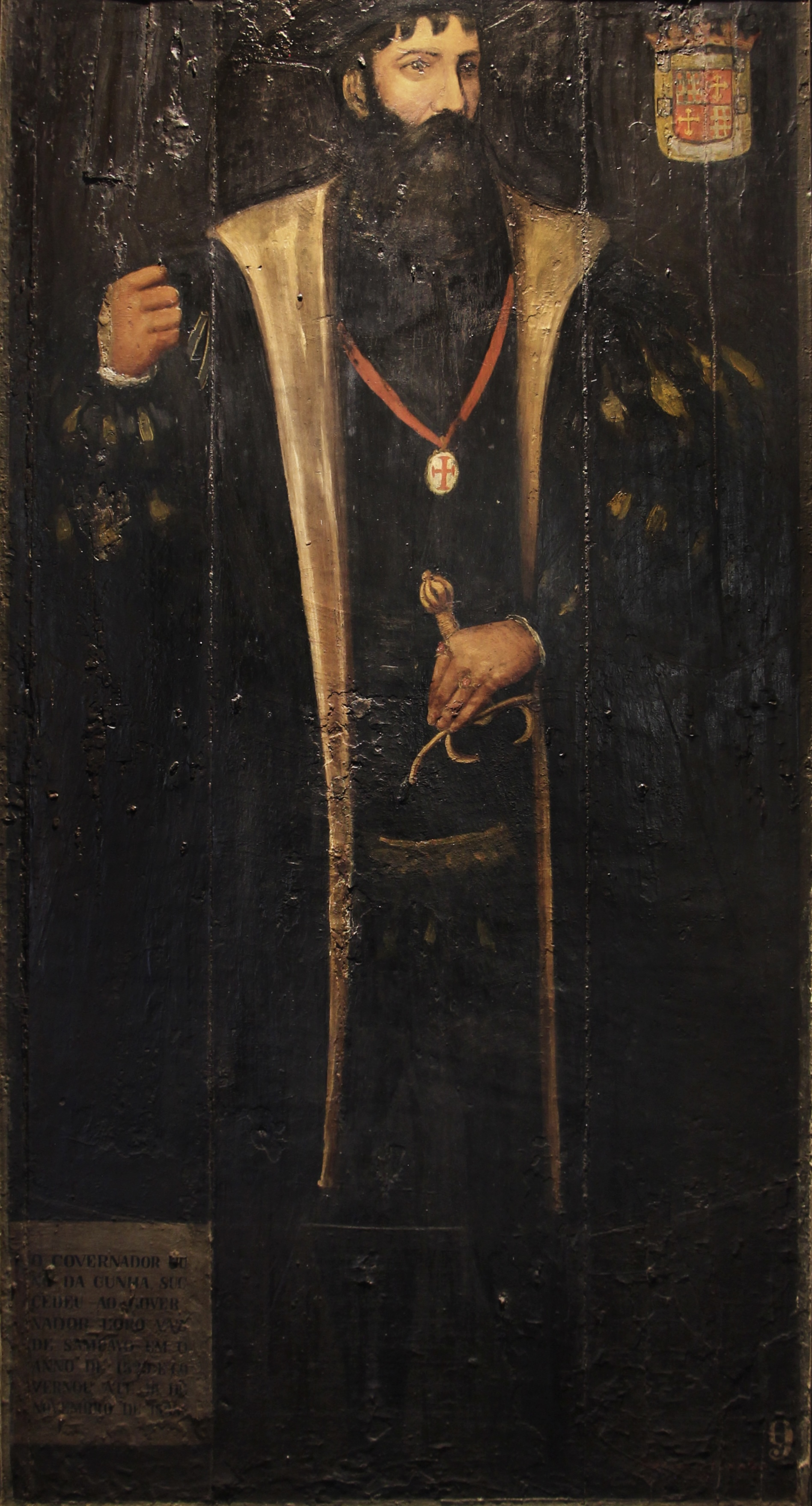

Governor of India
- In office 1529–1538
- Monarch: John III
- Preceded by: Lopo Vaz de Sampaio
- Succeeded by: Garcia de Noronha

Personal details
- Born: c. 1487 Kingdom of Portugal
- Died: 5 March 1539 Cape of Good Hope
- Spouse(s): Maria da Cunha; Isabel da Silveira

Nuno da Cunha (c. 1487 – 5 March 1539) was a Portuguese admiral who was governor of Portuguese possessions in India from 1529 to 1538. He was the governor of Portuguese Asia who ruled for the longest time in the sixteenth century; a total of nine years. He was the son of Antónia Pais and Tristão da Cunha, the famous Portuguese navigator, admiral and ambassador to Pope Leo X. Nuno da Cunha proved his mettle in battles at Oja and Brava, and at the capture of Panane, under the viceroy Francisco de Almeida. Named by João III ninth governor of Portuguese possessions in India, he served from April 1529 to 1538. He was named to end the government of governor Lopo Vaz de Sampaio (1526–1529) and brought orders, by King John III of Portugal, to send Sampaio in chains for Portugal. This delicate mission by the King was justified by their close connection ever since the king was still a prince.

On his passage to Goa, he subdued the pirates at Mombasa who had been harassing the coast of Portuguese Mozambique. Mozambique had been brought within the Portuguese trading orbit and provided watering stations essential to Portugal's lifeline to the west coast of India. Nuno's brothers Pero Vaz da Cunha and Simão da Cunha were expected to serve under him as second and third in command, a form of nepotism that was expected in the Portuguese Estado da Índia. However, they died on the voyage, and Nuno was forced to rely upon local networks of clientage in Goa during his long rule.

In 1529, Nuno sent an expedition that sacked and burned the city of Damão on the Arabian Sea at the mouth of the Damão River, about 100 miles north of Mumbai in the Muslim state of Gujarat. Forces under his control captured Baxay (now Vasai, often mistaken for Basra in Iraq) from the Muslim ruler of Gujarat, Bahadur Shah, on 20 January 1533. The next year, renamed Bassein, the city became the capital of the Portuguese province of the North, and the great citadel of black basalt, still standing, was begun. (It was completed in 1548.)It was during his time that the siege of Diu occurred when an army of the Sultanate of Gujarat under Khadjar Safar, aided by forces of the Ottoman Empire, attempted to capture the city of Diu in 1538, then held by the Portuguese.

Forced to return to Portugal as a result of court intrigues, he was shipwrecked at the Cape of Good Hope and drowned. His first marriage was to Maria da Cunha, and his second marriage was to Isabel da Silveira. The main source for Nuno da Cunha's career is the Portuguese historian João de Barros (1496–1570), famous for his history of the Portuguese in their overseas territories. The work, Asia de Ioam de Barros, dos fectos que os Portuguezes fizeram no descobrimento e conquista dos mares e terras do Oriente, is full of lively detail, with incidents described like the king of Viantana's killing of the Portuguese ambassadors to Malacca with boiling water and their bodies thrown to dogs.

== Gallery ==
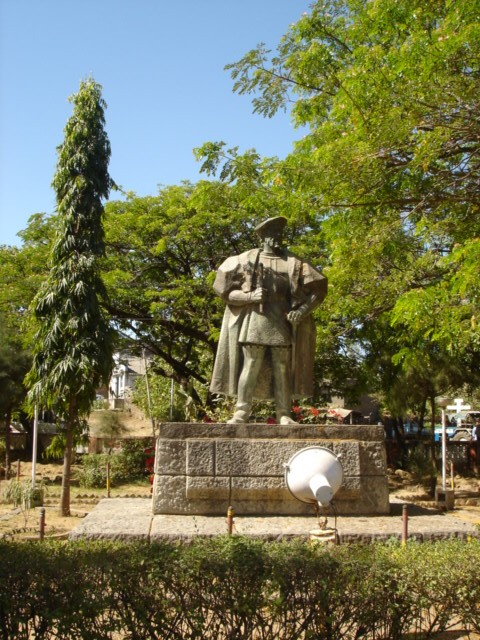
Statue of D. Nuno da Cunha in Diu.

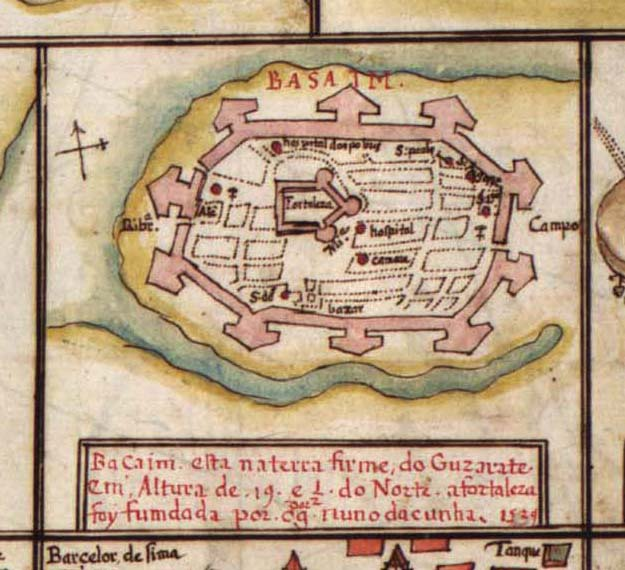
Map of Bassein (c. 1539).

== See also ==
- Gujarati-Portuguese conflicts
- Adil Shahi-Portuguese conflicts
