= Siege of Bahrain (1529) =

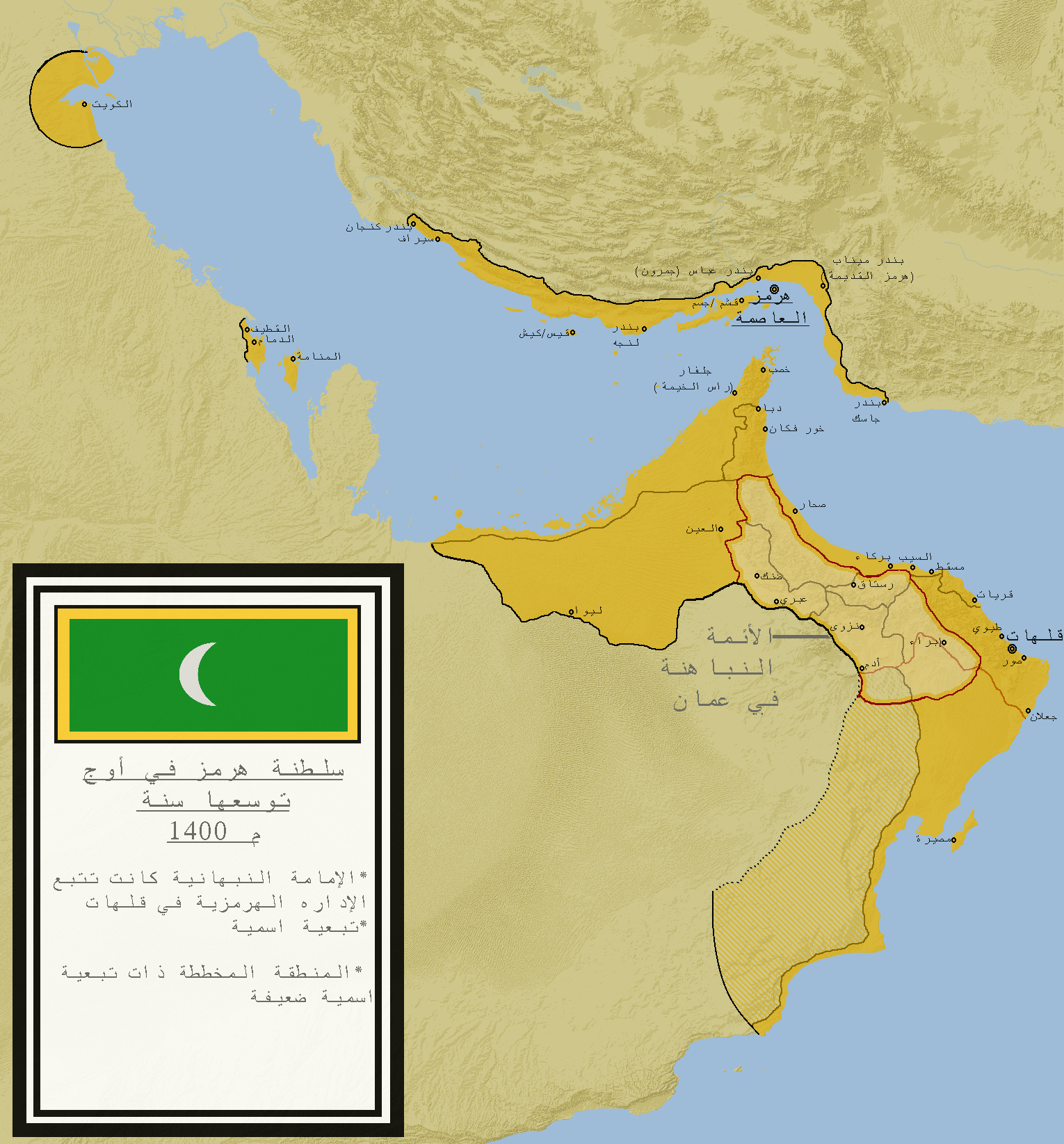
- Kingdom of Hormuz
Date	20 September – 4 October 1529
Location	Bahrain
Result	Bahraini victory

Belligerents
Portuguese Empire	Bahraini rebels

Commanders and leaders
Simao de Cunha	Badr al-Din

Strength
400 men 5 ships	800 men

Casualties and losses
200 died from disease	Unknown

The siege of Bahrain in 1529 was a military engagement between the Portuguese and the Bahrainian rebels who revolted against the Kingdom of Hormuz. The siege ended in a fiasco for the Portuguese.

== Prelude ==
The governor of Bahrain, Badr al-Din (Rex Badradim by Portuguese sources), openly revolted against Ormus, this was due to refusing to pay a tribute for the Ormus, who had raised the tribute from 10,000 Ashrafi to 60,000. The Bahrainis also massacred the Portuguese garrison to the last man and hanged the captain from a palm tree. The Ormus king then asked the Portuguese governor of India, Nuno da Cunha for help to subdue the rebels. Nuno answered his call.

== Siege ==
Nuno then dispatched his brother Simao de Cunha with a force of 400 men and 5 ships, they arrived in Bahrain on 20 September, and the rebels had 800 men, Badr al-Din refused to surrender. Simao then began bombarding the fort, however, little damage was done, he kept bombarding it until half of the gunpowder, Simao expected the fort to fall easily as he was told, Simao then ordered his men to land ashore alongside the cannons, there he again bombarded the fort until all the gunpowder was almost used, Simao then held a council to decide whether to assault the fortress by climbing its walls or ask help from Ormus, the council decided not to attack the fort until reinforcements arrive, they then dispatched a ship to Ormus, however, it didn't arrive after 14 days, during which a plague struck the Portuguese which killed 200 men and struck the rest, it is said only 50 remained were capable of fighting, the ship had finally arrived to Bahrain Simao then decided to re-embark. No one was able to carry the cannons to the ships; ropes were tied to the sick and dragged to the ships since they lacked sailors who were experienced at sea. A storm hit the ships, and they all sank except one; Simao died at sea by the plague.

== Bibliography ==
- Michael Rice, Bahrain Through The Ages, The History (2014).
- Mohammed Hameed Salman, Aspects Of Portuguese Rule In The Arabian Gulf, 1521–1622.
- Falih Handhal, Arab and Portuguese in History from 711 to 1720.
- Frederick Charles Danvers, The Portuguese In India, Vol I.
