= Manchua =

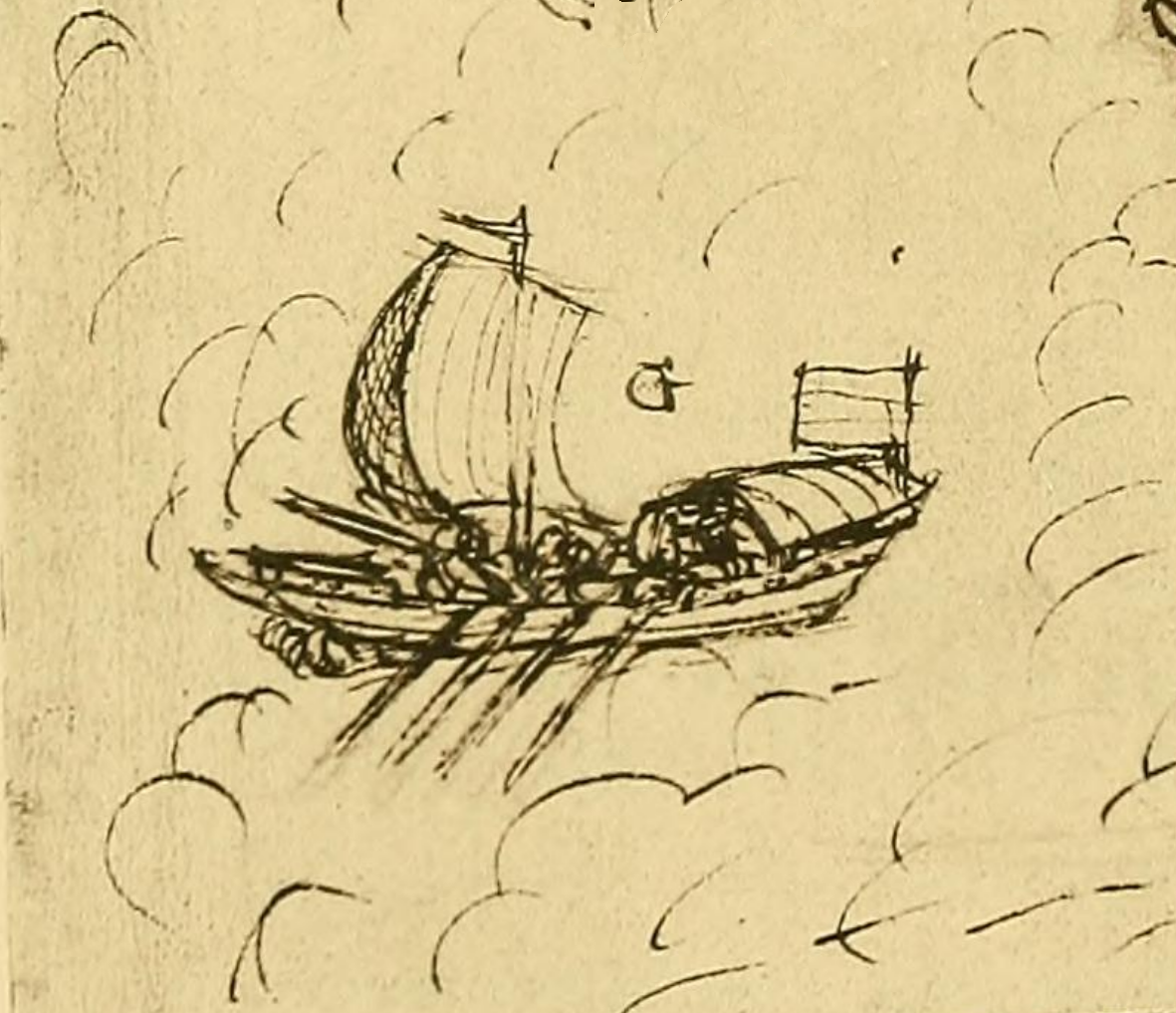
Illustration of a manchua from The Travels of Peter Mundy in Europe and Asia, 1608-1667

Manchua was a type of sailing vessel used from the eastern coast of Africa to the Malabar Coast, the Indian Ocean, and the East Indies.

== Description ==
The manchua was a square-sailed, single-masted, oared vessel, used for cargo transport in the Indian Ocean. It was used both by locals as well as by Portuguese traders. Typically a Malabar vessel, the term was also used for similar large cargo boats of Chinese origin. Traveler Peter Mundy sketched a manchua in his journals and described them as "small vessells of recreation, used by the Portugalls here, as allsoe att Goa, pretty handsome things resembling little Frigatts, Many curiously carved, guilded and painted, with little beake heads."

== Etymology ==
Also spelled munchua, monchew, munchew, or manchooa, Manchua is called "the Portuguese form" in Hobson-Jobson, which claims that "the original Malayālam word is manji, [manchi, Skt. maṇcha, 'a cot,' so called apparently from its raised platform for cargo]." It may also have originated with "native generic names for sea-going boats from Gujarat to Cochin," including "the machhwu, a fishing and also cargo-boat" and "the mahungiri, a large machhwu used for a trading boat," according to Carnac Temple. He also notes that the Portuguese used manchua "to represent the Cantonese term, man-shun, a sea-going trading vessel" as well as for other simimar vessels from Macau.

== History ==
First described in 1512, manchuas (and similar vessels described by the same term) were commonly recorded in the region through the 18th century. Clement Downing noted that in the early 18th century, the "town of Bombay was unwalled, and no Grabs or Frigates to protect any thing but the Fishery; except a small Munchew, which had escaped when Angria took the Company’s Yacht." Carpenter Richard Lazenby was abducted by pirates Seagar, England, Taylor, and Levasseur in 1720 and recorded the capture of one of these vessels in his journals: "They not liking to trust him being a stranger, resolved of seeking water at the Lacker Diva Islands, which they put for directly where they arrived in three days after. The same day of their arrival they took a small Monchew with the Governor of Carwar’s pass on board, who gave them an account that there was no anchor ground among the islands." The remains of two manchuas which sank during an attack on Mombasa in 1696-97 were tentatively identified by archaeological divers after a 2007 investigation.
