= Battle of Mombasa (1505) =

Battle of Mombasa 1505
- Part of the Portuguese Battles in the East
- "Assault on Mombasa", 1900 Portuguese depiction.
Date	15 August 1505
Location	Mombasa, east Africa
Result	Portuguese victory

Belligerents
Portuguese Empire	Mombasa Sultanate

Commanders and leaders
Dom Francisco de Almeida	Sultan of Mombasa

Strength
13 ships	Unknown

Casualties and losses
2 killed	Heavy

The Battle of Mombasa in 1505 was a military engagement between Portuguese forces under the command of the first Viceroy of India Dom Francisco de Almeida and the Sultanate of Mombasa. The Portuguese staged a landing and sacked the city on the occasion.

== Context ==
In 1505, king Manuel I of Portugal nominated Dom Francisco de Almeida as first Viceroy of India. He was tasked, among other things, with establishing a number of forts on the east African coast, namely at Sofala and Kilwa, and free Portuguese trade from opposition. Malindi was an ally of Portugal since Vasco da Gama visited the city, and was a rival of Mombasa, which was hostile towards the Portuguese. After having subdued Kilwa and left a fort with a garrison in the city, the Portuguese fleet sailed to Mombasa.

== The battle ==
The Portuguese reached the harbour of the city on August 13, 1505. The harbour was protected by a small fort or bulwark, connected to the city by a short wall, and armed with eight guns. The fort opened fire on the first Portuguese ship to enter the harbour to sound it, the São Rafael, captained by Gonçalo de Paiva. After being silenced by the fire from the fleet, its garrison made no attempts to further resist the Portuguese and instead retreated into the town.

The next day in the afternoon, the Portuguese sailed up the river to the city front, where they were shot with guns, bows and stones, and subjected the city to a naval bombardment. Dom Francisco messaged the sultan, but the ruler only replied with insolent taunts. Dom Francisco was met by a Spanish resident in Mombasa, a gunner by profession who had converted to Islam, and he told the Portuguese that "Mombasa was not like Kilwa: they would not find people with hearts that could be eaten like chickens as they had done in Kilwa, but that if they were keen to come ashore the people were ready to set about them for their supper."

The next day later they landed, divided in two squadrons and stormed the town. Despite heavy resistance and the very narrow streets, the Portuguese captured the settlement. The ruler of the town fled with many of its inhabitants to a nearby wood.

== Aftermath ==
The Portuguese captured valuable spoil left behind by its inhabitants. All the vessels found in the harbour were burned. The city was then torched. In this battle, the only son of Dom Francisco de Almeida, Dom Lourenço de Almeida distinguished himself. He would later in the year be the first Portuguese to contact Ceylon. The Portuguese sailed to Malindi, whose sultan was most pleased to hear of the sacking of the rival city.

== See also ==
- 7th Portuguese India Armada (Almeida, 1505)
