= Roccaguglielma =

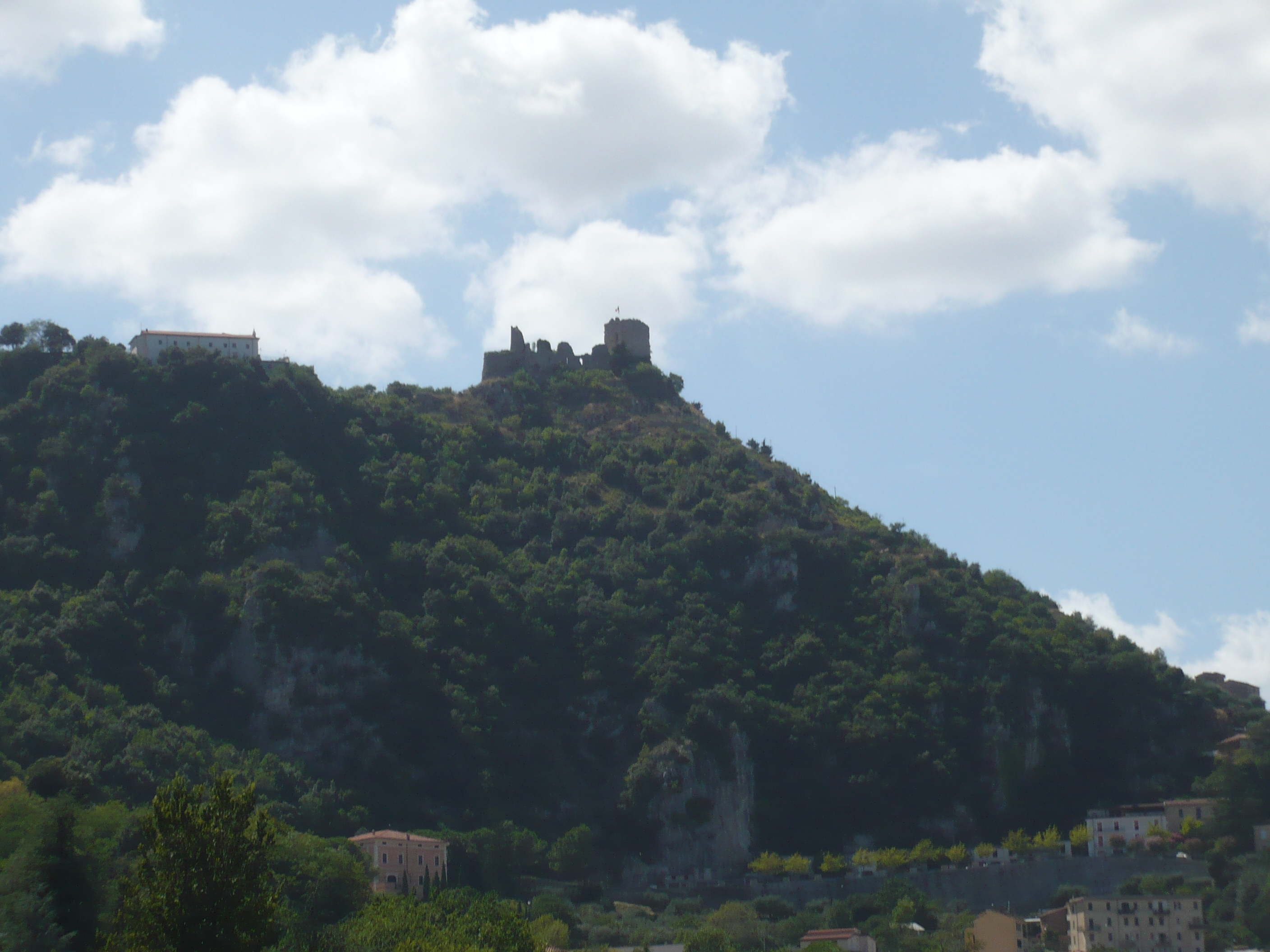
Roccaguglielma

Roccaguglielma is a medieval rocca fort which dominates the comune of Esperia, Lazio, Italy, and which once formed its historic town-centre of the former province of Terra di Lavoro.

It is now also known as Esperia superiore (Upper Esperia).
