= Mir Ali Beg (Ottoman corsair) =

Ottoman corsair

Mir Ali Beg was an Ottoman corsair (or buccaneer) in the late 16th century. Throughout the 1580s, Mir Ali Beg reportedly led several expeditions in the attempt of the Ottoman Empire to contest the Portuguese control of the Persian Gulf, Red Sea, and Indian Ocean down the Eastern Coast of Africa. He began this chain of expeditions in 1581, when he raided the Portuguese controlled city of Muscat, Oman, which appears to have been a resounding success. From there he would begin making his way down the Eastern African Coast, reaching the Kenyan city of Malindi by 1585. Ali Beg would return from his first expedition to the Swahili Coast in 1586 resoundingly successful, having "managed to secure the allegiance of every major Swahili port town except Malindi, to capture three fully laden Portuguese vessels, and to return safely to Mocha with some 150,000 cruzados of booty and nearly sixty Portuguese prisoners." However, the success of Mir Ali Beg's expeditions were widely kept a secret from the general Ottoman government, because three government members: Hasan Pasha, Kilich Ali Pasha, and Hazinedar Sinan Pasha, had hatched a conspiracy to gain more funding for naval expeditions by lying to the central government about an exaggerated Portuguese threat. Because news of Ali Beg's success would suggest that they were already in control of the sea, and thus would need no new funding, they kept it to themselves. However, this would come back to haunt them as in 1588 the Swahili people would arrive in Yemen requesting aid from the Portuguese fleet, and Hasan Pasha would have no credibility on which to ask for government funding or assistance, forcing him to send Mir Ali Beg back with just his same small fleet of five ships and 300 men. This would ultimately cost Ali Beg and the Ottomans, with his fleet being defeated in 1589 in Mombasa not only by the Portuguese but also a surprise third faction of supposed Zimba cannibals that ambushed them during battle. Mir Ali Beg would surrender to the Portuguese fleet and be taken captive along with much of his crew. He would then be sent to Goa and later Lisbon where he would convert to Christianity and live for the remainder of his life.

== First voyage to the Swahili coast ==
In 1583, Hasan Pasha exaggerated the significance of the arrest of a Spanish spy, and warned the Ottoman Sultan that the Ottoman defenses in the Indian Ocean were not adequate enough to ward off a Portuguese invasion. In response, Sultan Murad III sent 2 galleots from Suez to Yemen in order to aid in the defense. However, instead of using the ships for defense, Hasan Pasha gave them to Mir Ali Beg and sent the fleet to raid the Portuguese controlled Swahili coast, but also to establish connections with the local Muslim population and choose the location of a new Ottoman naval base for the Ottoman Navy which could be established for future raids and the eventual Ottoman conquest of the Swahili coast. However, on their way out of Yemen, one of the galleots had to turn back. Mir Ali Beg thus began his journey to the Swahili coast with a single galleot and 80 men.

The Portuguese were so unpopular among the local people that upon arriving in Mogadishu and explaining why he was visiting, the people of Mogadishu immediately declared allegiance to Murad III, contributed funding and 20 armed coastal ships as an escort to the expedition. Mir Ali received similarly enthusiastic support from his visits of other towns along the coast.

The Portuguese were unprepared for Mir Ali Beg's arrival. Ruy Lopes Salgado, the captain responsible for defending the Swahili coast, chose to hide in Malindi rather than attempt to stop the privateer. Mir Ali Beg had free rein of the coast. Shortly thereafter, he captured a merchant ship from Diu without a fight, and the people of Lamu turned over Captain-Major Roque de Brito and his warship, the crew of which he promptly replaced with Muslim volunteers, and used to capture another Portuguese ship.

Mir Ali Beg and his fleet spent the next month gaining support from the local Muslim people along the Swahili coast, and returned to Mokha with a fleet of 24 ships, plunder worth 150,000 gold cruzados (Portuguese currency), and 60 Portuguese captives.

== Battle of Mombasa ==
In the Spring of 1589, Mir Ali Beg arrived in Mombasa to prepare for the oncoming Portuguese attack. Because of his previous successful expedition to Mombasa, the locals were welcoming of him and his fleet and supported them in the preparations for the battle. Although Ali Beg only had five galleots and approximately 300 men under his control to combat the strong Portuguese fleet, he was also given a large amount of artillery to use on land. With the assistance of the locals, in just a few weeks he prepared his defense of the harbor which included a tower with artillery mounts, as well as his own fleet.

Though this was a strong defensive position for Mir Ali Beg, it was only so to an invasion from the sea. And while this was exactly what the Portuguese had planned to do, no one could have accounted for the surprise third party that ultimately decided the battle. Record says that on the day of the battle, up to 20,000 members of a supposed cannibal Zimba tribe ambushed Ali Beg's men and the town of Mombasa causing the battle to essentially be over by the time the Portuguese, led by commander Tomé De Souza Coutinho, arrived to the harbor. While the Ottomans would briefly attempt to fire at the Portuguese, they were so overwhelmed by the Zimba on land that they could do little to resist the Portuguese from simply overpowering the remainder of their fortifications. Mir Ali Beg would seek refuge inland for a couple of days while the Portuguese remained hesitant to leave the harbor, but that would change when the Zimba chief talked to the Portuguese commander and declared an alliance, prompting De Souza Coutinho to immediately head to capture Ali Beg and his men. The Zimba were still aiming to kill the Ottomans and Mombasans, and chased Ali Beg and his men all the way to the shore until he plunged into the sea to be taken captive by the Portuguese along with a small number of his men and Mombasans. Ali Beg appeared relieved to be captured by the Portuguese as opposed to the Zimba, saying, "I do not lament my adverse fortune, for such is the nature of war, and I would much rather be a captive of the Christians, as I was once before in Spain, than food for the barbarous and inhuman Zimba.”

After his defeat and subsequent capture in March 1589, Mir Ali Beg was taken to Lisbon where he would convert to Christianity and change his name to Francisco Julião, and live out his days as a prisoner.

== Identity of the "Zimba" ==
The identity of Zimba remains unknown. Even their name is uncertain, as the name is attributed to them by the Portuguese (indeed it was a term often ascribed to a variety of bellicose groups during the period). Allegedly they were a cannibal tribe, but it has also been suggested this may have just been an embellishment by Europeans, who tended to ascribe cannibalistic tendencies to African tribes during this time period. It has been suggested they could have been anything from a migrating Maravi warriors to a mercenary army hired by discontented Mombasans or perhaps a local group that preferred Portuguese influence to that of Ottoman interlopers.

The elusive identity of the group has caused some historians to even go so far as to suggest they were a fiction created by Portuguese writers. However Giancarlo Casale argues that this is a mistaken viewpoint, arguing that while the identity of the Zimba is unknown, it is undeniable that some third party did show up in force at the battle. Casale argues that if they were fictional, it is not clear why the Portuguese would make them up; the Ottomans' conflicts with Christendom made them an opponent par excellence for any Portuguese noble at the time and Portugal wanted to prove her actions in the Indian Ocean against the Ottoman Empire were equal to those of any European state in the Mediterranean. Portuguese chroniclers were more likely to exaggerate their countrymen's role, rather than downplay it. Thus Casale argues that it makes no sense for the Portuguese to invent a fictional force that suddenly intervenes in the conflict at a critical moment and deprives the Portuguese forces of credit for their victory. Thus in Casale's view, while the identity and even name of the Zimba may be uncertain, it is highly likely that some third party did intervene during the battle.

== Legacy ==
Mir Ali Beg was a prominent figure in the Ottoman history of expansion in the Indian Ocean. His early voyages marked some of the first contentions to Portuguese control of the area by the Ottoman Empire, and his defeat at Mombasa in 1589 would mark the end of the Ottomans attempts to contest to the Portuguese the Indian Ocean for the rest of their history.
