= List of airports in Dadra and Nagar Haveli and Daman and Diu =

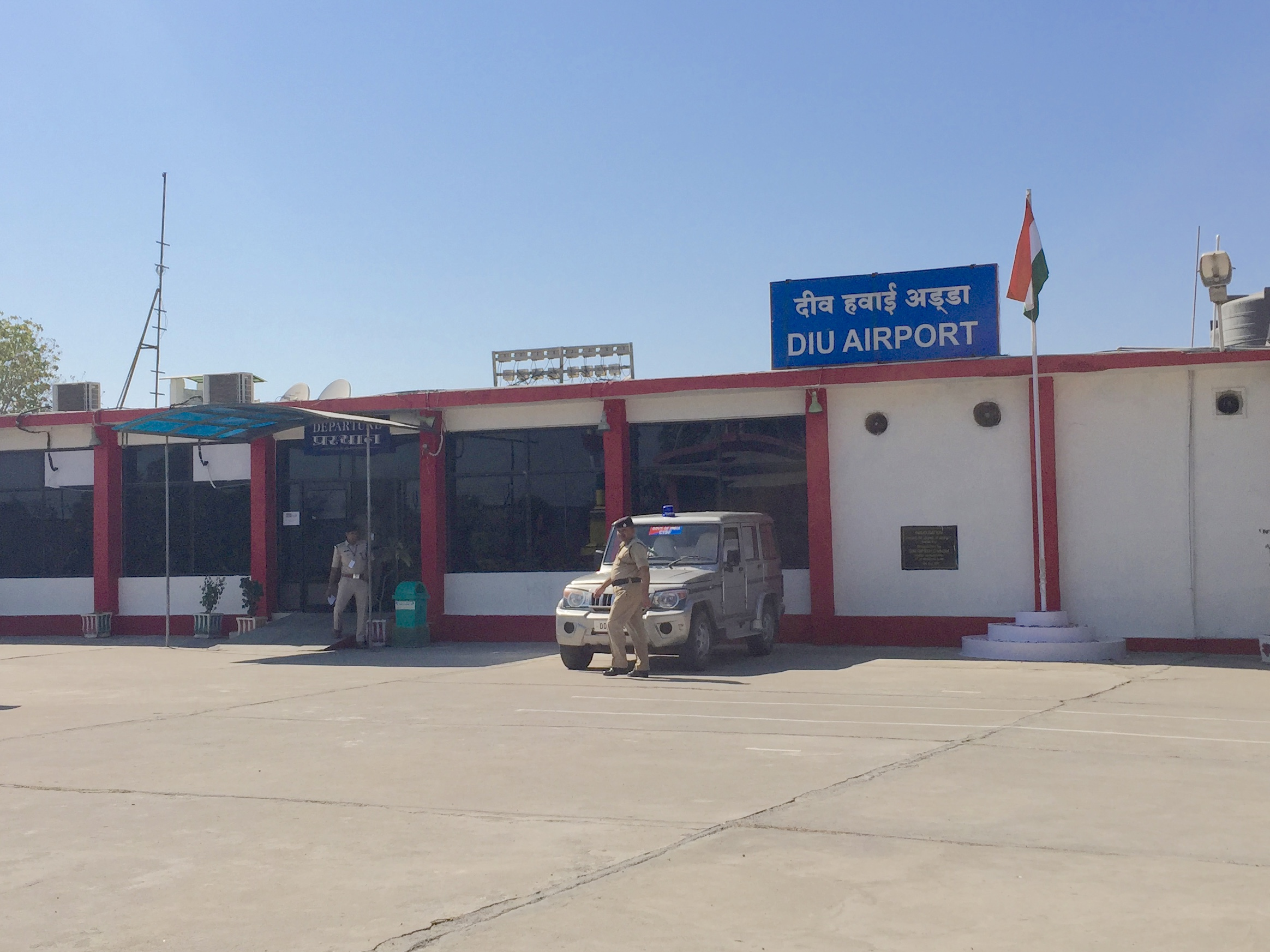
Diu Airport

The union territory of Dadra and Nagar Haveli and Daman and Diu has currently only one-functional airport at Diu. There's another airport at Daman but it is not-operational. Daman Airport is proposed to be operationalised soon under the centre's UDAN scheme. Dadra and Nagar Haveli district does not have an airport of its own yet.

== List ==
The list includes the airports in Dadra and Nagar Haveli and Daman and Diu with their respective ICAO and IATA codes.

List of airports in Dadra and Nagar Haveli and Daman and Diu
Sl. no.	Location in Dadra and Nagar Haveli and Daman and Diu	Airport name	ICAO	IATA	Operator	Category	Role
1	Daman	Daman Airport	VADN	NMB	Indian Coast Guard	Military airbase	Defence
2	Diu	Diu Airport	VA1P	DIU	Airports Authority of India	Domestic airport	Commercial/Defence
