= Manuel António Vassalo e Silva =

Governor-General of Portuguese India (1958–1961)

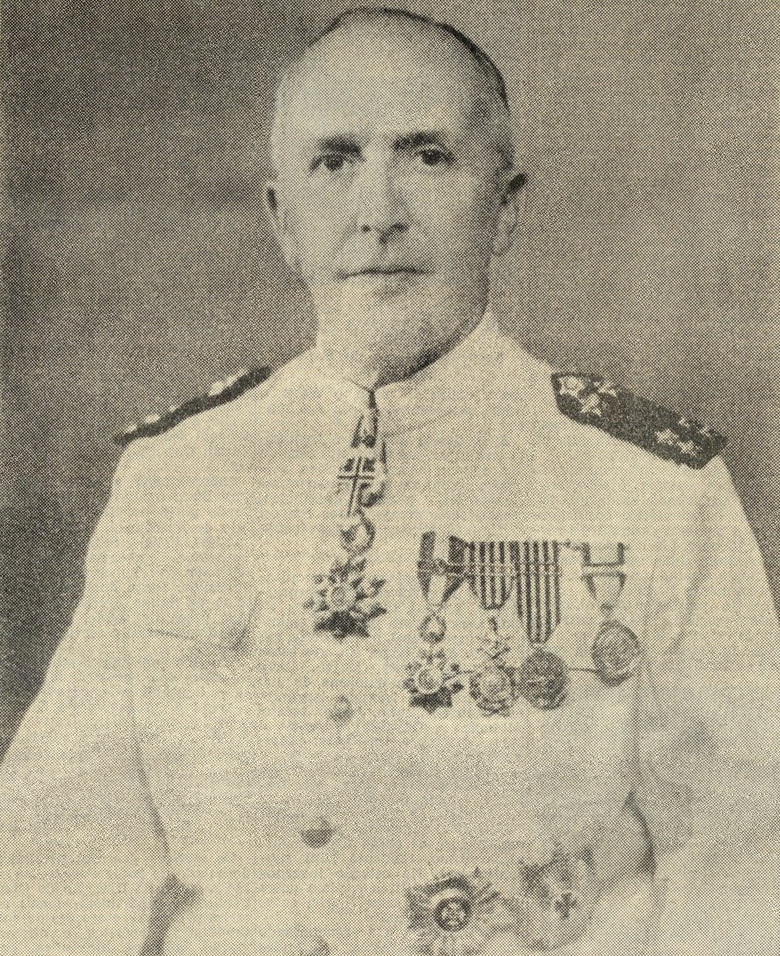
- Official portrait, 1960

Governor-General of Portuguese India
- In office 1958 – 19 December 1961
- President: Américo Tomás
- Prime Minister: António de Oliveira Salazar
- Preceded by: Paulo Bénard Guedes
- Succeeded by: Office abolished (K. P. Candeth as Military Governor of Goa, Daman and Diu) (Dayanand Bandodkar as Chief Minister of Goa, Daman and Diu)

Personal details
- Born: 8 November 1899 Torres Novas, Kingdom of Portugal
- Died: 11 August 1985 (aged 85) Lisbon, Portugal
- Spouse: Fernanda Pereira e Silva Monteiro
- Children: 3
- Relatives: Maria Lamas (sister)
- Profession: Army officer

Manuel António Vassalo e Silva (8 November 1899 – 11 August 1985) was an officer of the Portuguese Army and an overseas administrator. He was the 128th and the last Governor-General of Portuguese India.

== Personal life ==
Silva was the only son of Manuel Caetano da Silva (1870–1926) and his wife Maria da Encarnação Vassalo (1869–1922), and was the brother of the feminist author and anti-government campaigner Maria Lamas. He was married, with two daughters, Joana and Aurora.

== Governor-General of Portuguese India ==
In 1958, Silva was nominated to replace Paulo Bénard Guedes as the 128th Governor-General of Portuguese India. At the same time, he was also appointed Commander-in-Chief of the Portuguese Armed Forces in India.

When the Republic of India sought to annex the territories of Goa, Daman (from which had been previously separated in 1954 and annexed by India in 1961 the enclave of Dadra and Nagar Haveli) and Diu from Portuguese control in December 1961, Silva, recognizing the futility of facing a superior enemy, disobeyed direct orders from the President of the Council of Ministers (Prime Minister) of Portugal, António de Oliveira Salazar to fight to the death and surrendered the following day to the 48th Indian Infantry Brigade under Gurbux Singh, following several losses and the destruction of the warship NRP Afonso de Albuquerque. After that he fell into disgrace at the eyes of Salazar, who never accepted the fait accompli of the annexation.

Silva was greeted with a hostile reception when he returned to Portugal. He was subsequently court martialed for failing to follow orders, expelled from the military and was sent into exile. His rank and freedom were restored only in 1974, after the fall of the authoritarian regime, and he was given back his military status. He was later able to conduct a state visit to Goa, where he was given a warm reception.

Portuguese politician Narana Coissoró claimed that Salazar had sent Silva a cyanide capsule for use in case of defeat.

== Family ==
He was married to Fernanda Pereira e Silva Monteiro and had a son and two daughters:

- Fernando Manuel Pereira Monteiro Vassalo e Silva (Lisbon, 6 December 1925 – Lisbon, 9 June 2006), married to Maria Amélia Franco Veiga (Lisbon, 20 March 1932 – 17 March 2004), daughter of António Veiga and wife Rosa Maria Garcia Franco, and had issue, seven children, two married and had issue.
- Maria Fernanda Pereira Monteiro Vassalo e Silva, married to Rui António da Cunha Bernardino, and had issue, eight children, eight married and had issue, has now grandchildren and great-grandchildren, the first having the name India.
- Maria da Luz Pereira Monteiro Vassalo e Silva, married to António Faias Sors Lagrifa, born in Luanda, and had issue (their son Jorge Manuel Vassalo Sors Lagrifa (7 May 1948 – 6 February 2005) was the second husband without issue of Ana Cristina da Gama Caeiro da Mota Veiga, born in Lisbon, Santos o Velho, on 4 June 1950, daughter of António da Mota Veiga and wife Maria Emília da Gama Caeiro, formerly married and divorced from Marcelo Rebelo de Sousa).
