= Indian annexation of Goa =

1961 annexation by India

- Part of the decolonisation of Asia and the Cold War
- Location of the Union Territory of Daman and Diu and state of Goa in present-day India
Date	17–19 December 1961 (2 days)
Location	Goa, Daman and Diu, Portuguese India; (incl. surrounding sea and airspace)
Result	Indian victory
Territorial changes	Incorporation of the Portuguese colonial territories of Goa, Daman and Diu into the Republic of India

Belligerents
India	Portugal: Portuguese India

Commanders and leaders
Rajendra Prasad; Jawaharlal Nehru; V. K. Krishna Menon; Jayanto Nath Chaudhuri; AVM Erlic Pinto; Maj. Gen. K. P. Candeth	António Salazar; M. A. Vassalo e Silva

Strength
45,000 infantry M4 Sherman tanks and armoured cars 1 light aircraft carrier 2 light cruisers 1 destroyer 8 frigates 4 minesweepers 20 Canberra medium bombers 6 Vampire fighters 6 Toofani fighter-bombers 6 Hunter multi-role aircraft 4 Mystère fighter-bombers T-6 Texan aircraft	3,500 military personnel 1 sloop 3 inshore patrol boats

Casualties and losses
22 killed 225 wounded	30 killed; 57 wounded; 1 sloop lost; 1 patrol boat sunk; 4,668 captured

The Republic of India annexed the Portuguese State of India, the then Portuguese Indian territories of Goa, Daman and Diu, starting with the armed action carried out by the Indian Armed Forces in December 1961. In India, this action is referred to as the "Liberation of Goa". In Portugal, it is referred to as the "Invasion of Goa". Jawaharlal Nehru had hoped that the popular movement in Goa and the pressure of world public opinion would force the Portuguese Goan authorities to grant it independence, but without success; consequently, Krishna Menon suggested taking Goa by force.

The operation was codenamed Operation Vijay (meaning "Victory" in Sanskrit) by the Indian Armed Forces. It involved air, sea and land strikes for over 36 hours, and was a decisive victory for India, ending 451 years of rule by Portugal over its remaining exclaves in India. The engagement lasted two days, and twenty-two Indians and thirty Portuguese were killed in the fighting. The brief conflict drew a mixture of worldwide praise and condemnation. In India, the action was seen as a liberation of historically Indian territory, while Portugal viewed it as an aggression against its national soil and citizens. Justifying the successful military action, Nehru remarked that the "Portuguese ultimately left no choice open to us."

Following the end of Portuguese rule in 1961, Goa was placed under military administration headed by Major General Kunhiraman Palat Candeth as lieutenant governor. On 8 June 1962, military rule was replaced by civilian government when the lieutenant governor nominated an informal Consultative Council of 29 nominated members to assist him in the administration of the territory.

== Background ==
After India's independence from the British Empire in August 1947, Portugal continued to hold a handful of exclaves on the Indian subcontinent—the districts of Goa, Daman and Diu and Dadra and Nagar Haveli—collectively known as the State of India. Goa, Daman and Diu covered an area of around 1,540 square miles (4,000 km^{2}) and held a population of 637,591. The Goan diaspora was estimated at 175,000 (about 100,000 within the Indian Union, mainly in Bombay). Religious distribution was 61% Hindu, 37% Christian (mostly Catholic) and 2% Muslim. The economy was primarily based on agriculture, although the 1940s and 1950s saw a boom in mining—principally iron ore and some manganese.

=== Portuguese government ===
During this period, Portugal was governed by the Estado Novo regime. This government was a dictatorship and a strong proponent of colonialism. The Estado Novo viewed Portugal's overseas territories as extensions of Portugal itself. Under the Estado Novo, Portugal tried to perpetuate a vast, centuries-old empire with a total area of 2,168,071 square kilometres (837,097 mi^{2}), while other former colonial powers had, by this time, largely acceded to global calls for self-determination and independence of their overseas colonies.

=== Local resistance to Portuguese rule ===
Resistance to Portuguese rule in Goa in the 20th century was pioneered by Tristão de Bragança Cunha, a French-educated Goan engineer who founded the Goa Congress Committee in Portuguese India in 1928. Cunha released a booklet called 'Four hundred years of Foreign Rule', and a pamphlet, 'Denationalisation of Goa', intended to sensitise Goans to the oppression of Portuguese rule. Messages of solidarity were received by the Goa Congress Committee from leading figures in the Indian independence movement including Rajendra Prasad, Jawaharlal Nehru and Subhas Chandra Bose. On 12 October 1938, Cunha with other members of the Goa Congress Committee met Subhas Chandra Bose, the President of the Indian National Congress, and on his advice, opened a Branch Office of the Goa Congress Committee at 21, Dalal Street, Bombay. The Goa Congress was also made affiliate to the Indian National Congress and Cunha was selected as its first President.

In June 1946, Ram Manohar Lohia, an Indian Socialist leader, entered Goa on a visit to his friend, Juliao Menezes, a nationalist leader, who had founded the Gomantak Praja Mandal in Bombay and edited the weekly newspaper Gomantak. Cunha and other leaders were also with him. Ram Manohar Lohia advocated the use of non-violent Gandhian techniques to oppose the government. On 18 June 1946, now celebrated as Goa Revolution Day, the Portuguese government disrupted a protest against the suspension of civil liberties in Panaji (then spelt 'Panjim') organised by Lohia, Cunha and others including Purushottam Kakodkar and Laxmikant Bhembre in defiance of a ban on public gatherings, and arrested them. There were intermittent mass demonstrations from June to November.

In addition to non-violent protests, armed groups such as the Azad Gomantak Dal (Free Goa Party) and the United Front of Goans (UFG) conducted violent attacks aimed at weakening Portuguese rule in Goa. The Indian government supported the establishment of armed groups like the Azad Gomantak Dal, giving them full financial, logistic and armament support. The armed groups acted from bases situated in Indian territory and under cover of Indian police forces. The Indian government—through these armed groups—attempted to destroy economic targets, telegraph and telephone lines, road, water and rail transport, in order to impede economic activity and create conditions for a general uprising of the population. A Portuguese army officer stationed with the army in Goa, Captain Carlos Azaredo, stated in 2001 in the Portuguese newspaper Expresso: "To the contrary to what is being said, the most evolved guerrilla warfare which our Armed Forces encountered was in Goa. I know what I'm talking about, because I also fought in Angola and in Guinea (Portuguese Guinea). In 1961 alone, until December, around 80 policemen died. The major part of the freedom fighters of Azad Gomantak Dal (AGD) were not Goans. Many had fought in the British Army, under General Montgomery, against the Germans."

=== Diplomatic efforts to resolve Goa dispute ===
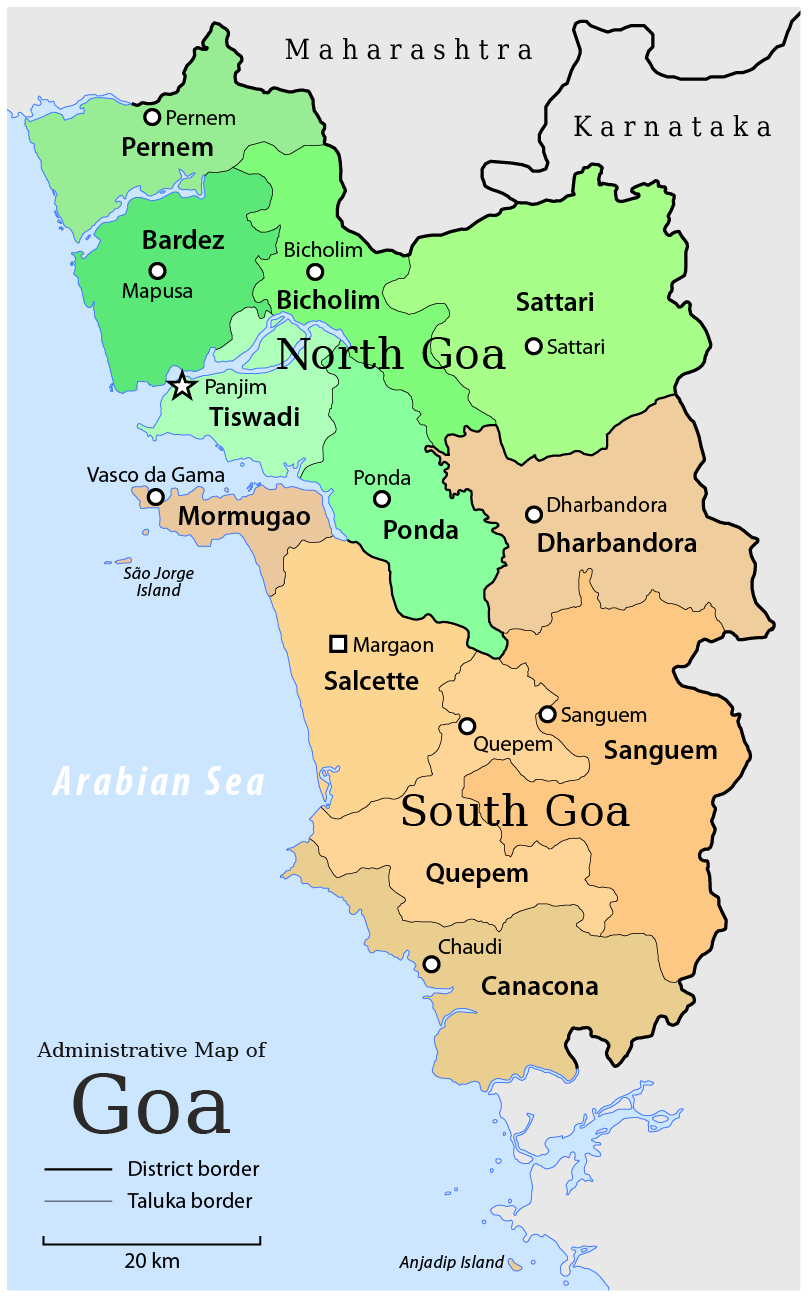
Goa, Western India

On 27 February 1950, the government of India asked the Portuguese government to open negotiations about the future of Portuguese colonies in India. Portugal asserted that its territory on the Indian subcontinent was not a colony but part of metropolitan Portugal and hence its transfer was non-negotiable, and that India had no rights to this territory because the Republic of India did not exist at the time when Goa came under Portuguese rule. When the Portuguese government refused to respond to subsequent aide-mémoires in this regard, the Indian government, on 11 June 1953, withdrew its diplomatic mission from Lisbon.

By 1954, the Republic of India instituted visa restrictions on travel from Goa to India which paralysed transport between Goa and other exclaves like Daman, Diu, Dadra and Nagar Haveli. In the same year, India instituted sanctions on Portugal with the aim of the annexation of Goa into India; the sanction would remain until 1961. Meanwhile, the Indian Union of Dockers had, in 1954, instituted a boycott on shipping to Portuguese India. Between 22 July and 2 August 1954, armed activists attacked and forced the surrender of Portuguese forces stationed in Dadra and Nagar Haveli.

On 15 August 1955, 3,000–5,000 unarmed Indian activists attempted to enter Goa at six locations and were violently repulsed by Portuguese police officers, resulting in the deaths of between 21 and 30 people. The news of the incident built public opinion in India against the presence of the Portuguese in Goa. On 1 September 1955, India shut its consul office in Goa.

In 1956, the Portuguese ambassador to France, Marcello Mathias, along with Portuguese Prime Minister António de Oliveira Salazar, argued in favour of a referendum in Goa to determine its future. This proposal was however rejected by the Ministers for Defence and Foreign Affairs. The demand for a referendum was repeated by presidential candidate General Humberto Delgado in 1957.

Prime Minister Salazar, alarmed by India's hinted threats at armed action against Portugal's presence in Goa, first asked the United Kingdom to mediate, then protested through Brazil and eventually asked the United Nations Security Council to intervene. Mexico offered the Indian government its influence in Latin America to bring pressure on the Portuguese to relieve tensions. Meanwhile, Krishna Menon, India's defence minister and head of India's UN delegation, stated in no uncertain terms that India had not "abjured the use of force" in Goa. The US ambassador to India, John Kenneth Galbraith, requested the Indian government on several occasions to resolve the issue peacefully through mediation and consensus rather than armed conflict.

On 24 November 1961, Sabarmati, a passenger boat passing between the Indian port of Kochi and the Portuguese-held island of Anjidiv, was fired upon by Portuguese ground troops, resulting in the death of a passenger and injuries to the chief engineer. The action was precipitated by Portuguese fears that the boat carried a military landing party intent on storming the island. The incidents lent themselves to fostering widespread public support in India for military action in Goa.

Eventually, on 10 December, nine days prior to the armed action, code named Operation Vijay, Nehru stated to the press: "Continuance of Goa under Portuguese rule is an impossibility". The American response was to warn India that if and when India's armed action in Goa was brought to the UN Security Council, it could expect no support from the US delegation.

=== Annexation of Dadra and Nagar Haveli ===
The hostilities between India and Portugal started seven years before the annexation of Goa, when Dadra and Nagar Haveli were invaded and occupied by pro-Indian forces with the support of the Indian authorities.

Dadra and Nagar Haveli were two Portuguese landlocked exclaves of the Daman district, totally surrounded by Indian territory. The connection between the exclaves and the coastal territory of Daman had to be made by crossing about 20 kilometres (12 mi) of Indian territory. Dadra and Nagar Haveli did not have any Portuguese military garrison, but only police forces.

The Indian government started to develop isolation actions against Dadra and Nagar Haveli already in 1952, including the creation of impediments to the transit of persons and goods between the two landlocked enclaves and Daman; the use of these economic warfare tactics by India caused a deep economic depression in Goa with subsequent hardship for the inhabitants and, in attempt to remedy the situation and with land travel precluded, Salazar established a new airline to communicate the enclaves of Portuguese India with its ports. In July 1954, pro-Indian forces, including members of organisations like the United Front of Goans, the National Movement Liberation Organisation, the Communist Party of India, the Rashtriya Swayamsevak Sangh and the Azad Gomantak Dal, with the support of Indian Police forces, began to launch assaults against Dadra and Nagar Haveli. On the night of 22 July, UFG forces stormed the small Dadra police station, killing Police Sergeant Aniceto do Rosário and Constable António Fernandes, who resisted the attack. On 28 July, RSS forces took Naroli police station.

Meanwhile, the Portuguese authorities asked the Indian Government for permission to cross the Indian territory with reinforcements to Dadra and Nagar Haveli, but no permission was given. Surrounded and prevented from receiving reinforcements by the Indian authorities, the Portuguese Administrator and police forces in Nagar Haveli eventually surrendered to the Indian police forces on 11 August 1954. Portugal appealed to the International Court of Justice, which, in a decision dated 12 April 1960, stated that Portugal had sovereign rights over the territories of Dadra and Nagar Haveli but India had the right to deny passage to armed personnel of Portugal over Indian territories. Therefore, the Portuguese authorities could not legally pass through Indian territory.

== Events preceding the hostilities ==
=== Indian military build-up ===
On receiving Krishna Menon's order to initiate military action and capture of all occupied territories for the Indian government, Lieutenant-General Chaudhari of the Indian Army's Southern Command fielded the 17th Infantry Division commanded by Major General K. P. Candeth and the 50th Parachute Brigade commanded by Brigadier Sagat Singh. The assault on the enclave of Daman was assigned to the 1st battalion of the Maratha Light Infantry while the operations in Diu were assigned to the 20th battalion of the Rajput Regiment and the 5th battalion of the Madras Regiment.

Meanwhile, the Commander-in-Chief of India's Western Air Command, Air Vice Marshal Erlic Pinto, was appointed as the commander of all air resources assigned to the operations in Goa. Air resources for the assault on Goa were concentrated in the bases at Pune and Sambra (Belgaum). The mandate handed to Pinto by the Indian Air Command was listed out as follows:

1. The destruction of Goa's lone airfield in Dabolim, without causing damage to the terminal building and other airport facilities.
2. Destruction of the wireless station at Bambolim, Goa.
3. Denial of airfields at Daman and Diu, which were, however, not to be attacked without prior permission.
4. Support to advancing ground troops.

The Indian Navy deployed two warships—the INS Rajput, an 'R' Class destroyer, and INS Kirpan, a Blackwood-class anti-submarine frigate—off the coast of Goa. The actual attack on Goa was delegated to four task groups: a Surface Action Group comprising five ships: Fiji-class light cruiser Mysore, Blackwood-class frigate Trishul, Leopard-class frigates Betwa and Beas, and sloop Kaveri; a Carrier Group of five ships: Leander-class light cruiser Delhi, Blackwood-class frigates Kuthar, Kirpan and Khukri, and R-class destroyer Rajput centred on the light aircraft carrier Vikrant; a Mine Sweeping Group consisting of Ton-class minesweepers Karwar, Kakinada and Cannonore and Ham-class minesweeper Bimlipatan, and a Support Group which consisted of Dharini.

=== Portuguese mandate ===
In March 1960, Portuguese Defence Minister General Júlio Botelho Moniz told Prime Minister Salazar that a sustained Portuguese campaign against decolonisation would create for the army "a suicide mission in which we could not succeed". His opinion was shared by Army Minister Colonel Afonso Magalhães de Almeida Fernandes, by the Army under secretary of State Lieutenant-Colonel Francisco da Costa Gomes and by other top officers.

Ignoring this advice, Salazar sent a message to Governor General Manuel António Vassalo e Silva in Goa on 14 December, in which he ordered the Portuguese forces in Goa to fight to the last man: "Do not expect the possibility of truce or of Portuguese prisoners, as there will be no surrender rendered because I feel that our soldiers and sailors can be either victorious or dead." Salazar asked Vassalo e Silva to hold out for at least eight days, within which time he hoped to gather international support against the Indian invasion. Vassalo e Silva disobeyed Salazar to avoid the unnecessary loss of human lives and surrendered the day after the Indian invasion.

=== Portuguese military preparations ===
Portuguese military preparations began in 1954, following the Indian economic blockade, the beginning of the anti-Portuguese attacks in Goa and the annexation of Dadra and Nagar Haveli. Three light infantry battalions (one each sent from Portugal, Angola and Mozambique) and support units were transported to Goa, reinforcing a locally raised battalion and increasing the Portuguese military presence there from almost nothing to 12,000 men. Other sources state that, at the end of 1955, Portuguese forces in India represented a total of around 8,000 men (Europeans, Africans and Indians), including 7,000 in the land forces, 250 in the naval forces, 600 in the police and 250 in the Fiscal Guard, split between the districts of Goa, Daman and Diu. Following the annexation of Dadra and Nagar Haveli, the Portuguese authorities markedly strengthened the garrison of Portuguese India, with units and personnel sent from the Metropole and from the Portuguese African provinces of Angola and Mozambique.

The Portuguese forces were organised as the Armed Forces of the State of India (FAEI, Forças Armadas do Estado da Índia), under a unified command headed by General Paulo Bénard Guedes, who combined the civil role of Governor-General with the military role of Commander-in-Chief. Guedes ended his commission in 1958, with General Vassalo e Silva being appointed to replace him in both the civil and military roles.

The Portuguese government and military commands were, however, well aware that even with this effort to strengthen the garrison of Goa, the Portuguese forces would never be sufficient to face a conventional attack from the overwhelmingly stronger Indian Armed Forces. The Portuguese government hoped however to politically deter the Indian government from attempting a military aggression through the showing of a strong will to fight and to sacrifice to defend Goa.

In 1960, during an inspection visit to Portuguese India and referring to a predictable start of guerrilla activities in Angola, the Under Secretary of State of the Army, Francisco da Costa Gomes, stated the necessity to reinforce the Portuguese military presence in that African territory, partly at the expense of the military presence in Goa, where the then existing 7,500 men were too many just to deal with anti-Portuguese actions, and too few to face an Indian invasion, which, if it were to occur, would have to be handled by other means. This led to the Portuguese forces in India suffering a sharp reduction to about 3,300 soldiers.

Faced with this reduced force strength, the strategy employed to defend Goa against an Indian invasion was based on the Plano Sentinela (Sentinel Plan), which divided the territory into four defence sectors (North, Centre, South and Mormugão), and the Plano de Barragens (Barrage Plan), which envisaged the demolition of all bridges to delay the invading army, as well as the mining of approach roads and beaches. Defence units were organised as four battlegroups (agrupamentos), with one assigned to each sector and tasked with slowing the progress of an invading force. Then-Captain Carlos Azaredo, who was stationed in Goa at the time of hostilities, described the Plano Sentinela in the Portuguese newspaper Expresso on 8 December 2001 as "a totally unrealistic and unachievable plan, which was quite incomplete. It was based on exchange of ground with time. But, for this purpose, portable communication equipment was necessary." The plans to mine roads and beaches were also unviable because of an insufficient quantity of mines.

==== Navy ====
The naval component of the FAEI were the Naval Forces of the State of India (FNEI, Forças Navais do Estado da Índia), headed by the Naval Commander of Goa, Commodore Raúl Viegas Ventura. The only significant Portuguese Navy warship present in Goa at the time of invasion was the sloop NRP Afonso de Albuquerque. It was armed with four 120 mm guns capable of two shots per minute, and four automatic rapid-firing guns. In addition to the sloop, the Portuguese Naval Forces had three light patrol boats (lanchas de fiscalização), each armed with a 20 mm Oerlikon gun, one based in each of Goa, Daman and Diu. There were also five merchant marine ships in Goa. An attempt by Portugal to send naval warships to Goa to reinforce its marine defences was foiled when President Gamal Abdel Nasser of Egypt denied the ships access to the Suez Canal.

==== Ground forces ====
Portuguese ground defences were organised as the Land Forces of the State of India (FTEI, Forças Terrestres do Estado da Índia), under the Portuguese Army's Independent Territorial Command of India, headed by Brigadier António José Martins Leitão. At the time of the invasion, they consisted of a total of 3,995 men, including 810 native (Indo-Portuguese) soldiers, many of whom had little military training and were utilised primarily for security and anti-extremist operations. These forces were divided amongst the three Portuguese enclaves in India. The Portuguese Army units in Goa included four motorised reconnaissance squadrons, eight rifle companies (caçadores), two artillery batteries and an engineer detachment. In addition to the military forces, the Portuguese defences counted on the civil internal security forces of Portuguese India. These included the State of India Police (PEI, Polícia do Estado da Índia), a general police corps modelled after the Portuguese Public Security Police; the Fiscal Guard (Guarda Fiscal), responsible for Customs enforcement and border protection; and the Rural Guard (Guarda Rural), game wardens. In 1958, as an emergency measure, the Portuguese government gave provisional military status to the PEI and the Fiscal Guard, placing them under the command of the FAEI. The security forces were also divided amongst the three districts and were mostly made up of Indo-Portuguese policemen and guards. Different sources indicate between 900 and 1400 men as the total effective strength of these forces at the time of the invasion.

==== Air defence ====
The Portuguese Air Force did not have any presence in Portuguese India, with the exception of a single officer with the role of air adviser in the office of the Commander-in-Chief.

On 16 December, the Portuguese Air Force was placed on alert to transport ten tonnes of anti-tank grenades in two Douglas DC-6 aircraft from Montijo Air Base in Portugal to Goa to assist in its defence. When the Portuguese Air Force was unable to obtain stopover facilities at any air base along the way because most countries, including Pakistan, denied passage of Portuguese military aircraft, the mission was passed to the Portuguese international civilian airline TAP, which offered a Lockheed Constellation (registration CS-TLA) on charter. However, when permission to transport weapons through Karachi was denied by the Pakistani government, the Constellation landed in Goa at 18:00 on 17 December with a consignment of half a dozen bags of sausages as food supplies instead of the intended grenades. In addition it transported a contingent of female paratroopers to assist in the evacuation of Portuguese civilians.

The Portuguese air presence in Goa at the time of hostilities was thus limited to the presence of two civilian transport aircraft, the Lockheed Constellation belonging to TAP and a Douglas DC-4 Skymaster belonging to the Goan airline Portuguese India Airlines. The Indians claimed that the Portuguese had a squadron of F-86 Sabres stationed at Dabolim Airport—which later turned out to be false intelligence. Air defence was limited to a few obsolete anti-aircraft guns manned by two artillery units who had been smuggled into Goa disguised as football teams.

=== Portuguese civilian evacuation ===
The military buildup created panic amongst Europeans in Goa, who were desperate to evacuate their families before the commencement of hostilities. On 9 December, the vessel India arrived at Goa's Mormugão port en route to Lisbon from Timor. Despite orders from the Portuguese government in Lisbon not to allow anyone to embark on this vessel, Governor General Manuel Vassalo e Silva allowed 700 Portuguese civilians of European origin to board the ship and flee Goa. The ship had capacity for only 380 passengers, and was filled to its limits, with evacuees occupying even the toilets. On arranging this evacuation of women and children, Vassalo e Silva remarked to the press, "If necessary, we will die here." Evacuation of European civilians continued by air even after the commencement of Indian air strikes.

=== Indian reconnaissance operations ===
Indian reconnaissance operations had commenced on 1 December, when two Leopard class frigates, the INS Betwa and the INS Beas, undertook linear patrolling of the Goa coast at a distance of 8 miles (13 km). By 8 December, the Indian Air Force had commenced baiting missions and fly-bys to lure out Portuguese air defences and fighters.

On 17 December, a tactical reconnaissance flight conducted by Squadron Leader I. S. Loughran in a Vampire NF54 Night Fighter over Dabolim Airport in Goa was met with five rounds fired from a ground anti-aircraft gun. The aircraft took evasive action by drastically dropping altitude and escaping out to sea. The anti-aircraft gun was later recovered near the ATC building with a round jammed in its breech.

The Indian light aircraft carrier INS Vikrant was deployed 75 miles (121 km) from the coast of Goa to head off a possible amphibious operation on Goa and deter any foreign military intervention.

== Commencement of hostilities ==
=== Military actions in Goa ===
==== Ground attack on Goa: North and North East sectors ====
On 11 December 1961, 17th Infantry Division and attached troops of the Indian Army were ordered to advance into Goa to capture Panaji and Mormugão. The main thrust on Panaji was to be made by the 50th Para Brigade Group, led by Brigadier Sagat Singh from the north. Another thrust was to be carried out by 63rd Indian Infantry Brigade from the east. A deceptive thrust, in company strength, was to be made from the south along the Majali-Canacona-Margao axis.

Although the 50th Para Brigade was charged with merely assisting the main thrust conducted by the 17th Infantry, its units moved rapidly across minefields, roadblocks and four riverine obstacles to be the first to reach Panaji.

Hostilities at Goa began at 09:45 on 17 December 1961, when a unit of Indian troops attacked and occupied the town of Maulinguém in the north east, killing two Portuguese soldiers. The Portuguese 2nd EREC (esquadrão de reconhecimento—reconnaissance squadron), stationed near Maulinguém, asked for permission to engage the Indians, but permission was refused at about 13:45. During the afternoon of the 17th, the Portuguese command issued instructions that all orders to defending troops would be issued directly by headquarters, bypassing the local command outposts. This led to confusion in the chain of command. At 02:00 on 18 December, the 2nd EREC was sent to the town of Doromagogo to support the withdrawal of police forces present in the area, and were attacked by Indian Army units on their return journey.

At 04:00, the Indian assault commenced with artillery bombardment on Portuguese positions south of Maulinguém, launched on the basis of the false intelligence that the Portuguese had stationed heavy battle tanks in the area. By 04:30, Bicholim was under fire. At 04:40, the Portuguese forces destroyed the bridge at Bicholim and followed this with the destruction of the bridges at Chapora in Colvale and at Assonora at 05:00.

On the morning of 18 December, the 50th Para Brigade of the Indian Army moved into Goa in three columns.

1. The eastern column comprised the 2nd Para Maratha advanced towards the town of Ponda in central Goa via Usgão.
2. The central column consisting of the 1st Para Punjab advanced towards Panaji via the village of Banastari.
3. The western column—the main thrust of the attack—comprised the 2nd Sikh Light Infantry as well as an armoured division which crossed the border at 06:30 and advanced on Tivim.

At 05:30, Portuguese troops left their barracks at Ponda in central Goa and marched towards the town of Usgão, in the direction of the advancing eastern column of the Indian 2nd Para Maratha, which was under the command of Major Dalip Singh Jind and included M4 Sherman tanks of the Indian 7th Cavalry. At 09:00, these Portuguese troops reported that Indian troops had already covered half the distance to the town of Ponda.

By 10:00, Portuguese forces of the 1st EREC, faced with the advancing 2nd Sikh Light Infantry, began a south-bound withdrawal to the town of Mapuca where, by 12:00, they came under the risk of being surrounded by Indian forces. At 12:30, the 1st EREC began a retreat, making their way through the Indian forces, with their armoured cars firing ahead to cover the withdrawal of the personnel carrier vehicles. This unit relocated by ferry further south to the capital city of Panaji. At 13:30, just after the retreat of the 2nd EREC, the Portuguese destroyed the bridge at Banastarim, cutting off all road links to Panaji.

By 17:45, the forces of the 1st EREC and the 9th Caçadores Company of the Portuguese Battlegroup North had completed their ferry crossing of the Mandovi River to Panaji, just minutes ahead of the arrival of the Indian armoured forces. The Indian tanks had reached Betim, just across the Mandovi River from Panaji, without encountering any opposition. The 2nd Sikh Light Infantry joined it by 21:00, crossing over mines and demolished bridges en route. In the absence of orders, the unit stayed at Betim for the night.

At 20:00, a Goan by the name of Gregório Magno Antão crossed the Mandovi River from Panaji and delivered a ceasefire offer letter from Major Acácio Tenreiro of the Portuguese Army to Major Shivdev Singh Sidhu, the commanding officer of the Indian 7th Cavalry camped there. The letter read: "The Military Commander of the City of Goa states that he wishes to parley with the commander of the army of the Indian Union with respect to the surrender. Under these conditions, the Portuguese troops must immediately cease fire and the Indian troops do likewise in order to prevent the slaughter of the population and the destruction of the city."

The same night Major Shivdev Singh Sidhu with a force of the 7th Cavalry decided to take Fort Aguada and obtain its surrender, after receiving information that a number of supporters of the Indian Republic were held prisoners there. However, the Portuguese defenders of the fort had not yet received orders to surrender and responded by opening fire on the Indian forces, Major Sidhu and Captain Vinod Sehgal being killed in the firefight.

The order for Indian forces to cross the Mandovi River was received on the morning of 19 December, upon which two rifle companies of the 2nd Sikh Light Infantry advanced on Panaji at 07:30 and secured the town without facing any resistance. On orders from Brigadier Sagat Singh, the troops entering Panaji removed their steel helmets and donned the Parachute Regiment's maroon berets. Fort Aguada was also captured on that day, when the Indian 7th Cavalry attacked with assistance from the armoured division stationed at Betim and freed its political prisoners.

==== Advance from the east ====
Meanwhile, in the east, the 63rd Indian Infantry Brigade advanced in two columns. The right column, consisting of the 2nd Bihar Battalion, and the left column, consisting of the 3rd Sikh Battalion, linked up at the border town of Mollem and then advanced by separate routes on Ponda. By nightfall, the 2nd Bihar had reached the town of Candeapur, while the 3rd Sikh had reached Darbondara. Although neither column had encountered any resistance, their further progress was hampered because all bridges spanning the river had been destroyed.

The rear battalion was the 4th Sikh Infantry, which reached Candeapar in the early hours of 19 December, and not to be bogged down by the destruction of the Borim Bridge, went across the Zuari River in their military tankers and then waded through chest-high water across a small stream to reach a dock known as Embarcadouro de Tembim in the village of Raia, from where a road connects to Margão, the administrative centre of southern Goa. Their rear battalion took some rest in a cattle shed and on the grounds and the balcony of an adjacent house before proceeding to Margão by 12:00. From here, the column advanced towards the harbour of Mormugão. En route they encountered fierce resistance from a 500-strong Portuguese unit at the village of Verna, where they were joined by the 2nd Bihar. The Portuguese unit surrendered at 15:30 after fierce fighting, and the 4th Sikh then proceeded to Mormugão and Dabolim Airport, where the main body of the Portuguese Army awaited the Indians.

The 4th Rajput company staged a decoy attack south of Margão in order to mislead the Portuguese. This column overcame minefields, roadblocks and demolished bridges, and eventually went on to help secure the town of Margão.

==== Air raids over Goa ====
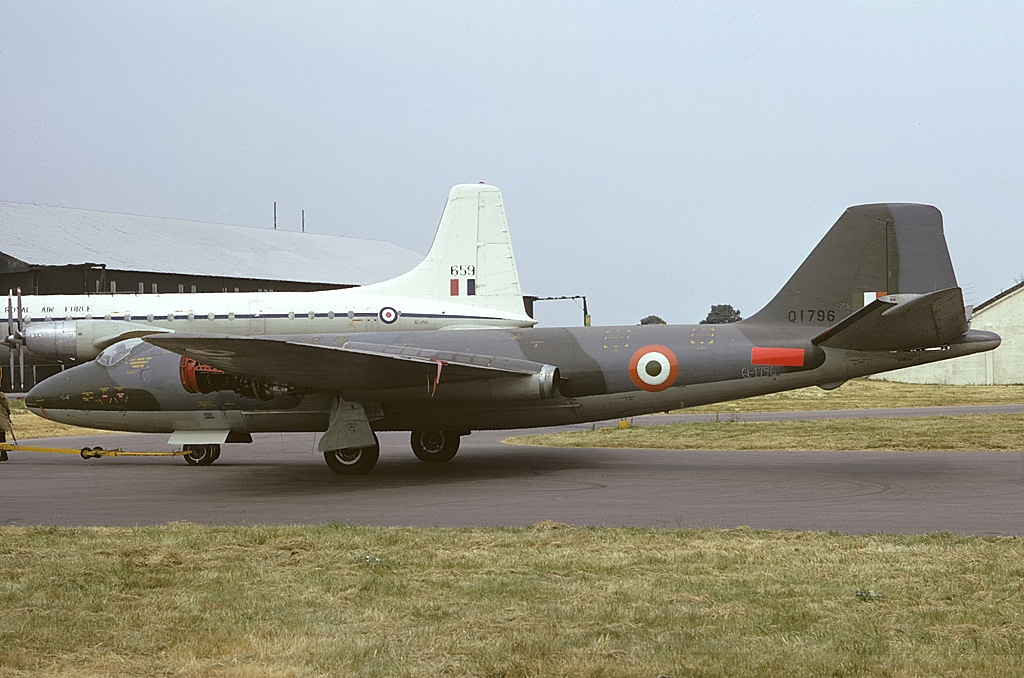
A Canberra bomber of the Indian Air Force. The Indian Air Force used 20 small and lightweight Canberra bombers.

The first Indian raid was led by Wing Commander N.B. Menon on 18 December on the Dabolim Airport using 12 English Electric Canberra aircraft. 63,000 pounds of explosives were dropped within minutes, completely destroying the runway. In line with the mandate given by the Air Command, structures and facilities at the airfield were left undamaged.

The second Indian raid was conducted on the same target by eight Canberras led by Wing Commander Surinder Singh, again leaving the airport's terminal and other buildings untouched. Two civilian transport aircraft—a Lockheed Constellation belonging to the Portuguese airline TAP and a Douglas DC-4 belonging to the Goan airline TAIP—were parked on the apron. On the night of 18 December, the Portuguese used both aircraft to evacuate the families of some government and military officials after airport workers had hastily recovered part of the heavily damaged runway that evening. The first aircraft to leave was the TAP Constellation, commanded by Manuel Correia Reis, which took off using only 700 metres; debris from the runway damaged the fuselage, causing 25 holes and a flat tire. To make the 'short take-off' possible, the pilots had jettisoned all the extra seats and other unwanted equipment. The TAIP DC-4 then also took off, piloted by TAIP Director Major Solano de Almeida. The two aircraft successfully used the cover of night and very low altitudes to break through Indian aerial patrols and escape to Karachi, Pakistan.

A third Indian raid was carried out by six Hawker Hunters, successfully targeting the wireless station at Bambolim with rockets and autocannons.

The mandate to support ground troops was served by the de Havilland Vampires of No. 45 squadron, which patrolled the sector but did not receive any requests into action. In an incident of friendly fire, two Vampires fired rockets into the positions of the 2nd Sikh Light Infantry, injuring two soldiers, while elsewhere, Indian ground troops mistakenly opened fire on an IAF T-6 Texan, causing minimal damage.

In later years, commentators have maintained that India's intense air strikes against the airfields were uncalled-for, since none of the targeted airports had any military capabilities and they did not cater to any military aircraft. As such, the airfields were defenceless civilian targets. The Indian navy continues to control the Dabolim Airport, although it is also once more used as a civilian airport.

==== Storming of Anjidiv Island ====
Anjidiv was a small 1.5 km^{2} island of Portuguese India, then almost uninhabited, belonging to the District of Goa, although off the coast of the Indian state of Karnataka. On the island stood the 16th Century Anjidiv Fort, defended by a platoon of Goan soldiers of the Portuguese Army.

The Indian Naval Command assigned the task of securing Anjidiv to the cruiser INS Mysore and the frigate INS Trishul. Under covering artillery fire from the ships, Indian marines under the command of Lieutenant Arun Auditto stormed the island at 14:25 on 18 December and engaged the Portuguese garrison. The assault was repulsed by the Portuguese defenders, with seven Indian marines killed and 19 wounded. Among the Indian casualties were two officers.

The Portuguese defences were eventually overrun after fierce shelling from the Indian ships offshore. The island was secured by the Indians at 14:00 on the next day, all the Portuguese defenders being captured with the exception of two corporals and one private. Hidden in the rocks, one corporal surrendered on 19 December. The other was captured in the afternoon of 20 December, but not before launching hand grenades that injured several Indian marines. The last of the three, Goan private Manuel Caetano, became the last Portuguese soldier in India to be captured, on 22 December, after he had reached the Indian shore by swimming.

==== Naval battle at Mormugão harbour ====
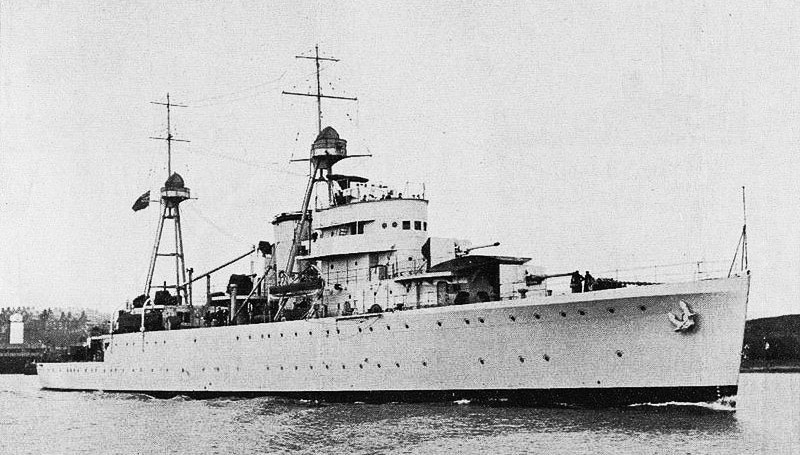
The NRP Afonso de Albuquerque

On the morning of 18 December, the Portuguese sloop NRP Afonso de Albuquerque was anchored off Mormugao Harbour. Besides engaging Indian naval units, the ship was also tasked with providing a coastal artillery battery to defend the harbour and adjoining beaches, and providing vital radio communications with Lisbon after on-shore radio facilities had been destroyed in Indian airstrikes.

At 09:00, three Indian frigates led by the INS Betwa (F139), commanded by Commander R.K.S. Ghandhi, took up position off the harbour, awaiting orders to attack the Afonso and secure sea access to the port. At 11:00, Indian planes bombed Mormugão harbour. At 12:00, upon receiving clearance, the INS Betwa and the INS Beas (F137) entered the harbour and fired on the Afonso with their 4.5-inch guns while transmitting requests to surrender in morse code between shots. In response, the Afonso lifted anchor, headed out towards the enemy and returned fire with its 120mm guns.

The Afonso was outnumbered by the Indians, and was at a severe disadvantage since it was in a confined position that restricted its manoeuvring, and because its four 120mm guns could fire only two rounds a minute, as compared to the 16 rounds per minute of the guns aboard the Indian frigates. A few minutes into the exchange of fire, at 12:15, the Afonso took a direct hit in its control tower, injuring its weapons officer. At 12:25, an anti-personnel shrapnel bomb fired from an Indian vessel exploded directly over the ship, killing its radio officer and severely injuring its commander, Captain António da Cunha Aragão, after which First Officer Pinto da Cruz took command of the vessel. The ship's propulsion system was also badly damaged in this attack.

At 12:35, the Afonso swerved 180 degrees and was run aground against Bambolim beach. At that time, against the commander's orders, a white flag was hoisted under instructions from the sergeant in charge of signals, but the flag coiled itself around the mast and as a result was not spotted by the Indians, who continued their barrage. The flag was immediately lowered.

Eventually at 12:50, after the Afonso had fired nearly 400 rounds at the Indian soldiers, hitting two of the Indian vessels, and had taken severe damage, the order was given to start abandoning ship. Under heavy fire directed at both the ship and the coast, non-essential crew including weapons staff left the ship and went ashore. They were followed at 13:10 by the rest of the crew, who, along with their injured commander, set fire to the ship and disembarked directly onto the beach. Following this, the commander was transferred by car to the hospital at Panaji. On the Indian Union side, two frigates were hit, killing five sailors and injuring thirteen.

The sloop's crew formally surrendered with the remaining Portuguese forces on 19 December 1961 at 20:30. As a gesture of goodwill, the commanders of the INS Betwa and the INS Beas later visited Captain Aragão as he lay recuperating in bed in Panaji.

The Afonso—having been renamed Saravastri by the Indian Navy—lay grounded at the beach near Dona Paula until 1962, when it was towed to Bombay and sold for scrap. Parts of the ship were recovered and are on display at the Naval Museum in Mumbai.

The Portuguese patrol boat NRP Sirius, under the command of Lieutenant Marques Silva, was also present at Goa. After observing Afonso running aground and not having communications from the Goa Naval Command, Lieutenant Marques Silva decided to scuttle the Sirius. This was done by damaging the propellers and making the boat hit the rocks. The eight men of the Sirius's crew avoided being captured by the Indian forces and boarded a Greek freighter on which they reached Pakistan.

=== Military actions in Daman ===
==== Ground attack on Daman ====
Daman, approximately 72 km^{2} (28 sq mi) in area, is at the south end of Gujarat bordering Maharashtra, approximately 193 km north of Bombay. The countryside is broken and interspersed with marsh, salt pans, streams, paddy fields, coconut and palm groves. The river Daman Ganga splits the capital city of Daman (Damão in Portuguese) into halves—Nani Daman (Damão Pequeno) and Moti Daman (Damão Grande). The strategically important features were Daman Fort (fortress of São Jerónimo) and the air control tower of Daman Airport.

The Portuguese garrison in Daman was headed by Major António José da Costa Pinto (combining the roles of District Governor and military commander), with 360 soldiers of the Portuguese Army, 200 policemen and about 30 customs officials under him. The army forces consisted of two companies of caçadores (light infantry) and an artillery battery, organised as the battlegroup "Constantino de Bragança". The artillery battery was armed with 87.6 mm guns, but these had insufficient and old ammunition. The Portuguese also placed a 20 mm anti-aircraft gun ten days before the invasion to protect the artillery. Daman had been secured with small minefields and defensive shelters had been built.

The advance on the enclave of Daman was conducted by the 1st Maratha Light Infantry Battalion under the command of Lieutenant-Colonel S.J.S. Bhonsle in a pre-dawn operation on 18 December. The plan was to capture Daman piecemeal in four phases, starting with the area of the airfield, then progressively the open countryside, Damão Pequeno and finally Damão Grande including the fort.

The advance commenced at 04:00 when one battalion and three companies of Indian soldiers progressed through the central area of the northern territory, aiming to seize the airfield. However, the surprise was lost when the Indian A Company tried to capture the control tower and suffered three casualties. The Portuguese lost one soldier dead and six taken captive. The Indian D Company captured a position named "Point 365" just before the next morning. At the crack of dawn, two sorties by Indian Air Force Mystère fighters struck Portuguese mortar positions and guns inside Moti Daman Fort.

At 04:30, the Indian artillery began to bombard Damão Grande. The artillery attack and transportation difficulties isolated the Portuguese command post there from the forces in Damão Pequeno. At 07:30, a Portuguese unit at the fortress of São Jerónimo fired mortars on Indian forces attempting to capture the airstrip.

At 11:30, Portuguese forces resisting an Indian advance on the eastern border at Varacunda ran out of ammunition and withdrew westwards to Catra. At 12:00, to delay the Indian advance following the withdrawal from Varacunda, the Portuguese artillery battery on the banks of the Daman Ganga River was ordered to open fire. The commander of the battery, Captain Felgueiras de Sousa, instead dismantled the guns and surrendered to the Indians. By 12:00, the airfield was assaulted by the Indian A and C companies simultaneously. In the ensuing exchange of fire the A Company lost one more soldier and seven were wounded.

By 13:00, the remaining Portuguese forces on the east border at Calicachigão exhausted their ammunition and retreated towards the coast. By 17:00, in the absence of resistance, the Indians had managed to occupy most of the territory, except the airfield and Damão Pequeno, where the Portuguese were making their last stand. By this time, the Indian Air Force had conducted six air attacks, severely demoralising the Portuguese forces. At 20:00, after a meeting between the Portuguese commanders, a delegation was dispatched to the Indian lines to open negotiations, but was fired on, and was forced to withdraw. A similar attempt by the artillery to surrender at 08:00 next day was also fired on.

The Indians assaulted the airfield the next morning, upon which the Portuguese surrendered at 11:00 without a fight. Garrison commander Major Costa Pinto, although wounded, was stretchered to the airfield, as the Indians were only willing to accept a surrender from him. Approximately 600 Portuguese soldiers and policemen (including 24 officers) were taken prisoner. The Indians suffered 4 dead and 14 wounded, while the Portuguese suffered 10 dead and two wounded. The 1st Light Maratha Infantry was decorated for the battle with one Vishisht Seva Medal (VSM) for the commanding officer, two Sena Medals and five mentioned in dispatches.

==== Daman air raids ====
In the Daman sector, Indian Mystères flew 14 sorties, continuously harassing Portuguese artillery positions.

==== Naval action at Daman ====
Like the Vega in Diu, the patrol boat NRP Antares—based at Daman under the command of 2nd Lieutenant Abreu Brito—was ordered to sail out and fight the imminent Indian invasion. The boat stayed in position from 07:00 on 18 December and remained a mute witness to repeated air strikes followed by ground invasion until 19:20, when it lost all communications with land.

With all information pointing to total occupation of all Portuguese enclaves in India, Lieutenant Brito decided to save his crew and vessel by escaping; the Vega traversed 530 miles (850 km), escaping detection by Indian forces, and arrived at Karachi at 20:00 on 20 December.

=== Military actions in Diu ===
==== Ground attack on Diu ====
Diu is a 13.8 km by 4.6 km island (area about 40 km^{2}) at the south tip of Gujarat. The island is separated from the mainland by a narrow channel running through a swamp. The channel could only be used by fishing boats and small craft. No bridges crossed the channels at the time of hostilities. The Portuguese garrison in Diu was headed by Major Fernando de Almeida e Vasconcelos (district governor and military commander), with around 400 soldiers and police officers, organised as the battlegroup "António da Silveira".

Diu was attacked on 18 December from the north west along Kob Forte by two companies of the 20th Rajput Battalion—with the capture of the Diu Airfield being the primary objective—and from the northeast along Gogal and Amdepur by the Rajput B Company and the 4th Madras Battalion.

These Indian Army units ignored requests from Wing Commander M.P.O. "Micky" Blake, planning-in-charge of the Indian Air Force operations in Diu, to attack only on first light when close air support would be available. The Portuguese defences repulsed the attack backed by 87.6mm artillery and mortars, inflicting heavy losses on the Indians. The first attack was made by the 4th Madras on a police border post at 01:30 on 18 December at Gogol and was repulsed by 13 Portuguese police officers. Another attempt by the 4th Madras at 02:00 was again repulsed, this time backed with Portuguese 87.5mm artillery and mortar which suffered due to poor quality of munitions. By 04:00, ten of the original 13 Portuguese defenders at Gogol had been wounded and were evacuated to a hospital. At 05:30, the Portuguese artillery launched a fresh attack on the 4th Madras assaulting Gogol and forced their retreat.

Meanwhile, at 03:00, two companies of the 20th Rajput attempted to cross a muddy swamp separating them from the Portuguese forces at Passo Covo under cover of dark on rafts made of bamboo cots tied to oil barrels. The attempt was to establish a bridgehead and capture the airfield. This attack was repulsed, with losses on the Indian side, by a well entrenched unit of Portuguese soldiers armed with small automatic weapons, sten guns as well as light and medium machine guns. According to Indian sources this unit included between 125 and 130 soldiers, but according to Portuguese sources this post was defended by only eight soldiers, but this number does not support the total number of weapon operators.

As the Rajputs reached the middle of the creek, the Portuguese on Diu opened fire with two medium and two light machine-guns, capsizing some of the rafts. Major Mal Singh of the Indian Army along with five men pressed on his advance and crossed the creek. On reaching the far bank, he and his men assaulted the light machine gun trenches at Fort-De-Cova and eliminated the weapon operators. The Portuguese medium machine gun fire from another position wounded the officer and two of his men. However, with the efforts of company Havildar Major Mohan Singh and two other men, the three wounded were evacuated back across the creek to safety. As dawn approached, the Portuguese increased the intensity of fire and the battalion's water crossing equipment suffered extensive damage. As a result, the Indian battalion was ordered to fall back to Kob village by first light.

Another assault at 05:00 was similarly repulsed by the Portuguese defenders. At 06:30, Portuguese forces retrieved rafts abandoned by the 20th Rajput, recovered ammunition left behind and rescued a wounded Indian soldier, who was given treatment.

At 07:00, with the onset of dawn, Indian air strikes began, forcing the Portuguese to retreat from Passo Covo to the town of Malala. By 09:00 the Portuguese unit at Gogol also retreated, allowing the Rajput B Company (who replaced the 4th Madras) to advance under heavy artillery fire and occupy the town. By 10:15, the Indian cruiser INS Delhi, anchored off Diu, began to bombard targets on the shore. At 12:45, Indian jets fired a rocket at a mortar at Diu Fortress causing a fire near a munitions dump, forcing the Portuguese to order the evacuation of the fortress—a task completed by 14:15 under heavy bombardment from India.

At 18:00, the Portuguese commanders agreed in a meeting that in view of repeated military advances with naval and air strikes, along with the inability to establish contact with headquarters in Goa or Lisbon, there was no way to pursue an effective defence and decided to surrender to the Indian military. On 19 December, by 12:00, the Portuguese formally surrendered. 403 prisoners were taken, which included the Governor of the island along with 18 officers and 43 sergeants. Seven Portuguese soldiers had been killed in the battle.

When surrendering to the Indians, the Diu Governor stated that he could have stalled the army's advances for a few days to weeks, but he had no answer to the Indian Air Force and Navy. The Indian Air Force was also present at the ceremony and was represented by Gp Capt Godkhindi, Wing Cmdr Micky Blake and Sqn Ldr Nobby Clarke.

Major Mal Singh and Sepoy Hakam Singh of the Indian Army were awarded Ashoka Chakra (Class III).

On 19 December, the 4th Madras C Company landed on the island of Pani Khota off Diu, where a group of 13 Portuguese soldiers surrendered to them there.

==== The Diu air raids ====
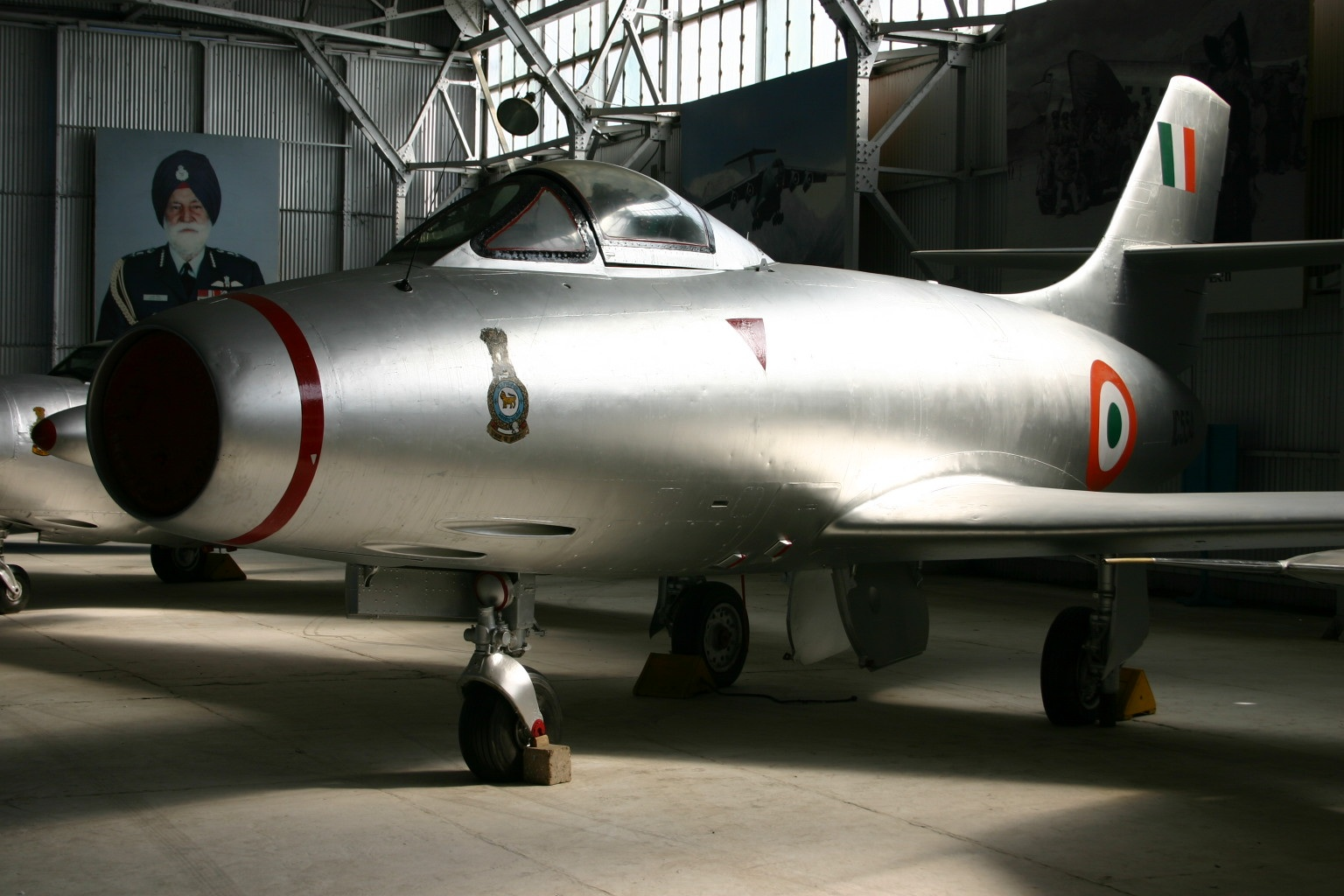
Dassault MD450 Ouragan of the Indian Air Force, this type of aircraft formed the backbone of the air strikes on Diu.

The Indian air operations in the Diu Sector were entrusted to the Armaments Training Wing led by Wg Cdr Micky Blake. The first air attacks were made at dawn on 18 December and were aimed at destroying Diu's fortifications facing the mainland. Throughout the rest of the day, the Air Force had at least two aircraft in the air at any time, giving close support to advancing Indian infantry. During the morning, the air force attacked and destroyed Diu Airfield's ATC as well as parts of Diu Fort. On orders from Tactical Air Command located at Pune, a sortie of two Toofanis attacked and destroyed the airfield runway with 4 1000 lb Mk 9 bombs. A second sortie aimed at the runway and piloted by Wg Cdr Blake himself was aborted when Blake detected what he reported as people waving white flags. In subsequent sorties, PM Ramachandran of the Indian Air Force attacked and destroyed the Portuguese ammunition dump as well a patrol boat N.R.P. Vega that attempted to escape from Diu.

In the absence of any Portuguese air presence, Portuguese ground-based anti-aircraft units attempted to offer resistance to raids, but were overwhelmed and quickly silenced, leaving complete air superiority to India. Continued attacks forced the Portuguese governor of Diu to surrender.

==== Naval action at Diu ====
The Indian cruiser INS Delhi was anchored off the coast of Diu and fired a barrage from its 6-inch guns at the Portuguese occupied Diu Fortress. The Commanding Officer of the Indian Air Force operating in the area reported that some of the shells fired from the Delhi were bouncing off the beach and exploding on the Indian mainland. However, no casualties were reported from this.

At 04:00 on 18 December, the Portuguese patrol boat NRP Vega encountered the Delhi around 12 miles (19 km) off the coast of Diu, and was attacked with heavy machine gun fire. Staying out of range, the boat had no casualties and minimal damage, the boat withdrew to the port at Diu.

At 07:00, news was received that the Indian invasion had commenced, and the commander of the Vega, 2nd Lt Oliveira e Carmo was ordered to sail out and fight until the last round of ammunition. At 07:30 the crew of the Vega spotted two Indian aircraft led by Flt. Lt. PM Ramachandran on patrol missions and opened fire on them with the ship's 20mm Oerlikon gun. In retaliation the Indian aircraft attacked the Vega twice, killing the captain and the gunner and forcing the rest of the crew to abandon the boat and swim ashore, where they were taken prisoners of war.

== UN attempts at ceasefire ==
On 18 December 1961, a Portuguese request was made to the UN Security Council for a debate on the conflict in Goa. The request was approved when the bare minimum of seven members supported the request (the US, UK, France, Turkey, Chile, Ecuador, and Nationalist China), two opposed (the Soviet Union and Ceylon), and two abstained (the United Arab Republic and Liberia).

Opening the debate, Portugal's delegate, Vasco Vieira Garin, said that Portugal had consistently shown her peaceful intentions by refraining from any counter-action to India's numerous "provocations" on the Goan border. Garin also stated that Portuguese forces, though "vastly outnumbered by the invading forces," were putting up "stiff resistance" and "fighting a delaying action and destroying communications in order to halt the advance of the enemy." In response, India's delegate, C. S. Jha said that the "elimination of the last vestiges of colonialism in India" was an "article of faith" for the Indian people, "Security Council or no Security Council." He went on to describe Goa, Daman, and Diu as "an inalienable part of India unlawfully occupied by Portugal."

In the ensuing debate, the US delegate, Adlai Stevenson, strongly criticised India's use of force to resolve her dispute with Portugal, stressing that such resort to violent means was against the charter of the UN. He stated that condoning such acts of armed forces would encourage other nations to resort to similar solutions to their own disputes, and would lead to the death of the United Nations. In response, the Soviet delegate, Valerian Zorin, argued that the Goan question was wholly within India's domestic jurisdiction and could not be considered by the Security Council. He also drew attention to Portugal's disregard for UN resolutions calling for the granting of independence to colonial countries and peoples.

Following the debate, the delegates of Liberia, Ceylon and the U.A.R. presented a resolution which: (1) stated that "the enclaves claimed by Portugal in India constitute a threat to international peace and security and stand in the way of the unity of the Republic of India; (2) asked the security Council to reject the Portuguese charge of aggression against India; and (3) called upon Portugal "to terminate hostile action and co-operate with India in the liquidation of her colonial possessions in India." This resolution was supported only by the Soviet Union, the other seven members opposing.

After the defeat of the Afro-Asian resolution, a resolution was presented by France, Turkey, the United Kingdom and the United States which: (1) Called for the immediate cessation of hostilities; (2) Called upon India to withdraw her forces immediately to "the positions prevailing before Dec. 17, 1961." (3) Urged India and Portugal "to work out a permanent solution of their differences by peaceful means in accordance with the principles embodied in the Charter"; and (4) Requested the U.N. Secretary-General "to provide such assistance as may be appropriate."

This resolution received seven votes in favour (the four sponsors and Chile, Ecuador, and Nationalist China) and four against (the Soviet Union, Ceylon, Liberia, and the United Arab Republic). It was thus defeated by the Soviet veto. In a statement after the vote, Mr. Stevenson said that the "fateful" Goa debate might have been "the first act of a drama" which could have ended in the death of the United Nations.

== Portuguese surrender ==
By the evening of 18 December, most of Goa had been overrun by advancing Indian forces, and a large party of more than two thousand Portuguese soldiers had taken position at the military base at Alparqueiros at the entrance to the port town of Vasco da Gama. Per the Portuguese strategy code named Plano Sentinela the defending forces were to make their last stand at the harbour, holding out against the Indian soldiers until Portuguese naval reinforcements could arrive. Orders delivered from the Portuguese President called for a scorched earth policy—that Goa was to be destroyed before it was given up to India. Canadian political scientist Antonio Rangel Bandeira has argued that the sacrifice of Goa was an elaborate public relations stunt calculated to rally support for Portugal's wars in Africa.

Despite his orders from Lisbon, Governor General Manuel António Vassalo e Silva took stock of the numerical superiority of the Indian troops, as well as the food and ammunition supplies available to his forces and took the decision to surrender. He later described his orders to destroy Goa as "um sacrifício inútil" (a useless sacrifice).

In a communication to all Portuguese forces under his command, he stated, "Having considered the defence of the Peninsula of Mormugão ... from aerial, naval and ground fire of the enemy and ... having considered the difference between the forces and the resources ... the situation does not allow myself to proceed with the fight without great sacrifice of the lives of the inhabitants of Vasco da Gama, I have decided with ... my patriotism well present, to get in touch with the enemy ... I order all my forces to cease-fire."

The official Portuguese surrender was conducted in a formal ceremony held at 20:30 hours on 19 December when Governor General Manuel António Vassalo e Silva signed the instrument of surrender bringing to an end 451 years of Portuguese rule in Goa. In all, 4,668 personnel were taken prisoner by the Indian Army—a figure which included military and civilian personnel, Portuguese, Africans and Goan.

Upon the surrender of the Portuguese governor general, Goa, Daman and Diu was declared a federally administered union territory placed directly under the President of India, and Major-General K. P. Candeth was appointed as its military governor. The war had lasted two days, and had cost 22 Indian and 30 Portuguese lives.

Those Indian forces who served within the disputed territories for 48 hours, or flew at least one operational sortie during the conflict, received a General Service Medal 1947 with the Goa 1961 bar.

== Portuguese actions post-hostilities ==
When they received news of the fall of Goa, the Portuguese government formally severed all diplomatic links with India and refused to recognise the incorporation of the seized territories into the Indian Republic. An offer of Portuguese citizenship was instead made to all Goan natives who wished to emigrate to Portugal rather than remain under Indian rule. This was amended in 2006 to include only those who had been born before 19 December 1961. Later, in a show of defiance, Prime Minister Salazar's government offered a reward of US$10,000 for the capture of Brigadier Sagat Singh, the commander of the maroon berets of India's parachute regiment who were the first troops to enter Panaji, Goa's capital.

Lisbon went virtually into mourning, and Christmas celebrations were extremely muted. Cinemas and theatres shut down as tens of thousands of Portuguese marched in a silent parade from Lisbon's city hall to the cathedral, escorting the relics of St. Francis Xavier.

Salazar, while addressing the Portuguese National Assembly on 3 January 1962, invoked the principle of national sovereignty, as defined in the legal framework of the Constitution of the Estado Novo. "We can not negotiate, not without denying and betraying our own, the cession of national territory and the transfer of populations that inhabit them to foreign sovereigns," said Salazar. He went on to state that the UN's failure to halt aggression against Portugal, showed that effective power in the U.N. had passed to the Communist and Afro-Asian countries. Salazar also accused Britain of delaying for a week her reply to Portugal's request to be allowed the use of certain airfields. "Had it not been for this delay," he said, "we should certainly have found alternative routes and we could have rushed to India reinforcements in men and material for a sustained defence of the territory."

Hinting that Portugal would yet be vindicated, Salazar went on to state that "difficulties will arise for both sides when the programme of the Indianization of Goa begins to clash with its inherent culture ... It is therefore to be expected that many Goans will wish to escape to Portugal from the inevitable consequences of the invasion."

In the months after the conflict, the Portuguese Government used broadcasts on Emissora Nacional, the Portuguese national radio station, to urge Goans to resist and oppose the Indian administration. An effort was made to create clandestine resistance movements in Goa, and within Goan diaspora communities across the world to use general resistance and armed rebellion to weaken the Indian presence in Goa. The campaign had the full support of the Portuguese government with the ministries of defence, foreign affairs, army, navy and finance involved. A plan was chalked out called the 'Plano Gralha' covering Goa, Daman and Diu, which called for paralysing port operations at Mormugao and Bombay by planting bombs in some of the ships anchored at the ports.

On 20 June 1964, Casimiro Monteiro, a Portuguese PIDE agent of Goan descent, along with Ismail Dias, a Goan settled in Portugal, executed a series of bombings in Goa.

Relations between India and Portugal thawed only in 1974, when, following an anti-colonial military coup d'état and the fall of the authoritarian rule in Lisbon, Goa was finally recognised as part of India, and steps were taken to re-establish diplomatic relations with India. On 31 December 1974, a treaty was signed between India and Portugal with the Portuguese recognising full sovereignty of India over Goa, Daman, Diu, Dadra and Nagar Haveli. In 1992, Portuguese President Mário Soares became the first Portuguese head of state to visit Goa after its annexation by India, following Indian President Ramaswamy Venkataraman's visit to Portugal in 1990.

== Prisoners of war ==
After they surrendered, the Portuguese soldiers were interned by the Indian Army at their own military camps at Navelim, Aguada, Pondá and Alparqueiros under harsh conditions which included sleeping on cement floors and hard manual labour. By January 1962, most prisoners of war had been transferred to the newly established camp at Ponda where conditions were substantially better.

Portuguese non-combatants present in Goa at the surrender—which included Mrs Vassalo e Silva, wife of the Portuguese Governor General of Goa—were transported by 29 December to Mumbai, from where they were repatriated to Portugal. Manuel Vassalo e Silva, however, remained along with approximately 3,300 Portuguese combatants as prisoners in Goa.

Air Marshal Subramaniam Raghavendran, who met some of the captured Portuguese soldiers, wrote in his memoirs several years later "I have never seen such a set of troops looking so miserable in my life. Short, not particularly well built and certainly very unsoldierlike."

In one incident, recounted by Lieutenant Francisco Cabral Couto (now retired general), on 19 March 1962 some of the prisoners tried to escape the Ponda camp in a rubbish lorry. The attempt was foiled, and the Portuguese officers in charge of the escapees were threatened with court martial and execution. This situation was defused by the intervention of Ferreira da Silva, a Jesuit military chaplain. Following the foiled escape attempt, Captain Carlos Azeredo (now retired general) was beaten with rifle butts by four Indian soldiers while a gun was pointed at him, on the orders of Captain Naik, the 2nd Camp Commander. The beating was in retaliation for Azeredo's telling Captain Naik to "Go to Hell", and was serious enough to make him lose consciousness and cause severe contusions. Captain Naik was later punished by the Indian Army for violating the Geneva Convention.

During the internment of the Portuguese prisoners of war at various camps around Goa, the prisoners were visited by large numbers of Goans—described by Captain Azeredo as "Goan friends, acquaintances, or simply anonymous persons"—who offered the internees cigarettes, biscuits, tea, medicines and money. This surprised the Indian military authorities, who first limited the visits to twice a week, and then only to representatives of the Red Cross.

The captivity lasted for six months "thanks to the stupid stubbornness of Lisbon" (according to Azeredo). The Portuguese Government insisted that the prisoners be repatriated by Portuguese aircraft—a demand that was rejected by the Indian Government who instead insisted on aircraft from a neutral country. The negotiations were delayed even further when Salazar ordered the detention of 1,200 Indians in Mozambique allegedly as a bargaining chip in exchange for Portuguese prisoners.

By May 1962, most of the prisoners had been repatriated—being first flown to Karachi, Pakistan, in chartered French aircraft, and then sent off to Lisbon by three ships: Vera Cruz, Pátria and Moçambique. On arrival at the Tejo in Portugal, returning Portuguese servicemen were taken into custody by military police at gunpoint without immediate access to their families who had arrived to receive them. Following intense questioning and interrogations, the officers were charged with direct insubordination on having refused to comply with directives not to surrender. On 22 March 1963, the governor general, the military commander, his chief of staff, one naval captain, six majors, a sublieutenant and a sergeant were cashiered by the council of ministers for cowardice and expelled from military service. Four captains, four lieutenants and a lieutenant commander were suspended for six months.

Ex-governor Manuel António Vassalo e Silva had a hostile reception when he returned to Portugal. He was subsequently court martialled for failing to follow orders, expelled from the military and sent into exile. He returned to Portugal in 1974, after the fall of the regime, and was given back his military status. He was later able to conduct a state visit to Goa, where he was given a warm reception.

== International reactions ==
=== Support ===
==== African states ====
Before the invasion the press speculated about international reaction to military action and recalled the recent charge by African nations that India was "too soft" on Portugal and was thus "dampening the enthusiasm of freedom fighters in other countries". Many African countries, themselves former European colonies, reacted positively to the Indian operation. Radio Ghana termed it as the "Liberation of Goa" and went on to state that the people of Ghana would "long for the day when our downtrodden brethren in Angola and other Portuguese territories in Africa are liberated." Adelino Gwambe, the leader of the Mozambique National Democratic Union stated: "We fully support the use of force against Portuguese butchers."

In the Summer of 1961, the Portuguese enclave of Fort of São João Baptista de Ajudá was annexed by the Republic of Dahomey (now Benin). Portugal, following the Carnation Revolution and overthrow of Estado Novo, recognised the annexation in 1974. The seizure of this fortress was something of a foretelling tale for Portuguese policy in abandoning Goa, as following the notice that the fortress was under assault, PM Salazar ordered the construction to be set on fire prior to abandonment.

Liberia insisted that Goa was not Portuguese territory but a non-self-governing territory, while condemning "Portuguese domination over Indian people for five and a half centuries".

==== Soviet Union ====
The future leader of the Soviet Union, Leonid Brezhnev, who was touring India at the time of the war, made several speeches applauding the operation. In a farewell message, he urged Indians to ignore Western indignation as it came "from those who are accustomed to strangle the peoples striving for independence ... and from those who enrich themselves from colonialist plunder". Nikita Khrushchev, the de facto Soviet leader, telegraphed Nehru stating that there was "unanimous acclaim" from every Soviet citizen for "Friendly India". The USSR had earlier vetoed a UN Security Council resolution condemning the Indian annexation of Goa.

==== Arab states ====
The United Arab Republic expressed its full support for India's "legitimate efforts to regain its occupied territory". A Moroccan government spokesman said that "India has been extraordinarily patient and a non-violent country has been driven to violence by Portugal"; while Tunisia's Secretary of State for Foreign Affairs of Tunisia, Sadok Mokaddem expressed the hope that "the liberation of Goa will bring nearer the end of the Portuguese colonial regime in Africa." Similar expressions of support for India were forthcoming from other Arab countries.

==== Ceylon ====
Full support for India's action was expressed in Ceylon, where Prime Minister Sirimavo Bandaranaike issued an order on 18 December directing that "transport carrying troops and equipment for the Portuguese in Goa shall not be permitted the use of Ceylon's seaports and airports." Ceylon went on, along with delegates from Liberia and the United Arab Republic, to present a resolution in the UN in support of India's annexation of Goa. Ceylon argued that as Goa had been taken by force from India, it was entitled to use force in turn.

==== Indonesia ====
Indonesia expressed their support and termed it a fight against colonialism. A foreign ministry spokesperson in Jakarta stated: "We know India is a peace-loving nation which has been compelled to use force. There can be no compromise with colonialism."

=== Condemnation ===
==== United States ====
The United States' official reaction to the annexation of Goa was delivered by Adlai Stevenson in the United Nations Security Council, where he condemned the armed action of the Indian government and demanded that all Indian forces be unconditionally withdrawn from Goan soil.

To express its displeasure with India's operation in Goa, the US Senate Foreign Relations Committee attempted, over the objections of President John F. Kennedy, to cut the 1962 foreign aid appropriation to India by 25 percent.

Referring to the perception, especially in the West, that India had previously been lecturing the world about the virtues of nonviolence, President Kennedy told the Indian ambassador to the US, "You spend the last fifteen years preaching morality to us, and then you go ahead and act the way any normal country would behave ... People are saying, the preacher has been caught coming out of the brothel."

In an article titled "India, The Aggressor", The New York Times on 19 December 1961, stated "With his invasion of Goa Prime Minister Nehru has done irreparable damage to India's good name and to the principles of international morality." The American press generally construed the war cynically, as a hypocritical and politically motivated action by Menon, with Time dubbing the annexation 'Menon's war' and writing:

THE man most widely held responsible for India's conquest of Goa is not Jawaharlal Nehru, but Nehru's abrasive, acerbic Defense Minister, Vengalil Krishnan Krishna Menon, who apparently provided the necessary push to overcome his master's remaining scruples. With elections due in February, Nehru and Menon have been under continuous harassment from Indian leftists for not expelling the Portuguese "imperialists" and from moderates and rightists for ignoring Red China's new incursions on India's northern frontier. Acting against Goa was one way to cover up inaction against China. Moreover, Menon's own parliamentary seat was in danger, and shrewd Indian political opinion held that Menon could only win if he made himself popular by "solving" the Goa situation. TIME Magazine, Friday, Dec. 29, 1961

Life International, in its issue dated 12 February 1962, carried an article titled "Symbolic pose by Goa's Governor" in which it expressed its vehement condemnation of the military action.

The world's initial outrage at pacifist India's resort to military violence for conquest has subsided into resigned disdain. And in Goa, a new Governor strikes a symbolic pose before portraits of men who had administered the prosperous Portuguese enclave for 451 years. He is K. P. Candeth, commanding India's 17th Infantry Division, and as the very model of a modern major general, he betrayed no sign that he is finding Goans less than happy about their "liberation". Goan girls refuse to dance with Indian officers. Goan shops have been stripped bare by luxury-hungry Indian soldiers, and Indian import restrictions prevent replacement. Even in India, doubts are heard. "India", said respected Chakravarti Rajagopalachari, leader of the Swatantra Party, "has totally lost the moral power to raise her voice against the use of military power"

— "Symbolic pose by Goa's Governor", Life International, 12 February 1962

==== United Kingdom ====
Commonwealth Relations Secretary, Duncan Sandys told the House of Commons on 18 December 1961 that while the UK Government had long understood the desire of the local Indians to incorporate Goa, Daman, and Diu in the Indian Republic, and their feeling of impatience that the Portuguese Government had not followed the example of Britain and France in relinquishing their Indian possessions, he had to "make it plain that H.M. Government deeply deplores the decision of the Government of India to use military force to attain its political objectives."

The Leader of the Opposition in the House of Commons Hugh Gaitskell of the Labour Party also expressed "profound regret" that India should have resorted to force in her dispute with Portugal, although the Opposition recognised that the existence of Portuguese colonies on the Indian mainland had long been an anachronism and that Portugal should have abandoned them long since in pursuance of the example set by Britain and France. Permanent Representative of the United Kingdom to the United Nations, Sir Patrick Dean, stated in the UN that Britain had been "shocked and dismayed" at the outbreak of hostilities.

==== Netherlands ====
A Foreign Ministry spokesman in The Hague regretted that India, "of all countries," had resorted to force to gain her ends, particularly as India had always championed the principles of the U.N. Charter and consistently opposed the use of force to achieve national purposes. Fears were expressed in the Dutch press lest the operation on Goa might encourage Indonesia to make a similar attack on West New Guinea. On 27 December 1961, Dutch ambassador to the United States, Herman Van Roijen asked the US government if their military support in the form of the USN's 7th Fleet would be forthcoming in case of such an attack.

==== Brazil ====
The Brazilian government's reaction to the annexation of Goa was one of staunch support with Portugal, reflecting earlier statements by Brazilian presidents that their country stood firmly with Portugal anywhere in the world and that ties between Brazil and Portugal were built on ties of blood and sentiment. Former Brazilian President Juscelino Kubitschek, and long time friend and supporter of Portuguese PM Salazar, stated to Indian PM Nehru that "Seventy million Brazilians could never understand, nor accept, an act of violence against Goa." In a speech in Rio de Janeiro on 10 June 1962, Brazilian congressman and sociologist Gilberto Freyre commented on the annexation of Goa by declaring that "a Portuguese wound is Brazilian pain".

Shortly after the conflict, the new Brazilian ambassador to India, Mário Guimarães, stated to the Portuguese ambassador to Greece that it was "necessary for the Portuguese to comprehend that the age of colonialism is over". Guimarães dismissed the Portuguese ambassador's argument that Portuguese colonialism was based on race-mixing and the creation of multiracial societies, stating that this was "not enough of a reason to prevent independence".

==== Pakistan ====
In a statement released on 18 December, the Pakistani Foreign Ministry spokesman described the operation on Goa as "naked militarism". The statement emphasised that Pakistan stood for the settlement of international disputes by negotiation through the United Nations and stated that the proper course was a "U.N.-sponsored plebiscite to elicit from the people of Goa their wishes on the future of the territory." The Pakistani statement (issued on 18 December) continued: "The world now knows that India has double standards ... . One set of principles seem to apply to India, another set to non-India. This is one more demonstration of the fact that India remains violent and aggressive at heart, whatever the pious statements made from time to time by its leaders."

"The lesson from the Indian action on Goa is of practical interest on the question of Kashmir. Certainly the people of Kashmir could draw inspiration from what the Indians are reported to have stated in the leaflets they dropped... on Goa. The leaflets stated that it was India's task to 'defend the honour and security of the Motherland from which the people of Goa had been separated far too long' and which the people of Goa, largely by their own efforts could again make their own. We hope the Indians will apply the same logic to Kashmir. Now the Indians can impress their electorate with having achieved military glory. The mask is off. Their much-proclaimed theories of non-violence, secularism, and democratic methods stand exposed."

In a letter to the US president on 2 January 1962, Pakistani President General Ayub Khan stated: "My Dear President, The forcible taking of Goa by India has demonstrated what we in Pakistan have never had any illusions about—that India would not hesitate to attack if it were in her interest to do so and if she felt that the other side was too weak to resist."

=== Ambivalence ===
==== People's Republic of China ====
In an official statement issued on 19 December, the Chinese government stressed its "resolute support" for the struggle of the people of Asia, Africa and Latin America against "imperialist colonialism". However, the Hong Kong Communist newspaper Ta Kung Pao described Indian actions as "a desperate attempt by Mr. Nehru to regain his sagging prestige among the Afro-Asian nations." The Ta Kung Pao article – published before the statement from the Chinese Government – conceded that Goa was legitimately part of Indian territory and that the Indian people were entitled to take whatever measures were necessary to recover it. At the same time, however, the paper ridiculed Mr. Nehru for choosing "the world's tiniest imperialist country" to achieve his aim and asserted that "internal unrest, the failure of Nehru's anti-China campaign, and the forthcoming election forced him to take action against Goa to please the Indian people."

==== The Catholic Church ====
The Roman Catholic Archbishop of Goa and Daman and Patriarch of the East Indies was always a Portuguese-born cleric; at the time of the annexation, José Vieira Alvernaz was archbishop, and days earlier Dom José Pedro da Silva had been nominated by the Holy See as coadjutor bishop with right to succeed Alvernaz. After the annexation, Silva remained in Portugal and was never consecrated; in 1965 he became Bishop of Viseu in Portugal. Alvernaz retired to the Azores but remained titular Patriarch until resigning in 1975 after Portuguese recognition of the 1961 annexation.

Although the Vatican did not voice its reaction to the annexation of Goa, it delayed the appointment of a native head of the Goan Church until the inauguration of the Second Vatican Council in Rome, when Msgr Francisco Xavier da Piedade Rebelo was consecrated Bishop and Vicar Apostolic of Goa in 1963. He was succeeded by Raul Nicolau Gonçalves in 1972, who became the first native-born Patriarch in 1978.

== Legality ==
Quincy Wright wrote that India's actions were of "legal importance" as "it indicated a major difference between the East and the West in the interpretation" of UN law.

Upon independence in 1947, India had accorded recognition to the Portuguese sovereignty over Goa. After annexing Goa, India's case was built around the illegality of colonial acquisitions. This argument was correct according to the legal norms of the twentieth century, but did not hold to the standards of sixteenth century international law. India gained sympathy from much of the international community, but this did not, however, signify any legal support for the invasion. The Supreme Court of India recognised the validity of the annexation and rejected the continued applicability of the law of occupation. In a treaty with retroactive effect, Portugal recognised Indian sovereignty in 1974. Alina Kaczorowska-Ireland argues that, under the jus cogens rule, forceful annexations including the annexation of Goa are held as illegal since they have taken place after the UN Charter came into force. A later treaty cannot justify it. Sharon Korman argues that the principle of self-determination may bend the rule to accommodate the new reality but it will not change the illegal aspect of the original annexation.

== See also ==
- Cuncolim Revolt
- Goa Inquisition
- Goa liberation movement
- History of Goa
- NRP Afonso de Albuquerque (1934)
- Portuguese Colonial War
- Portuguese Conquest of Goa (1510)
- Portuguese India
- Portuguese Indian escudo
- Portuguese Indian rupia
- 12th Amendment of the Constitution of India
- Indonesian invasion of East Timor
- Handover of Macau
