= Dabolim Airport =

Airport serving Goa, India

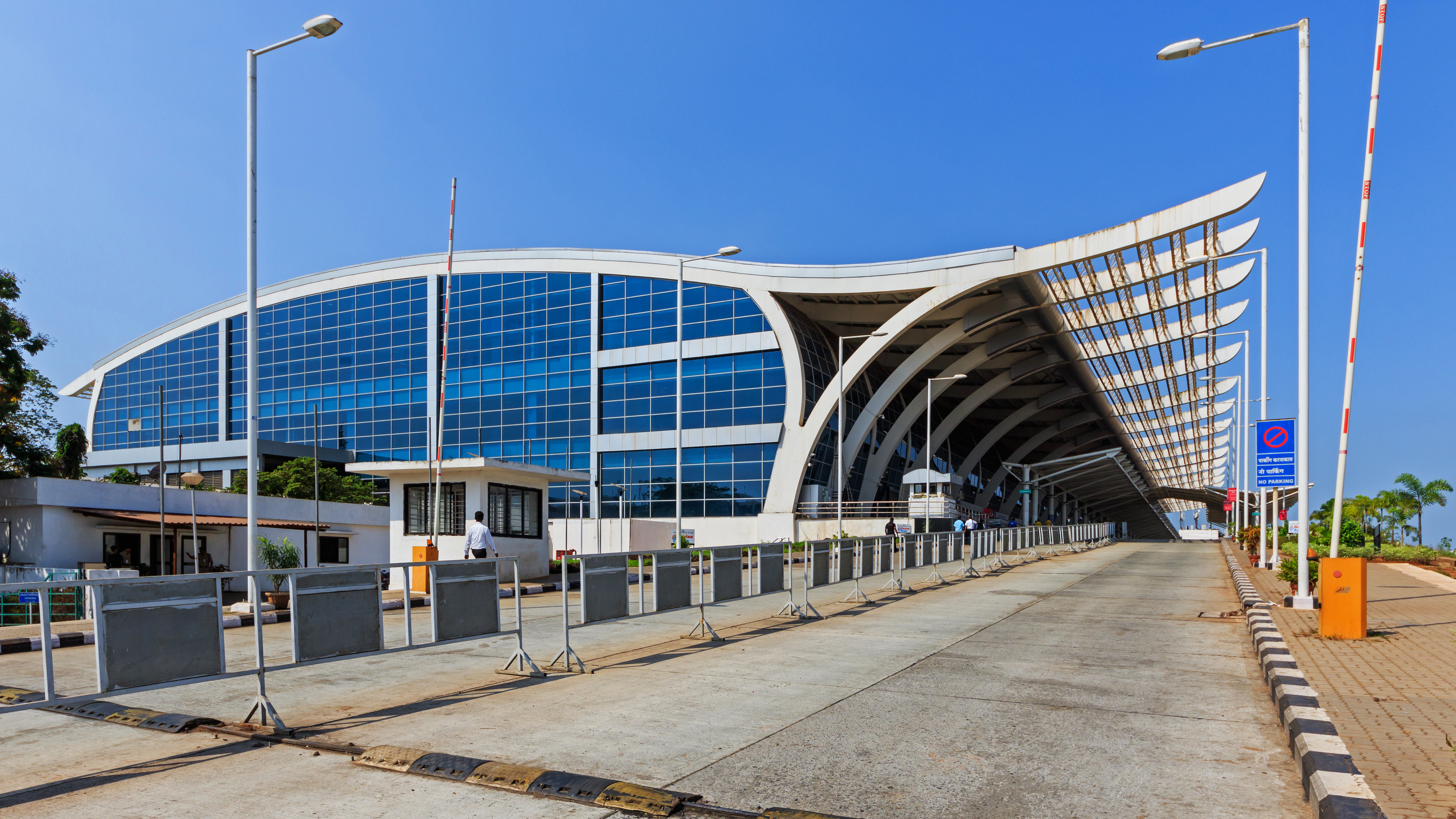
- IATA: GOI; ICAO: VOGO; WMO: 43194

Summary
- Airport type: Military/Public
- Owner: Government of Goa; Indian Navy
- Operator: Airports Authority of India
- Serves: Goa
- Location: Dabolim, Panaji, Goa, India
- Opened: 1955; 71 years ago
- Focus city for: Air India Express; IndiGo
- Elevation AMSL: 56 m (184 ft)
- Coordinates: 15°22′51″N 073°49′53″E
- Website: Goa Airport

Maps
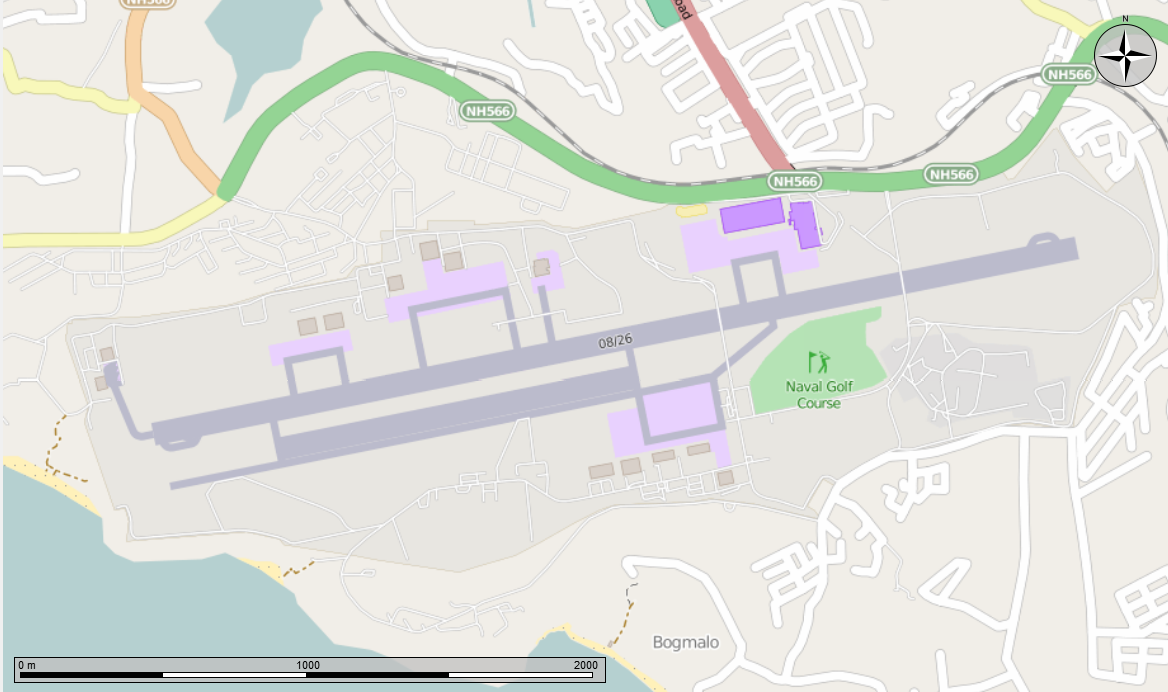
- Map of Dabolim Airport

- Location within Goa Location within India

Runways
| Direction | Length | | Surface |
| Direction | m | ft | Surface |
|---|---|---|---|
| 08/26 | 3,430 | 11,253 | Asphalt |

Statistics (April 2025 – March 2026)
- Passengers: 61,26,944 (▼15.4%)
- Aircraft movements: 38,127 (▼15.2%)
- Cargo tonnage: 6,066.8 (▲11.1%)
- Source: AAI

Dabolim Airport (IATA: GOI, ICAO: VOGO) is an international airport serving Panaji, the capital of the state of Goa, India. It is operated by the Airports Authority of India (AAI) as a civil enclave in an Indian Navy naval airbase named INS Hansa. The airport is located in Dabolim, in South Goa district, 4 km (2.5 mi) from the nearest city of Vasco da Gama, 23 km (14 mi) from Margao, and about 30 km (19 mi) from the state capital, Panaji.

The airport's integrated terminal was inaugurated in December 2013. It was designed by Creative Group, an India-based architecture firm. In fiscal year 2024-25, the airport handled over 7.2 million passengers. Since fiscal year 2023-24, the airport has been witnessing decline in passenger, air and cargo traffic, due to the excess traffic taken by the new airport as the second airport of the state. Several European charter airlines fly to Goa seasonally, typically between November and May. Until 2022, flights from the UK (London Gatwick Airport and Manchester Airport) were operated by TUI Airways and Air India, which operated on a daily basis, before both the airlines shifted to the new airport in 2023 to relieve the growing excess traffic in this airport. As of 2025, there are also several seasonal charter flights to various Russian cities.

Because of capacity constraints at the terminal and air traffic congestion due to the military and naval presence, a second airport at Mopa was proposed. It completed its construction on 11 December 2022, with operations starting from 5 January 2023. It is located approximately 60 km (37 mi) from Dabolim Airport.

== History ==
The airport was built in 1955 by the Government of the Portuguese State of India, on 249 acres (101 ha) of land, as the Aeroporto de Dabolim, which was later officially renamed Aeroporto General Bénard Guedes. Until 1961, the airport served as the main hub of the Portuguese India's airline TAIP (Transportes Aéreos da Índia Portuguesa), which on a regular schedule served Daman, Diu, Karachi, Mozambique, Portuguese Timor, and other destinations.

During the Annexation of Goa, in December 1961, the airport was bombarded by the Indian Air Force with parts of the infrastructure being destroyed. Two civilian planes that were in the airport – a Lockheed Constellation from TAP (Transportes Aéreos Portugueses) and a Douglas DC-4 from TAIP – managed to escape with refugees, during the night, to Karachi. In April 1962, it was occupied by the Indian Navy's air wing when Major General K. P. Candeth, who had led the successful military operation into Goa, "handed over" the airport to the Indian Navy before relinquishing charge as its military governor to a Lieutenant Governor of the then Union Territory of Goa, Daman and Diu in June 1962.

For civilian air travel out of Vasco da Gama and Goa, the Indian Navy and the Government of India invited the public sector airline (known now as Indian) to operate at Dabolim from 1966 after the runway was repaired and jet-enabled. A new domestic terminal building was built in 1983, designed to process 350 arrivals and departures simultaneously, while the international terminal, built in 1996 was designed for 250.

Once two vital road bridges across the main waterways of Goa were built in the early 1980s, and Goa hosted the Commonwealth Heads of Government Meeting (CHOGM) in 1983, the charter flight business began to take off at Dabolim a few years later, pioneered by Condor Airlines of Germany.

In 2006, the Indian Civil Aviation Ministry announced a plan to upgrade Dabolim Airport. This involved constructing a new international passenger terminal (after converting the existing one to domestic) and adding several more aircraft stands over an area of about 4 hectares (9.9 acres). The construction was scheduled to be completed by the end of 2007. However delays in transfer of the required land from the Navy held up proceedings.

The modernisation project of Dabolim Airport was one of 35 airport expansion projects undertaken by the AAI and, in terms of size and money, was its third largest project after the ones at Chennai and Kolkata airports. It included the construction of an integrated terminal building to replace the older terminals, a multi-level car parking (MLCP) facility to accommodate between 540 and 570 cars and construction of additional parking stands for aircraft. The AAI acquired additional land from the Indian Navy and the State Government for apron expansion and the expansion of the older international terminal building complex. The foundation stone for the terminal was laid on 21 February 2009, the project work began in May 2010 and construction of the terminal began in May 2011. The terminal can handle 2,750 peak hour passengers, cost ₹3.45 billion and was inaugurated on 3 December 2013.

Due to rising passenger traffic, restrictions over the airport on night flights by the Navy and no scope to expand the airport due to space and navy limitations, an alternative airport, Manohar International Airport, has been built at Mopa, North Goa district. It has been built specially to help relieve the growing pressure on Dabolim Airport and to connect the state of Goa and its adjoining regions with more international destinations to increase tourism. It was inaugurated by Prime Minister Narendra Modi on 11 December 2022 and flight operations began on 5 January 2023. The new airport has already connected many domestic destinations, which previously did not have any connection/s with Goa. To carry international traffic to and from the new airport, some airlines like Aeroflot, Oman Air and TUI Airways will shift their operations from Dabolim Airport by the end of 2023. Air India shifted its London flights to the new airport, which is at present the only regular European destination from Goa, on 21 July 2023, thus making it the first international airline to operate to and from the new airport.

== Economic factors ==
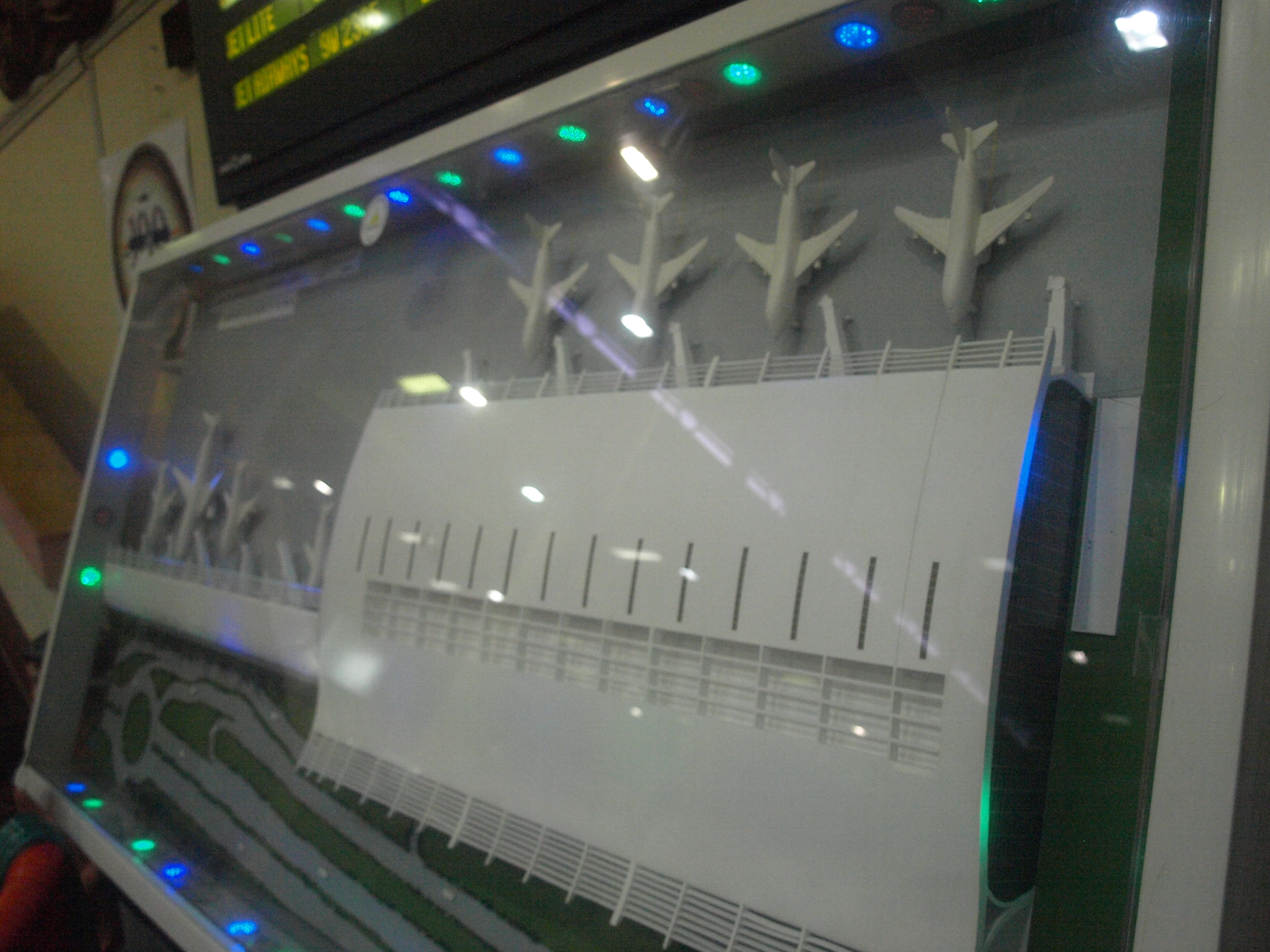
Model of the new integrated terminal building on display

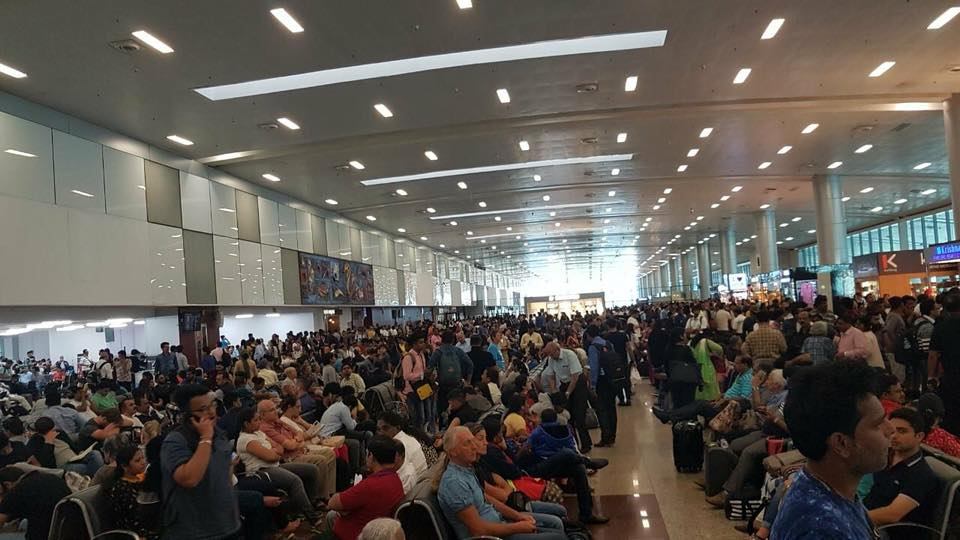
Departure area at Dabolim Airport

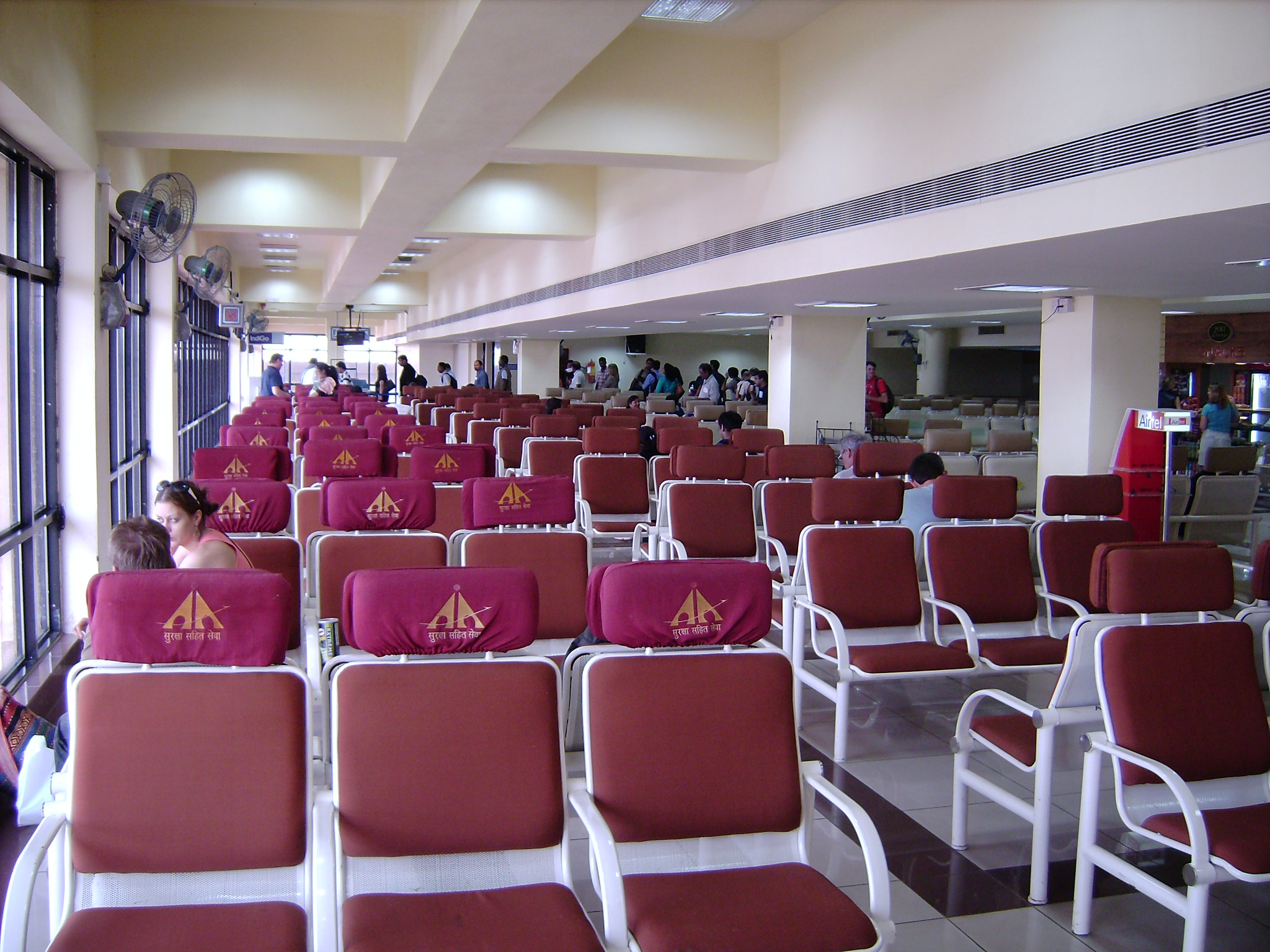
Waiting hall on the second floor of the old terminal

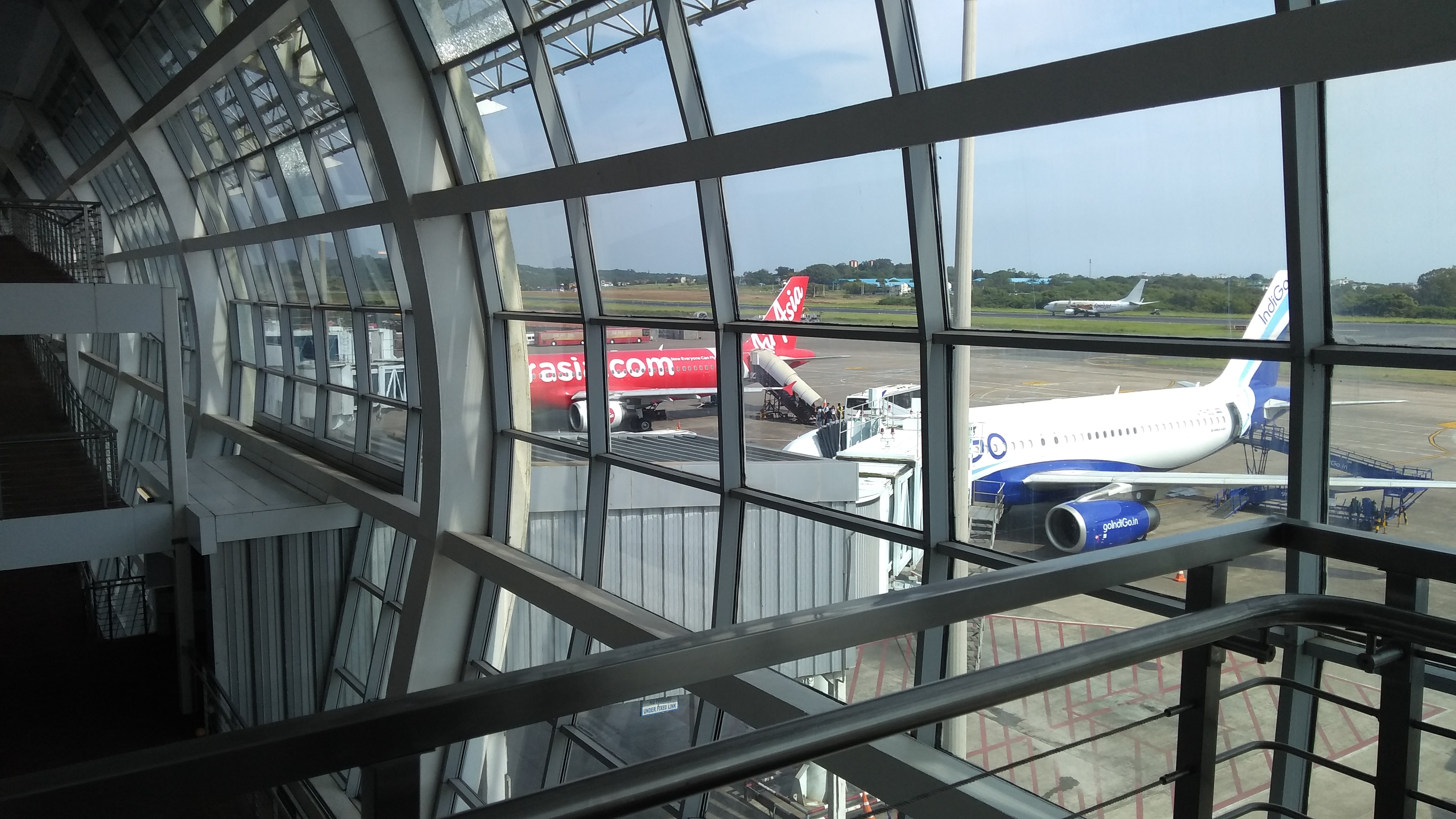
Apron view

Dabolim's air traffic control is in the hands of the Indian Navy, which earns revenues from this service on account of aircraft movements. Landing fees are of the order of ₹17,000 (US$180) each while Route Navigation Facility (RNF) Charges are about ₹7,400 (US$79). The Airports Authority of India could be eligible for aircraft parking fees of ₹10,000 (US$110) per day. It receives a part of the passenger service fee which is shared between it and the Central Industrial Security Force (CISF). The AAI's prime source of earning is from non-traffic services like passenger facilitation, car park, entry tickets, stalls, restaurants, and shops at the main terminal building and advertising boards.

Capital expenditures (such as for runway expansion) at the airport are covered by AAI. The Dabolim Airport runway has increased from about 6,000 feet (1,829 m) initially to 11,345 feet (3,458 m) as of April 2013 and can accommodate Boeing 747s. There is a shortage of night parking bays which are at a premium in metro airports like Mumbai. A local association has estimated that about 40 hectares are needed for the civil enclave in comparison to the 14 hectares earmarked at present.

== Facilities ==
=== Structure ===
The airport is spread over 688 hectares (1,700 acres) (and possibly 745 hectares or 1,840 acres) and consists of a civil enclave of nearly 14 hectares (35 acres), an increase from its original size of 6 hectares (15 acres). The civil enclave is operated by the AAI. Of the 180 flights daily, there is a very large concentration of civilian traffic in the period between 1:00 pm and 9:00 pm during weekdays, with the balance in the early morning hours. This is because of naval restrictions for military flight training purposes throughout the year. In September 2017, the AAI and the Indian Navy entered into a Memorandum of understanding (MoU) to construct a full-length, parallel taxi track suitable for Boeing 747 type of aircraft and agreed to share the cost of construction. The environmental clearance for the project was received in January 2018. The project, which involved development of a 3,710 metre long parallel taxi track along with associated facilities, would be completed in three phases. The first phase was completed by November 2019. The completed taxiway was opened in December 2019. It raised the capacity of the runway from 15 air traffic movements (ATMs) per hour to 18-20 ATMs per hour.

The Navy's premises straddle the Dabolim runway and consequently its personnel would cross the runway at one point (on foot or bicycles or in vehicles) between flights. As part of the works taken up in 2018, a peripheral road was built and the local traffic would no longer affect flight movement.

=== Terminal ===
The airport's integrated terminal building handles both international and domestic passengers. It was opened in December 2013. The building design features aesthetic glass, large steel span structures, and frameless glazing. The 36,000 square metre terminal is designed to cater to five million passengers annually. It is equipped with eight aerobridges. The terminal features an in-line baggage scanning system and a state-of-the-art sewage treatment plant. It has 75 check-in counters, 22 immigration counters for departures, 18 immigration counters for arrivals, 14 security check booths, and eight customs counters. The basement of the four-level terminal has utilities like electricity and cargo handling. The check-in counters are placed on the ground floor while the first floor has security check booths. The second floor has the security hold area where passengers may wait before boarding an aircraft.

The old terminal buildings were closed after the commissioning of the new terminal.

== Airlines and destinations ==
The following airlines operate regular scheduled and charter flights from Dabolim Airport:

| Airlines | Destinations |
|---|---|
| Aeroflot | Seasonal: Moscow-Sheremetyevo |
| Air India | Ahmedabad, Bengaluru, Delhi, Mumbai |
| Air India Express | Bengaluru, Chennai, Delhi, Dubai–International, Ghaziabad, Hyderabad, Kolkata, Mumbai, Surat |
| Alliance Air | Bengaluru, Hyderabad, Indore, Mumbai |
| Azur Air | Seasonal charter: Perm |
| FlyArystan | Seasonal charter: Astana |
| Gulf Air | Bahrain |
| IndiGo | Ahmedabad, Bengaluru, Bhopal, Chandigarh, Chennai, Coimbatore, Delhi, Hyderabad, Indore, Kochi, Kolkata, Lucknow, Mumbai, Nashik, Navi Mumbai, Pune, Raipur, Surat |
| SCAT Airlines | Seasonal charter: Almaty |

== Statistics ==
Statistics for Goa International Airport
| Year | Total passengers | % change |
|---|---|---|
| 2016 | 6,434,790 | ▲16.46% |
| 2015 | 5,375,555 | ▲19.1% |
| 2014 | 4,513,201 | ▲16.2% |
| 2013 | 3,999,535 | ▲12.9% |
| 2012 | 3,542,747 | ▲0.6% |

By 2005, total passengers had increased to 987,700 (1944 domestic plus 762 international passengers per day, year unspecified). The figure for 2004–05 was placed at nearly 1.3 million, giving a daily average of 3,467. The airport director has claimed that 2.2 million passengers used the airport in CY 2006. This rose to about 2.6 million in CY 2007. The airport is ranked among the top ten in the country in terms of passenger traffic. Airport authorities consider that it has been operating at saturation levels since 2004.

Today, Goa's estimated 1200 international flights per year account for some 93% of India's international charter tourist flights. It is estimated that about 300 to 350 thousand international tourists arrive at Dabolim on charter flights. Goa's total international tourists (roughly double the charter passengers) account for 5–10% of the national figure and 10–15% of the country's foreign exchange receipts from tourism. As the weekend morning hours approach saturation due to waves of chartered flights especially from the United Kingdom and Russia, attention is shifting to the night and early morning hours of weekdays for accommodating such flights. Tourists from UK to Goa by air were estimated to number about 300,000 in 2013–14 while those from Russia numbered about 49,000 (by 280 charter flights) in the same period.

== Naval station at Dabolim ==
INS Hansa is India's biggest naval airbase. The air station of the Indian Navy at Dabolim was transferred here from the Sulur Air Force Base in Coimbatore after the liberation of Goa from colonial Portuguese rule in December 1961. In 1983, the Indian Navy began inducting the BAE Sea Harrier into service, basing training activities at Dabolim.

The Harriers were replaced by MiG-29KUBs in 2016. INS Hansa is also the site of Asia's first Shore Based Test Facility (SBTF), built in 2014 to train pilots of the MiG-29K for the aircraft carrier INS Vikramaditya.

INS Hansa is home to several squadrons of the Indian Navy, operating aircraft such as Mikoyan MiG-29Ks, Kamov Ka-28s, Ilyushin Il-38s, Dornier 228s. The Navy's Sagar Pawan aerobatic team is also based at Dabolim.

Apart from being a naval airbase, INS Hansa hosts the Coast Guard Air Enclave (CGAE) - Goa and also sees regular exercises by Indian Air Force aircraft. The Navy also operates a naval aviation museum near Dabolim Airport.

=== Military flight training ===
Military flight training at Dabolim is carried out on five days of the week from 0830 hrs to 1300 hrs, during which civilian flights cannot operate. Some exceptions have been made on rare occasions by the naval ATC, chiefly in the case of foreign airlines. Charter airlines carrying international tourists during the season tend to use the freer civil aviation regimes on weekends (Saturday and Sunday) and in the early morning hours. The blocked time is about 15% of the total on a weekly basis albeit during peak morning hours for civilian flights.

=== Campaign to revert to civilian status ===
There has been a demand in local political circles for the restoration of Dabolim's civilian status by relocating the Indian Navy' air station to the proposed Karwar airfield in the new INS Kadamba naval base at Karwar, 70 kilometres (43 mi) south of Dabolim in the adjoining state of Karnataka. However, the Indian Navy's top officers in Goa have hinted that the investment at Dabolim naval air station is ₹7.5 billion (US$80 million) and that it would be impossible to replicate this at Karwar.

In early 2007, there were reports of a concerted move by the Navy, the AAI, and the state of Karnataka to extend the runway planned at the naval base at Karwar to 2,500 metres (8,200 ft) to accommodate Airbus A320s and to acquire 75 extra hectares for this purpose. In 2011, the Navy affirmed that Hansa would retain its assets and position as an important station for the Indian Navy, despite the commissioning of INS Kadamba.

== Air cargo ==
An estimated 5,000 tonnes (5,500 short tons) of cargo were handled annually as of a few years ago and may have declined since then. Most air cargo is carried in the belly-space of airlines such as Air India rather than in dedicated freighters. As of 2016, all domestic cargo is handled at Dabolim airport. GoAir, Vistara, and other airlines use AAI's facilities, including machines, to process cargo during non-peak hours. AAI has plans to build and operate a 24x7 cargo terminal at Dabolim in the old international terminal. Once completed, the common user terminal for cargo would be able to cater to both domestic and international cargo flights on a continuous basis.

== Ground transportation ==
Passengers can reach the airport using taxis, buses, trains, or automobiles. Public buses go to the nearby city of Vasco da Gama, approximately 4 km (2.5 mi) away, and also stop at the closer Chicalim bus stop, about 1.5 km (0.93 mi) from the airport. Local mini-buses connect both Vasco da Gama and Chicalim to the airport. Pre-paid taxis are available from the airport. There are various new transportation plans in the works, including the addition of a second bridge. Meanwhile, plans for a 6-lane, north-to-south expressway are on hold in Goa. A monorail system is also being considered. All these plans have implications for the proposed Mopa Airport and its link to Dabolim and Goa's population centres.

The nearest station is Dabolim railway station. The port at Mormugao is located about 5 km (3.1 mi) away. Konkan Railway provides services to Margao in South Goa, Tivim in North Goa, Carambolim, and Ponda.

== Accidents and incidents ==
- On 1 October 2002, two Indian Navy Ilyushin Il-38s collided and crashed near Dabolim Airport, killing 12 naval personnel in the planes and three civilians on the ground. Both aircraft were part of an air show to celebrate the 25th anniversary of the naval Air Squadron 315.
- On 15 October 2012, two pilots and a technical sailor on board a HAL Chetak helicopter of the Indian Navy were killed after the helicopter crashed whilst landing towards the eastern side of the runway.
- On 27 December 2016, Jet Airways flight 9W 2374, a Boeing 737-800, took a 360-degree spin as it veered of the runway damaging the landing gear. Of the seven crew members and 154 passengers, 15 passengers suffered minor injuries.
- On 3 January 2018, a MIG-29K fighter aircraft of the Navy with a trainee pilot crashed off the runway during takeoff at Dabolim Airport. There were no casualties.
- On 17 December 2019, a SpiceJet Flight SG 3568, a De Havilland Canada Dash 8, was on final approach for landing when the runway controller noticed that the nose landing gear was not deployed. He immediately alerted the ATC tower and informed the aircraft to abort the landing and make a second attempt after a go around. The second attempt proved unsuccessful. In the third attempt the landing gear was partially deployed and the aircraft safely landed at Dabolim Airport. There were no casualties.

== See also ==
- Airports in India
- List of busiest airports in India by passenger traffic
