= Diu Airport =

Airport in Diu, India

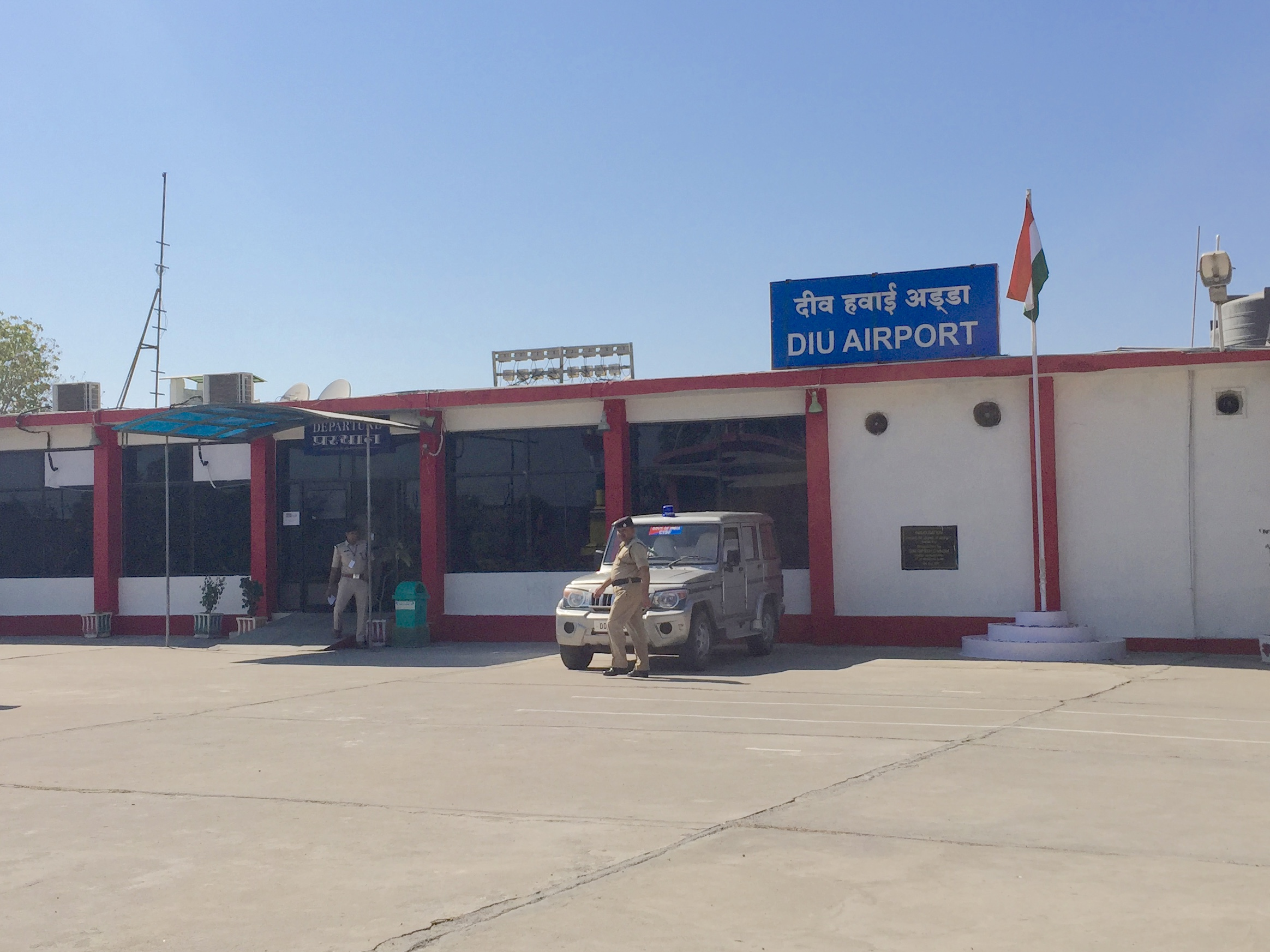
- IATA: DIU; ICAO: VADU

Summary
- Airport type: Public
- Operator: Airports Authority of India
- Serves: Diu
- Location: Diu, Dadra and Nagar Haveli and Daman and Diu, India
- Opened: 1954; 72 years ago
- Elevation AMSL: 31 ft (9.4 m)
- Coordinates: 20.713°N 70.925°E

Map
- Location within Gujarat Location within India

Runways
Direction	Length		Surface
Direction	m	ft	Surface
05/23	1,826	5,922	Asphalt

Statistics (April 2025 – March 2026)
- Passengers: 1,27,659 (▲22.5%)
- Aircraft movements: 3,250 (▲26%)
- Cargo tonnage: 0 ( o%)
- Source: AAI

Diu Airport (IATA: DIU, ICAO: VADU) is a domestic airport serving Diu in the union territory of Dadra and Nagar Haveli and Daman and Diu, India. Besides Diu, it also serves the neighbouring areas of Gujarat, including Veraval and Jafrabad. It is the only airport in the union territory with commercial operations.

== History ==
Diu Airport was built in 1954, when Diu was part of Portuguese India. Transportes Aéreos da Índia Portuguesa (TAIP) commenced operations to Diu on 16 August 1955. The airline linked Diu with Goa, Daman and Karachi until December 1961, when the Indian air force bombed the airfield.

== Structure ==
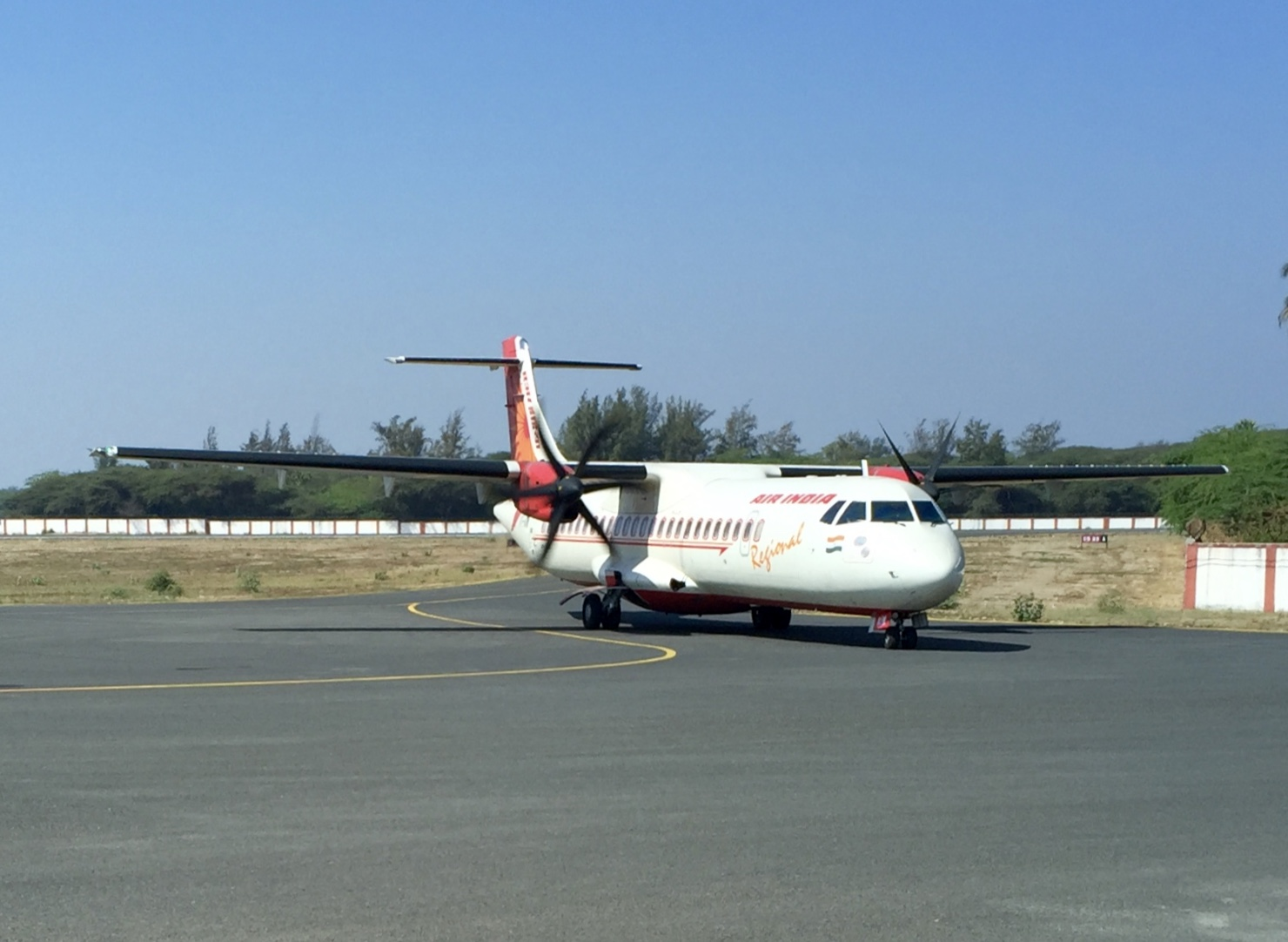
Apron area of the airport

Diu Airport's main runway 05/23 is 5922 ft (1826 m) long and 45 m wide, connected to an apron measuring 60 by 90 metres via two taxiways. The airport terminal can accommodate 100 passengers each in the arrivals and departure halls. A non-directional beacon (NDB) is Diu's sole navigational aid.

== Airlines and destinations ==
Airlines	Destinations
Alliance Air	Mumbai, Keshod
IndiGo	Ahmedabad, Mumbai–Navi,Surat
Star Air	Ahmedabad, Goa-Mopa

== See also ==
- List of airports in Gujarat
- List of airports in India
