= Daman Airport =

Airport in Daman, India

- IATA: NMB; ICAO: VADN

Summary
- Airport type: Military/Public
- Operator: Indian Coast Guard
- Serves: Daman, India
- Location: Nani Daman, Daman, India
- Elevation AMSL: 10 m (33 ft)
- Coordinates: 20°26′04″N 072°50′36″E

Map
- Location within Gujarat Location within India

Runways
Direction	Length		Surface
Direction	m	ft	Surface
03/21	1,801	5,909	Asphalt
10/28	1,000	3,282	Asphalt

Daman Airport (IATA: NMB, ICAO: VADN) is a military airbase at Daman in the union territory of Dadra and Nagar Haveli and Daman and Diu. It is home to the Indian Coast Guard Air Station, Daman which provides ATC and parking facilities to Defence as well as civilian aircraft.

== History ==
Daman Airport was built in the 1950s by the Government of Portuguese India. The TAIP (Portuguese India Airlines) commenced operations to Daman on 29 August 1955. TAIP linked Daman with Goa, Diu and Karachi until December 1961, when Daman was taken by the Indian Armed Forces, with TAIP ceasing operations.

The Indian Coast Guard deployed its first Dornier Squadron at Daman in January 1987 followed by its first full-fledged Air Station in October 1987.

On 5 June 2026, Prime Minister Narendra Modi inaugurated the new terminal building of NAMO Airport in Daman. The terminal building was developed to enhance regional air connectivity and support tourism and economic development in the Union Territory of Dadra and Nagar Haveli and Daman and Diu.

== Structure ==
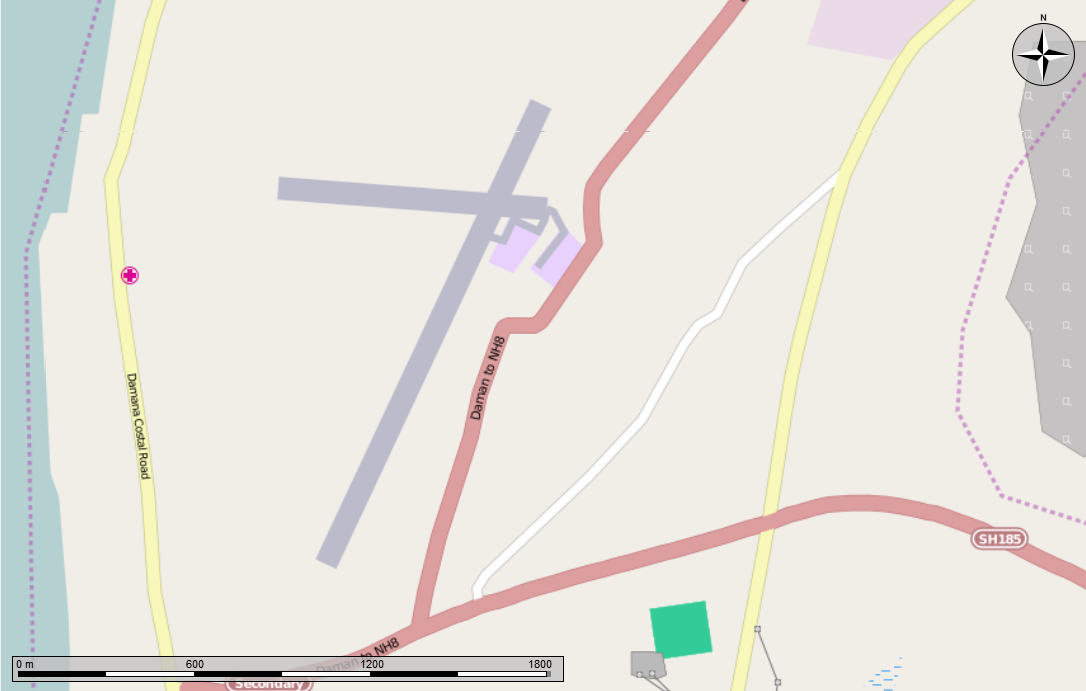
Map of the airport

Daman Airport has two intersecting asphalt runways.

The main runway 03/21 is 5910 ft (1801 m) long and 45 m wide while the secondary runway 10/28 is 3284 ft (1001 m) long and 25 m wide. The airport is equipped with Airport Surveillance Radar (ASR), Precision Approach Path Indicator (PAPI), Doppler Very High Frequency Omnidirectional Radio Range (DVOR) – Distance Measuring Equipment (DME) and Non-Directional Beacon (NDB), as navigation aids.

== Airlines and destinations ==
Airlines	Destinations
Alliance Air	Ahmedabad, Delhi, Mumbai

== Indian Coast Guard Air Station ==
The station has two squadrons under its administrative and operational control.

- 750 SQN (ICG) operating Dornier 228 aircraft
- 841 SQN (ICG) operating Chetak helicopters

The station also caters for maritime reconnaissance and SAR coverage along the north west coast. Dornier and Chetak aircraft are detached from Daman for operational commitments along the coast. Conduct of adventurous activities is a regular feature. For that the station is equipped with one micro light aircraft and one power glider. The training for Sea Cadet Corps are undertaken at the air station.
