= Transportes Aéreos da Índia Portuguesa =

Portuguese Indian airline (1955–1961)

Transportes Aéreos da Índia Portuguesa (Air Transport of Portuguese India) or TAIP was an airline which operated from Portuguese India from 1955 (71 years ago) to 1961 (65 years ago). During this period, it functioned as the state airline of Portuguese India, which comprised Goa, Damão and Diu.

TAIP was created in 1955 as a public company linked to the General Government of Portuguese India, initially named STAIP - Serviços de Transportes Aéreos da Índia Portuguesa (Air Transport Services of Portuguese India). The airline was commonly referred to by the acronym TAIP.

The main objective of the creation of TAIP was to counteract the blockade that India had imposed upon Portugal's territories next to India, as part of Jawaharlal Nehru's efforts to annex them. The creation of TAIP was accompanied by the development of airport facilities of Goa, Damão and Diu to allow the operation of large aircraft, allowing air links with these territories without any use of Indian infrastructure.(MONTEIRO, 2008).

== Establishment of TAIP ==
After the refusal of the Portuguese Government to hand over Goa, Daman and Diu to India, Indian Prime Minister Nehru adopted a policy of blocking the services and infrastructure vital to the economy of these regions in the hope of inducing a revolt by the Goans. In effect, foreign trade, air routes, rail links, telephone lines and bank accounts were cut off, and the movement of people and goods between Goa, Daman and Diu and the territories controlled by the Indian union was banned. The Portuguese Governor-General Paulo Bénard Guedes was concerned about the urgent need to find alternative means for moving people, goods and capital to ensure economic activities.

In July 1951, the Director General of the Portuguese Overseas Administration Ministry proposed to the Director General of Civil Aviation to send a Technical Mission for Aerodromes to:

a) study and detail a construction project to build an international airport in Goa;

b) study improvements to be made immediately to allow the use of the existing airstrips at Dabolim, Mormugao, Daman and Diu to land light twin-engined aeroplanes; and

c) study the viability of establishing air connections with the three segments of Estado da India Portuguesa.

On 25 June 1953, the Commander of the Military Air Transport Squadron undertook a feasibility study to airlift supplies to Goa. As the current airfields in Goa, Daman and Diu were not capable of receiving the heavy DC-4 "Skymaster" transporters, the government considered the creation of air transport services as a civilian company integrated within the government services of the Estado da Índia Portuguesa to organise and develop proper airports.

The decision to construct airport infrastructure came as a result of preliminary studies which indicated that this would be the most viable option (according to the optimisation criteria). Eventually, three airports were opened in May 1955 and subsequently support facilities (hangars, workshops, terminals, runways, etc.). Consequently, an air transport company initially named STAIP - Serviços de Transportes Aéreos da Índia Portuguesa (Air Transport Services of Portuguese India) was created, . After some time, it was shortened to Transportes Aereos da Índia Portuguesa, best known as TAIP.

The airports in the smaller enclaves of Daman and Diu had to be strategically oriented so as to respect Indian airspace and avoid any confrontations with the Indian authorities on take-off and landing. In 1957, the Indian government placed anti-aircraft guns just outside the air corridors and threatened to shoot down any planes violating the Indian airspace. The manoeuvres had to be precise and the pilots had to adhere to very strict routes. The margins of tolerance could not be exceeded by a mile. Such were the risks that the civilian aircraft had to face with respect to Daman and Diu.

On 29 May 1955, the first air mechanics left for Goa, flying first by plane to Karachi, thence by ship to Mormugao landing on 16 June 1955, to prepare and set up a basic maintenance environment at Dabolim. In the meanwhile, four pilots went to Hatfield, in England, to acquaint themselves with the newly purchased Heron aircraft.

The first aircraft acquired by TAIP arrived in Goa flown by Maj. Solano de Almeida with a crew consisting of Capt. Palma Rego, Sgt. Simões Cardoso and 2nd Sgt. Desterro de Brito on 10 August 1955. It was a small four-engine de Havilland Heron manufactured in England and had capacity to transport 14 passengers and some cargo.

TAIP commenced operations by connecting Goa, Daman, Diu and Karachi. From 1960, a regular link was established between Goa and Mozambique, serving Beira and Maputo. Eventually, links were also established to Japan, Saudi Arabia and Timor. At the beginning of the Portuguese Colonial War in Angola in 1961, TAIP supported the transport of troops and material between Lisbon and Luanda. There were plans to expand the TAIP's network to East Africa, the Middle East, East Timor and even Lisbon, but these would never come to fruition.

== Rapid growth ==
TAIP began operations with a de Havilland Heron aeroplane, but with the rapid increase of frequency of flights and the number of passengers carried, quickly expanded its fleet to larger aircraft. In 1961, TAIP had a fleet of seven modern aircraft (two Vickers VC.1 Vikings, two DC-4's and three DC-6's). In the last two years of its operation, TAIP recorded increases (annual) passengers carried in the order of 32% and 66%, totalling 7,258 passengers in 1959 and 5,849 passengers in 1959 to 10 August 1960, respectively.

== Demise of TAIP ==
Just before the Annexation of Goa, TAIP was used for the evacuation of civilians from Goa to Karachi. On the day of the invasion (18 December 1961) only one of TAIP's DC-4's was at Dabolim Airport and it escaped the bombing of that installation, along with a plane of TAP Portugal. That night, the track was repaired, allowing two planes to take off for Karachi from where they went to Lisbon. With that, TAIP's operations came to an end.(MONTEIRO, 2008).

== Aircraft operated ==
- de Havilland Heron (2)
- Vickers VC.1 Viking (2)
- Douglas DC-4 (2)
- Douglas DC-6 (3)

== See also ==
- Portuguese India
