= Paulo Bénard Guedes =

Portuguese politician and general

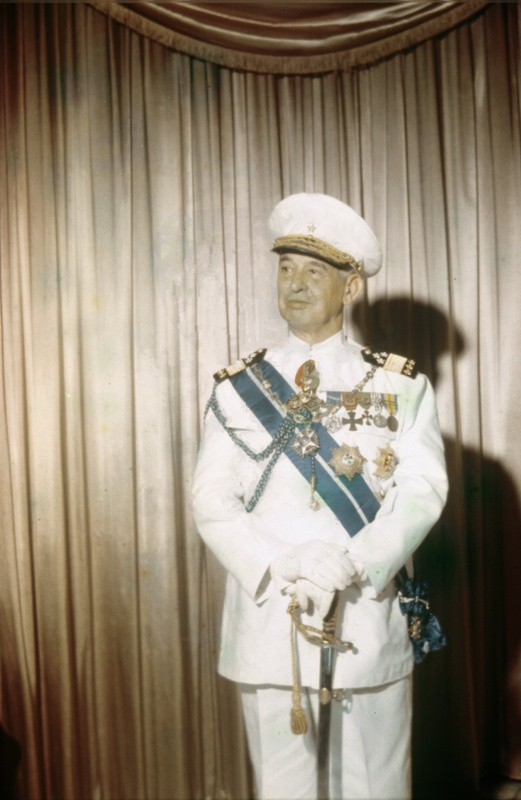
General Bénard Guedes in 1957

Paulo Bénard Guedes (Lisbon, 5 October 1892 – Benguela, 11 September 1960) was the 127th Governor-General of Portuguese India. He was also a general of the Portuguese army.

== Biography ==
Paulo Bénard Guedes was born in Lisbon in 1892. He began his military career early, having specialized in the Infantry branch in 1913. He also underwent a course of the Colonial School (now the Instituto Superior de Ciências Sociais e Políticas of the Universidade Técnica de Lisboa).

He served in Portuguese Mozambique during World War I, and entered the Republican National Guard on his return to Portugal. He was also successful at the Directorate of Diplomatic Services.

During World War II, Bénard Guedes assumed the role of Interim Governor of Portuguese India. In the early 1950s, after a series of military commanders, between 1952 and 1958, he was appointed to the post of the Governor-General of Portuguese India. He was the lieutenant to Duarte Nuno.

Paulo Bénard Guedes died in Portuguese Angola, in Benguela city, in 1960.

General Paulo Bénard Guedes, was awarded Officer of the Order of the Tower and Sword, Grand-Officer of the Order of the Colonial Empire and of the Order of Aviz; comenda of the Order of St. Gregory the Great, of the Order of Aviz, of the Holy See, and of the Order of Civil Merit of Spain, the Fourragère medal of gold of Military Valor, and the medals of the expedition to Mozambique, the Victory (with star Silver) and the Silver Medal of Exemplary Behaviour.

== Decorations ==
- Medalha da Rainha Dona Amélia da Expedição a Moçambique de Portugal (? de ? de 1???)
- Military Valor Medal (Gold) (MOVM) (Note: Portuguese: Medalha de Valor Militar – Grau Ouro – At the center of the ribbon, a national shield is placed, resting on a golden armillary sphere. Recipient is entitled to wear a Fourragère) (Portugal) which entitled him to wear the Fourragère (? de ? de 19??)
- Medalha da Vitória com Estrela de Prata de Portugal (? de ? de 19??)
- Oficial da Ordem Militar da Torre e Espada, do Valor, Lealdade e Mérito de Portugal (6 de Fevereiro de 1922)
- Medalha de Prata de Comportamento Exemplar de Portugal (? de ? de 19??)
- Comendador da Ordem Militar de Avis de Portugal (19 de Setembro de 1941)
- Grande-Oficial Ordem Militar de Avis de Portugal (2 de Março de 1949)
- (Vatican City) Comendador da Ordem de São Gregório Magno do Vaticano ou da Santa Sé (20 de Novembro de 1953)
- (Spain) Grã-Cruz da Ordem do Mérito Civil de Espanha (5 de Maio de 1954); recebeu, ainda, a
- Grande-Oficial da Ordem do Império de Portugal (25 de Maio de 1957)

== See also ==
- List of governors of Portuguese India
