= Evolution of the Portuguese Empire =

Overview of the possessions of the Portuguese Empire

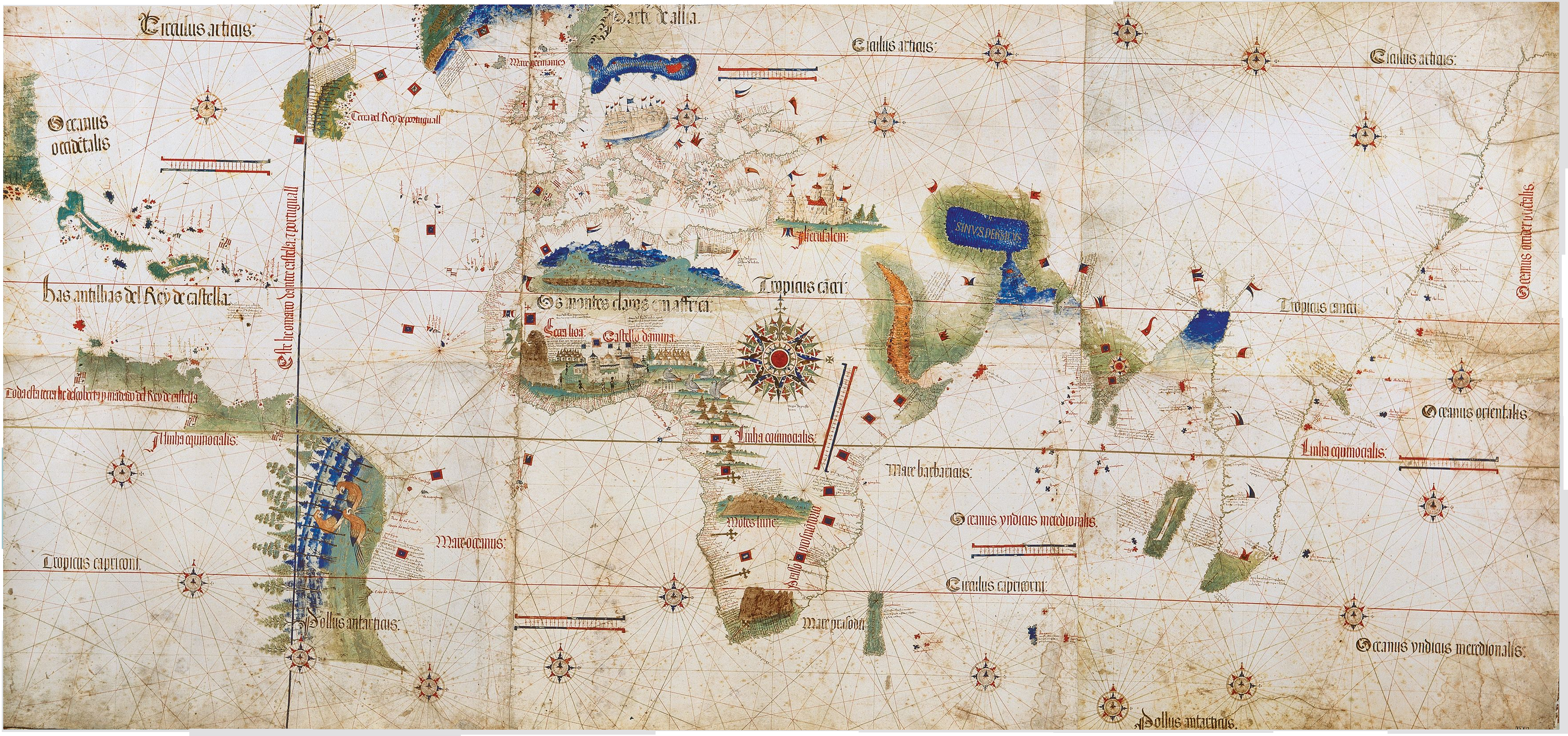
Cantino planisphere, 1502

This article is a comprehensive list of all former possessions of Portugal.

== Europe ==
Portuguese founded factories in various places in Europe, with a purely commerce-focused strategy, different from the other continents.

- Antwerp (Belgium) – factory
- Bruges (Belgium) – factory
- Venice (Italy) – factory (c. 1508)
- Chios (Greece) – factory (founded in 1499)

== Africa ==
Portuguese presence in Africa started in 1415 with the conquest of Ceuta and is generally viewed as ending in 1975, with the exception of the Madeira autonomous region, still under Portuguese sovereignty, located in the African Plate.

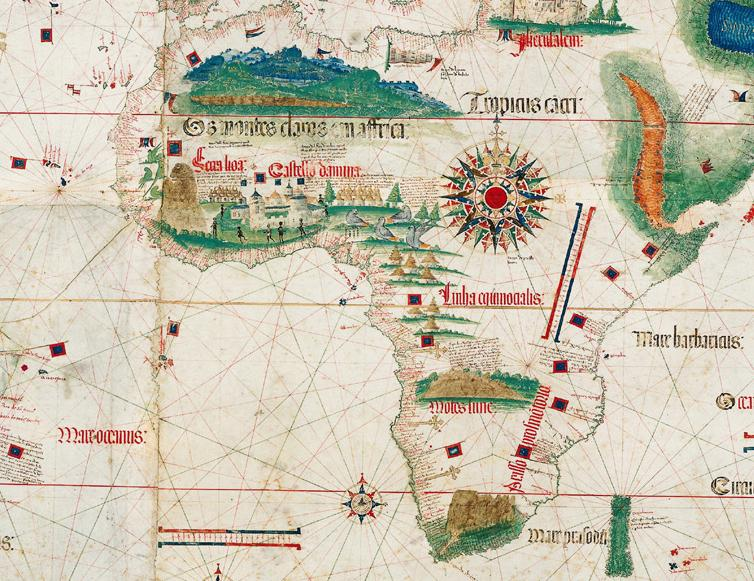
From Cantino planisphere of 1502

- Settlements in North Africa:
  - Oran (Algeria) - factory.
  - Ceuta (Spain) - colony - 1415–1640.
  - Alcácer Ceguer/El Qsar es Seghir (Morocco) - colony - 1458–1550.
  - Tangier (Morocco) - colony - 1471–1662.
  - Arzila/Asilah (Morocco) - colony - 1471–1550; 1577–1589.
  - Larache (Morocco) - factory.
  - Graciosa Fortress (Morocco).
  - São João da Mamora/Mehdya (Morocco) - fortress - 1515.
  - Fez (Morocco) - factory.
  - Azamor/Azemmour (Morocco) - colony - 1513–1541.
  - Mazagan/El Jadida (Morocco) - possession - 1506–1769.
  - Oualidia (Morocco) - fortress.
  - Borj Nador (Morocco) - fortress.
  - Safim/Safi (Morocco) - 1488–1541.
  - Aguz/Souira Guedima (Morocco) - 1506–1525.
  - Mogador/Essaouira (Morocco) - 1506–1510.
  - Bom Mirão (Morocco) - fortress.
  - Santa Cruz do Cabo de Gué/Agadir (Morocco) - 1505–1541.
  - Massa (Morocco) - factory.
- Lanzarote (Spain) - colony.
- Gando (Gran Canaria, Spain) - fortress.
- Arguin/Arguim (Mauritania) - 1455–1633.
- Ouadane (Mauritania) - factory -1487.
- Cabo Verde/Cape Verde: settlements (1462–1495); dominion of crown colonies (1495–1587); crown colony (1587–1951); overseas province (1951–1974); autonomous republic (1974–1975). Independence in 1975.
- Senegal River Mouth (Senegal) - Fort (1488).
- Gorée (1444–1588) (Senegal) - Trading post. Briefly reconquered in 1629.
- Ziguinchor (Senegal) - possession (1645–1888). Ceded to France in 1888.
- Guiné Portuguesa/Portuguese Guinea: colony (1879–1951); overseas province (1951–1974). Unilateral independence declared in 1973, recognized by Portugal in 1974.
  - Cacheu: captaincy (1640–1879). United with Bissau in 1879.
  - Bissau: settlement under Cacheu (1687–1696); captaincy (1696–1707); abandoned (1707–1753); separate colony under Cape Verde (1753–1879). United with Cacheu in 1879.
- Rokupr (Sierra Leone) - possession (it was under the Portuguese c. 1778)
- Tumbu Island (Sierra Leone) - fort.
- Portuguese Gold Coast
  - Fort Duma (Ghana) - 1623 - 1636 (?).
  - Post in the Ankobra River Mouth (Left Bank) (Ghana).
  - Fort Saint Anthony of Axim (Ghana) - 1515–1642.
  - Post in Abokwa Island (Ghana) - 1580s/1590s.
  - Post in Adwoa (Ghana) - 1620s.
  - Saint Sebastian Fort in Shama (Ghana).
  - Elmina (Ghana): colony (1482–1637), capital of the Portuguese Gold Coast.
  - Factory in Biriwa (Ghana) - 1680-1683.
  - Fort Saint Vincent in Accra (Ghana) - 1557–1578.
  - Osu Castle (Ghana) - 1680-1682.
- Fort of São João Baptista de Ajudá (1680–1961) (Benin): Constructed on a land grant from the King of Dahomey. Portuguese evicted by the independent Republic of Dahomey.
- Savi (Benin): Factory.
- Godomey (Benin): Fort - founded in 1730.
- Ughoton (Nigeria): Factory - 1485/1486 - 1507/1520s.
- Riaba (Bioko, Equatorial Guinea) - Settlement - 1507.
- São Tomé and Príncipe/São Tomé e Príncipe: crown colony (1753–1951); overseas province (1951–1971); local administration (1971–1975). Independence in 1975.
  - São Tomé: possession (1470–1485); colony (1485–1522); crown colony (1522–1641); administration under Dutch occupation (1641–1648). French occupation in 1648.
  - Príncipe: colony (1471–1753). United with São Tomé in 1753.
- Annobón Island (Equatorial Guinea) - colony.
- Corisco Island (Equatorial Guinea) - fort.
- Coniquet Island (Gabon) - fort.
- Cape Lopez (Gabon) - fort.
- Loango (1500–1867) (Congo) - Slave port.
- Saint Helena Island (UK) - possession.
- Angola/Portuguese West Africa: colony (1575–1589); crown colony (1589–1951); overseas province (1951–1971); state (1971–1975). Independence in 1975.
- Fort Mocusso (1909–1912) (Namibia) - Military fort constructed in German South-West Africa. Abandoned, relocated to Angola in 1912.
- Matatana (Madagascar) - factory.
- Moçambique/Portuguese East Africa: possession (1498–1501); subordinate to Goa (1501–1569); captaincy-general (1569–1609); colony subordinate to Goa (1609–1752); colony (1752–1951); overseas province (1951–1971); state (1971–1974); local transitional administration (1974–1975). Independence in 1975.
- Nova Feira do Aruângua do Norte (Zambia) - colony.
- Luangwa/ Feira (Zambia) - colony.
- Prazo Inhaçoé (around Lusitu, Zambia) - 1886-1890.
- Maramuca (Zimbabwe) - settlement.
- Chitomborwizi (Zimbabwe) - settlement.
- Angwa (Zimbabwe) - settlement.
- Dambarare (Zimbabwe) - settlement.
- Massapa (Zimbabwe) - settlement.
- Luanze (Zimbabwe) - settlement.
- Chiromo (Malawi) - occupation.
- Mbewe - occupation.
- Katunga (near Blantyre, Malawi) - occupation.
- Quíloa (Tanzania) - 1505–1512.
- Mafia Island (Tanzania) - fort.
- Zanzibar (Tanzania) - factory.
- Mombaça/Mombasa (Kenya) - occupation (1593–1638); colony subordinate to Goa (1638–1698; 1728–1729). Under Omani sovereignty in 1729.
- Malindi (Kenya) - occupation (1500–1630)
- Pate (Kenya) - fort.
- Tukutu (Kenya) - colony.

== Asia-Pacific ==
India was reached by the Portuguese in 1498 by Vasco da Gama. Macau was the last possession in Asia and was handed over to the People's Republic of China in 1999.

=== Middle East ===
- Aden: Attempted conquest by Albuquerque (1513) and Albergaria (1516). Occupied for a few months in 1547–1548 before being recaptured by Piri Reis
- Bahrain: possession (1521–1602). Driven out by a native revolt and occupied by Persian troops.
- Bandar-e-Kong/Bandar Congo: free factory and port, by treaty with Persia (1629-1725)
- Basra (1550–1668): Portuguese vassal (1550–1595). Occupation (1595–1624). Integral part of the Portuguese Empire (1624–1668). Lost to the Ottomans.
- Bushehr (1506–1622): Lost to the Safavids.
- Comorão/Bandar Abbas: possession (1506–1615). Conquered by Persian forces.
- Chabahar (1508–1621): Lost to the British.
- Failaka Island/Ilha de Aguada: Possible portuguese settlements
- Isfahan (1602–1748): Augustinian convent founded in 1602; acted as an informal embassy
- Portuguese Oman (1507–1656): String of forts, port cities, and trading posts along the southeastern coast of the Arabian Peninsula.
  - Borca/Barka: Trading post.
  - Calaiate/Calha/Qalhat: Quickly abandoned in favor of Muscat.
  - Cassapo/Khasab: Coastal fort.
  - Corfacão/Khor Fakkan (1513–1666): Major economic center.
  - Curiate/Qurayyat: Coastal fort.
  - Doba/Dibba (1623–1650): Taken on behalf of Hormuz. Lost to the Omanis.
  - Ghallah/Quelba/Kalba: Coastal fort.
  - Julfar: Trading post.
  - Libidia/Al Badiyah: Coastal fort. Abandoned in 1600.
  - Lima/Limah: Possession.
  - Madá/Madha: Fortified post.
  - Matara/Muttrah: Coastal fort.
  - Muscat (1507–1650): Driven out by native inhabitants.
  - Mocombira/Mocombi: Possession.
  - Sibo/Seeb: Coastal fort.
  - Soar/Sohar: Coastal fort.
- Qatar: possession (1517–1538). Lost to the Ottomans.
- Queixome/Qeshm Island (1515–1622).
- Hormuz/Ormus: possession subordinate to Goa (1515–1622). Captured by a joint force between the Safavid Empire and the English East India Company.
- Socotra: possession (1506–1511). Became part of Mahri Sultanate of Qishn and Suqutra

=== Indian Subcontinent ===
- Ceylon: colony (1597–1658). Dutch took control in 1656, Jaffna taken in 1658.
- Maldives: possession (1518–1521, 1558–1573)

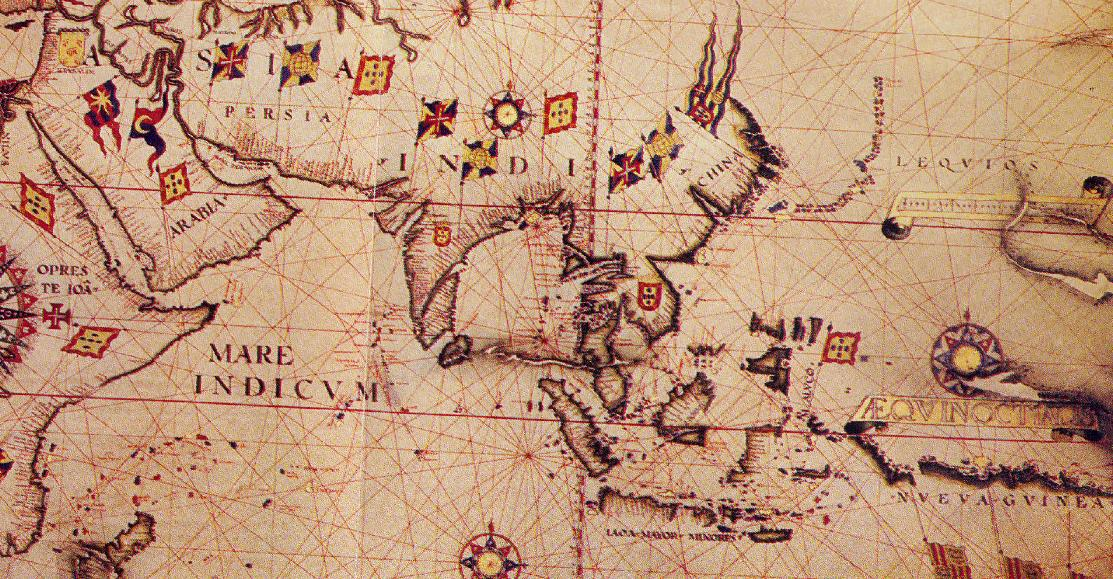
From an anonymous atlas c.1550

- Índia Portuguesa/Portuguese India: overseas province (1946–1962). Taken over by India in 1962 and recognised by Portugal in 1974.

==== Colonies ====
- Baçaim/Vasai: possession (1535–1739)
- Bankot Fort (1548–1699): given to the British.
- Basrur (15??–1665): Sacked by the Marathas.
- Batticala/Bhatkal (1502–1606): Driven out by native inhabitants.
- Bombaím/Mumbai: possession (1534–1661)
- Calicut/Kozhikode: settlement (1512–1525)
- Cannanore/Kolathunadu: possession (1502–1663)
- Chaul: possession (1521–1740)
- Cochin/Kochi: possession (1500–1663)
- Comorin (15??–1656): Lost to the Dutch.
- Cranganore/Kodungallur: possession (1536–1662)
- Damão/Daman: acquisition in 1559. Became part of overseas province in 1946. Taken over by India in Dec 1961.
- Diu: acquisition in 1535. Became part of overseas province in 1946. Taken over by India in Dec 1961.
  - Ghoghla/Gogolá (1538–1961): coastal village. Seized by India in 1961. Officially ceded along with Diu in 1975.
  - Simbor (1722–1961): Fort of São António de Simbor constructed in 1722 to suppress piracy. Seized by India in 1961. officially ceded in 1975.
- Dadra: acquisition in 1779. Taken over by India in 1954.
- Goa: colony (1510–1946). Became part of overseas province in 1946. Taken over by India in Dec 1961.
  - Angediva Island (1505–1961): Intermittenly occupied. Island abandoned in 1961.
- Honnavar (16th century–18th century): Coastal fort. Driven out by the English who established a factory there.
- Coulão/Kollam: possession (1502–1661)
- Korlai Fort (1594–1739): Taken from the Ahmadnagar Sultanate. Lost to the Marathas.
- Laccadive Islands/Lakshadweep (1498–1545). Driven out by its native inhabitants.
- Mangalore (1568–1659)
- São Tomé de Meliapore/Mylapore: settlement (1523–1662; 1687–1749)
- Nagar Haveli: acquisition in 1779. Taken over by India in 1954.
- Negapatam/Nagapattinam (1507–1657)
- Porto Novo/Parangipettai: Possession.
- Paliacate/Pulicat (1502–1610). Occupied by the Dutch in 1610.
- Salsette Island: possession (1534–1737). Conquered by the Marathas.
- Sandwip (1602–1621): Trade hub possessed as part of a power-sharing agreement with Arakan and Bengal Subah. Conquered by Mrauk U.
- Tuticorin/Thoothukudi (1548–1658)

==== Trading posts ====
- Agra: the Mughal Emperor Akbar gave permission to the Jesuit Order build a church in the city
- Cambay/Khambhat: factory (?–1616)
- Xatigan/Chittagong: possession (1528–1666)
- Cuddalore: Lost to the French and the English.
- Dacca (1580–1765): Settlement and church. Taken by the British in 1765.
- Hughli/Hugli: possession (1579–1632)
- Lahari Bandar (16th century–18th century): Major trading post. Abandoned in the 18th century.
- Lahore: the Portuguese got permission to build a church there. Later turned into a protestant church.
- Masulipatnam/Machilipatnam (1598–1610)
- Punicale (1551–16??): Pearl fishery.
- Surat: settlement (1540–1612)
- Thatta: Factory

=== East Asia ===
- Chinese concessions: Territories gained through the Unequal Treaties of the 19th and 20th century.
  - Beihai: (1876–1949). Privileges discontinued by the Chinese Communist Party.
  - Shanghai International Settlement: (1863–1945). Administered jointly with other trading powers in China. Settlement abolished in 1945.
  - Macau/Macao: Unofficial Settlement (1553–1557). Leased territory subordinated to Goa (1557–1844). Overseas province (1844–1883). Combined overseas province with Portuguese Timor under Goa (1883–1951). Overseas province (1951–1976). Autonomous region (1976–1999). Returned to full sovereignty of the People's Republic of China as a special administrative region in 1999.
    - Coloane: Occupied in 1864.
    - Taipa: Occupied in 1851.
    - Ilha Verde: Incorporated in 1890.
    - Ilhas de Lapa, Dom João, e Montanha: Lapa occupied in 1654. Dom João occupied in 1849. Ilha de Montanha occupied in 1938. Lost to Japan in 1941.
- Japanese Voyages (1550–1639): Portuguese arrive and begin to settle in 1543. Officially established by the government in Goa in 1550. Ended in 1639 by decree of the Tokugawa Shogunate.
  - Deshima (1570–1639): Constructed by the Portuguese. Forced out by the Shōgun and granted to the Dutch in 1641.
  - Fukuda (1565–1571): Portuguese invited into the port in 1565. Abandoned in 1571 due to bad weather conditions.
  - Funai/Ōita (1543-1600?): Port of call.
  - Hirado (1543–1571): Abandoned in favor of Nagasaki.
  - Kagoshima (1543–1639): center of Jesuit activity. Anti-Christian bans forced out the Jesuits in 1639.
  - Nagasáqui/Nagasaki (1543–1639): Unofficial settlement (1543–1570). Leased territory (1570–1580). Administrative control (1580–1587). Trading post and settlement (1587–1639). Portuguese forced out as a part of the Shōgun's policy of Sakoku.
  - Vocoxiura/Yokoseura (1562–1571): Initial base for Jesuit activities in Japan. Abandoned in favor of Nagasaki.
- Liampó/Ningbo (1522–1548): Heavy Portuguese presence in the city itself and settlement in nearby Shuangyu. Settlement destroyed by Ming authorities in 1548 as a part of an anti-piracy campaign.
- São João Island/Shangchuan Island: possession (15??–1557). Abandoned in favor of Macao.
- Tamão: (1513–1521) Trade settlement. Driven out by the Ming Navy.
- Yuegang: (1533–???) Popular trading and smuggling port for Portuguese merchants. Unknown when Portuguese merchants ceased trading. Port closed in 1727.

=== Southeast Asia ===
- Ayutthaya: portuguese settlement (1516-1767)
- Bassein/Pathein/Cosmim (1516): Expelled by the Burmese
- Cambodia (1593-1597): Joint Spanish-Portuguese invasion against the Siamese occupation of cambodia; ultimately failed.
- Portuguese East Indies (1511–1975/2002). Colonial dependency of Goa (1522–1844); Subordinated to Macao (1844–1850); Independent colony (1850–1851); Subordinated to Macao (1851–1856); Subordinated to Goa (1856–1863); Overseas province (1863–1866); Subordinate to Macao (1866–1896); Independent colony (1896–1950); Overseas province (1950–1975); Unilateral Independence and Indonesian Occupation (1975–1999); UN Administration (1999–2002).
- Calapa (1522–1619): Port granted to the Portuguese by the Hindu Sunda Kingdom in return for military support against their Muslim neighbors. Lost to the Dutch.
- Malacca: colony (1511–1641).
- Muar Fortress (1604–1641).
- Forts in Maluku Islands:
  - Fort in Galala (Ambon).
  - Fort in Batu Merah (Ambon).
  - Fort Victoria (Ambon): fort - 1576–1605.
  - Fort in Ullath (Saparua): ? - 1565.
  - Fort Kastela (Ternate): fort and village - 1522-1575.
  - Reis Magos Fort (Tidore): fort - 1578–1605.
  - Fort in Jailolo (Halmahera): ? - 1570.
  - Fort in Mamuya (Halmahera): ? - 1570.
  - Fort in Tafasoho (Makian): 1602-1603.
- Makassar (1544–1665); portuguese settlement and important commercial center; lost to the Dutch.
- Pacem (1521–1524): Occupied, then quickly abandoned.
- Timor: claimed and partially possessed from 1520 to 1640.
- Cupão/Kupang: Trading post. Taken by the Dutch in 1613
- Flores Island: possession (16th–19th century). Sold the island to the Dutch East Indies
- Solor: possession (1520–1636).
- Fort Solor/Forte de Nossa Senhora da Piedade de Solor (1566-1613)
- Portuguese Timor: colony subordinate to Portuguese India (1642–1844); subordinate to Macau (1844–1896); separate colony (1896–1951); overseas territory (1951–1975); republic and unilateral independence proclaimed, annexed by Indonesia (1975–1999, UN recognition as Portuguese territory). UN administration from 1999 until independence in 2002.
- Ilha de Ataúro (1859–1975): Granted to the Portuguese by the Dutch in 1859.
- Martaban: Factory (1521–?)
- Pattani: factory (1516-1640)
- Syriam/Thanlyin: possession (1599–1613). Ruled by Filipe de Brito e Nicote.

== South America ==
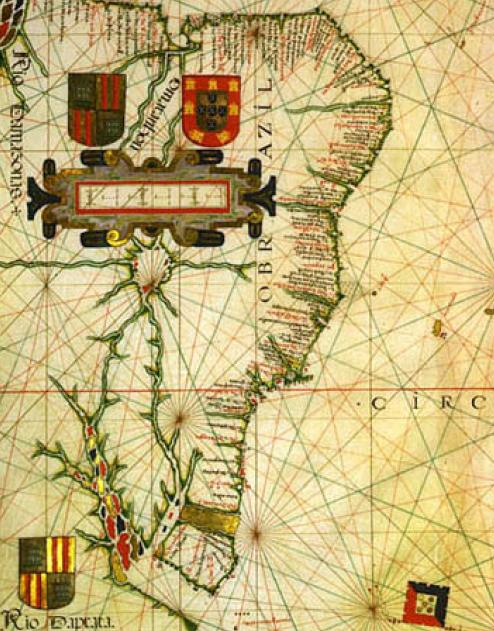
From Vaz Dourado atlas of c. 1576

Brazil was explored and claimed in 1500, and become independent in 1822. Unlike the Spanish, the Portuguese did not divide their possession in South America in several vice-royalties.

- Brazil: possession known as Ilha de Vera Cruz, later Terra de Santa Cruz (1500–1530); colony (1530–1714); vice-kingdom (1714–1815); kingdom united with the Kingdom of Portugal (1815–1822), independence in 1822.
- French Guiana - occupation - 1809 - 1817.
- Tabocas (Colombia) - village between the Cahuinari and Miritiparaná rivers, founded in 1781.
- La Cruz (Bolivia) - settlement.
- Puerto Villazon (Bolivia) - settlement (named Guarajus by Portugal).
- Fuerte Olimpo (Paraguay) - occupation - 1812.
- Uruguay: settlement, such as Nova Colónia do Sacramento and Montevideo. Invasion in 1811-1812. Invasion in 1816. Captaincy in 1817 (of the United Kingdom of Portugal, Brazil and the Algarves). Adhered as a province of the new Empire of Brazil in 1822. Became independent 1827, changing its name to Uruguay.

== See also ==
- European colonization of the Americas
- History of Portugal
- History of Portugal (1415–1578)
- Timeline of Portuguese history
