= Gangeshwar Mahadev Temple =

Hindu temple near Fudam Village, Diu, India

Gangeshwar Temple
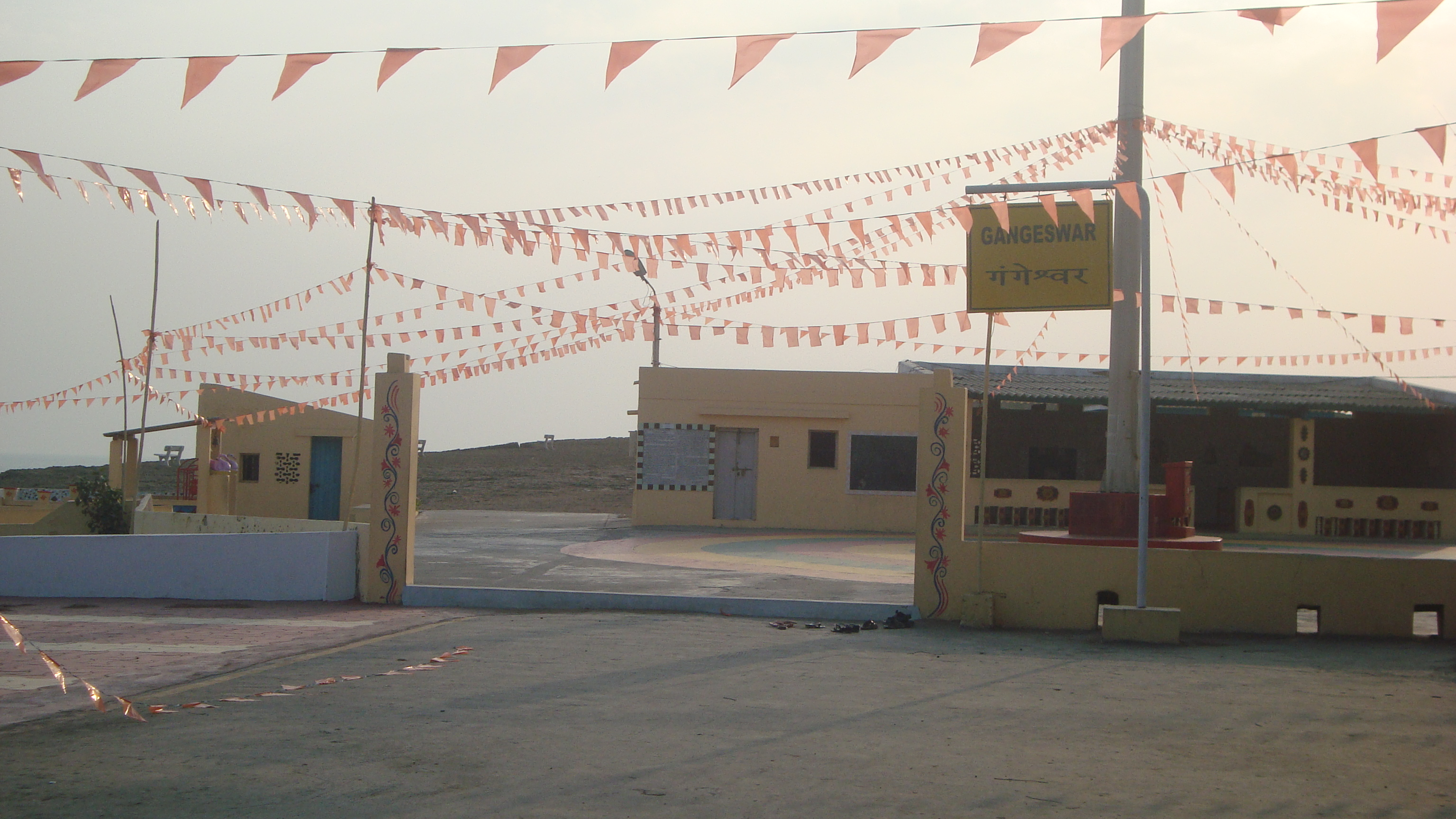

- Location in India

Religion
- Affiliation: Hinduism
- District: Diu
- Deity: Shiva

Location
- Location: Arabian Sea shore
- State: Dadra and Nagar Haveli and Daman and Diu
- Country: India
- Coordinates: 20°42′19″N 70°57′24″E

Architecture
- Type: Brutalist
- Completed: late 1900s

Specifications
- Monument: 5 lingas
- Inscriptions: none
- Elevation: 1 m (3 ft)

Gangeshwar Mahadev Temple (Hindi: गंगेश्वर माहदेव मंदिर) or simply Gangeshwar Temple is a Hindu temple dedicated to Lord Shiva (Mahadeva) located at seashore of Fudam village just 3 km away from Diu in the union territory of DNDD. The view of the temple is unique set on the Arabian Sea. This is basically a cave temple situated in the midst of the rocks on the seashore. Once pilgrims enter the cave Lord Ganesha, Lord Vishnu, and Goddess Lakshmi can be sight then five shivalingas could visible in different sizes in middle of the sea water, this is the very significant feature of the temple and above the rock the Shiva Linga Seshanag was carved to look out for the Shiva Linga. These lingas are generally submerged in the sea during high tides and only during the low tides chance to visible. This temple is also known as 'Seashore Temple' as Shiva Linga is situated on the seashore.

== Legends of origin ==
Sculptures at the temple

According to tradition, this temple is believed to be 5000 years old, though no archeological work has been carried out on the site to confirm this date.

According to legend, the establishment of this temple and carving of five lingas on the rock face was done by the Pandavas, while they were spending their anonymity in exile for worship of Lord Shiva on daily basis at the period of Mahabharata. The name Gangeshwar has been derived from Ganga and Iswar, it means the Lord of Ganga. Ganga was associated with Lord Shiva. When she was descending on the earth from heaven, it was Lord Shiva who held her waters in his jata to save the planet from her extreme current. Hence, Lord Shiva is also known as Gangadhar or Gangeshwar.
