= Daman and Diu Police =

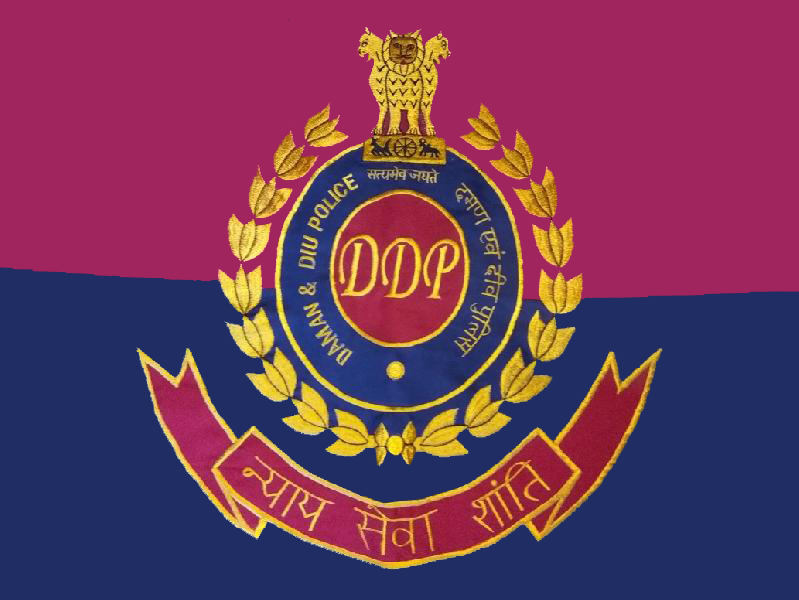
- Logo of Daman and Diu Police
- Abbreviation: DDP
- Motto: न्याय सेवा शांति Justice Service Peace

Agency overview
- Formed: 1961 (India)
- Preceding agency: Portuguese Police Force in India
- Dissolved: 2020
- Superseding agency: Dadra and Nagar Haveli and Daman and Diu Police

Jurisdictional structure
- Operations jurisdiction: Daman and Diu, India
- Area: 112.5 sq.km
- Population: 15,764
- Legal jurisdiction: Daman and Diu
- Governing body: Ministry of Home Affairs, Government of India
- General nature: Local civilian police

Operational structure
- Headquarters: Daman
- Parent agency: Government of India
- Districts: List: Daman district; Diu District

The Daman and Diu Police was the law enforcement agency for the former Union Territory of Daman and Diu in India. In 2020, it was merged into the Dadra and Nagar Haveli and Daman and Diu Police.

== Organizational structure ==
The Daman and Diu Police came under direct control of Department of Home Affairs of the government of Daman and Diu.

The Daman and Diu Police was headed by Director General of Police (DGP).
