= Nagoá Beach =

Beach in Dadra and Nagar Haveli and Daman and Diu, India

Coordinates: 20°42′19″N 70°54′57″E

Nagoá Beach is sandy coastline of the village of Nagoá in Diu district. It is located approximately 8 km from Diu. The town's main industry is tourism, and it has 21 km in length. The population is 14,000 but about 40,000 tourists enter the town during peak seasons. It used to be the site of a fort

It's a horseshoe shaped beach and located near Buchivará village. It is also the main tourist beach for Diu.
