= Lahari Bandar =

Lahari Bandar, also called Lahori Bandar or Lari Bandar, was a historical port city in southern Sindh. From the early 1300s until the late 1600s, it was the main port in Sindh and one of the main ports in western India.

== Names ==
According to Haig (1894), Lāhaṟī was the indigenous name used within Sindh, after the Lāhaṟ tribe that lived in that part of the delta, while Lāhorī was the name used outside Sindh, after its role as the port of Lahore. He connects it to the Lohāwar that al-Biruni uses for Lahore and says that it could have been Lohāwarānī, which would have been produced Lohārānī (the form used by al-Biruni) in common speech.

Meanwhile, Elliot (1867) says that the original name was Lárí Bandar, after the name Lár used for the southern part of Sindh.

The city was also called Larrybunder by English merchants in the early modern period. The Portuguese called it Diul, after the older port city of Debal, and the English also sometimes called it that too.

== History ==
Lahari Bandar is first mentioned in the early 11th century, by al-Biruni. Al-Biruni called it Lohārānī and wrote that it was near one of the two mouths of the Indus. It must have just been rising in importance at that time.

By the time of Ibn Battuta in the early 1300s, Lāharī had become the main port of Sindh, replacing Debal. Ibn Battuta "found it to be a fine town on the sea coast, possessing a large harbour, visited by merchants from Persia, Yemen, and other countries", and yielding a tax revenue of 6 million dinars – which was probably largely from customs duties. He also wrote that there were the ruins of an older city nearby, where there were lots of stones, including some shaped like people and animals. The locals, he related, said that the inhabitants of the old city had been so wicked that God "transformed them, their beasts, their herbs, even to the very seeds, into stones".

In the following centuries, Lahari Bandar was one of the four main ports on the western coast of India (the others were Khambhat, Kollam, and Calicut). It served as the port of Thatta, three days upstream. It also had close links with Gujarat and Portuguese-controlled Hormuz in the 16th century. Lahari Bandar's position in the southern Indus Delta was naturally well-suited to being a major entrepôt. It had a rich agricultural hinterland and access to desirable textiles such as silk and cotton.

When Akbar took Sindh in 1592, he immediately began to develop Lahari Bandar as imperial seaport. It was seen as strategically important enough that Akbar put it under direct administration (khalisa). He also had two large ocean-going ships built at Lahore, his capital, to be put to sea at Lahari Bandar and then operate in the Red Sea. The Ain-i-Akbari lists Lahari Bandar as a mahal in the sarkar of Thatta, with a total revenue of 5,521,419 dams.

Lahari Bandar was a major port during the 17th century. The Shahjahannama wrote hyperbolically that Lahari Bandar was such a big port that it could accommodate 1,000 ships at a time. The account of Alexander Hamilton describes the commercial activity that took place at 17th-century Lahari Bandar: whenever a ship approached the port, a gun was fired to inform local merchants of its arrival. They would then approach the ship in smaller boats called ghurabs to negotiate terms. Ships that "did not belong to the port" were not allowed to anchor in the channel and instead had to dock outside the city. Once the ship had anchored, its cargo was unloaded – as many as 200 to 300 tons of goods would be brought on a single ship – and then shipped to Thatta, either by smaller boats or overland, by pack animals. Jean de Thevenot visited in 1660 and wrote that it was a better harbour "than any other place".

Before the English came, the Portuguese were the only European element. They maintained a trade monopoly here and did not allow foreign merchants to enter without a carta (pass) issued by them. They often issued them to merchants from Basra, Hormuz, or Muscat. The shahbandar, or comptroller of the port, was often concerned with a loss of Portuguese trade revenue and tried to keep them in good humour. In 1635, the English factor Methwold managed to negotiate an agreement with the Portuguese that allowed the English to trade at Lahari Bandar as well, resulting in the English setting up a factory here.

The English apparently considered Lahari Bandar a freer port than Thatta – at Thatta, the governor controlled the prices, but at Lahari Bandar they were publicly known and not subject to the governor's whims. The main English factor at the time was John Spiller, and the local merchants Bumabamal and Navaldas worked with the English and got a cut of the profits.

A letter from Spiller to the Bakhshi ul-Mamalik (the second-highest-ranking member of the Mughal administration, tasked with the army and intelligence) in 1646-7 offers special insight into the Mughal administration of Lahari Bandar at the time. Law and order was placed under a faujdar (aka governor or commandant) who was referred to as a hakim and was subordinate to the governor of the entire subah. The shahbandar derived his power from control of trade and was not a subordinate of the faujdar. Criminal cases were brought before a qazi, who submitted documents to both the faujdar and the shahbandar - but the shahbandar does not appear to have necessarily been bound by the qazi's rulings.

At that time, the faujdar of Lahari Bandar was Asaf Khan, who had been in charge since at least 1620. He had apparently held Lahari Bandar in jagir and then by 1640 farmed it out to Mir Zarif, later known as Fidai Khan, who became shahbandar in his own right. Fidai Khan was later succeeded as shahbandar by Hakim Khwushhal.

In the late 17th century, Lahari Bandar suffered from famine, disease, and silting up of its harbour. By the time Alexander Hamilton visited in 1699, it was "a shadow of its former self". He wrote at the time, "it is but a village of about 100 houses, built of crooked sticks and mud".

In the 18th century, Lahari Bandar is shown in the Mirat-ul-Hind as a separate sarkar in its own right, comprising two mahals. Lahari Bandar was eventually eclipsed by Karachi as Sindh's premier seaport.

== Location ==
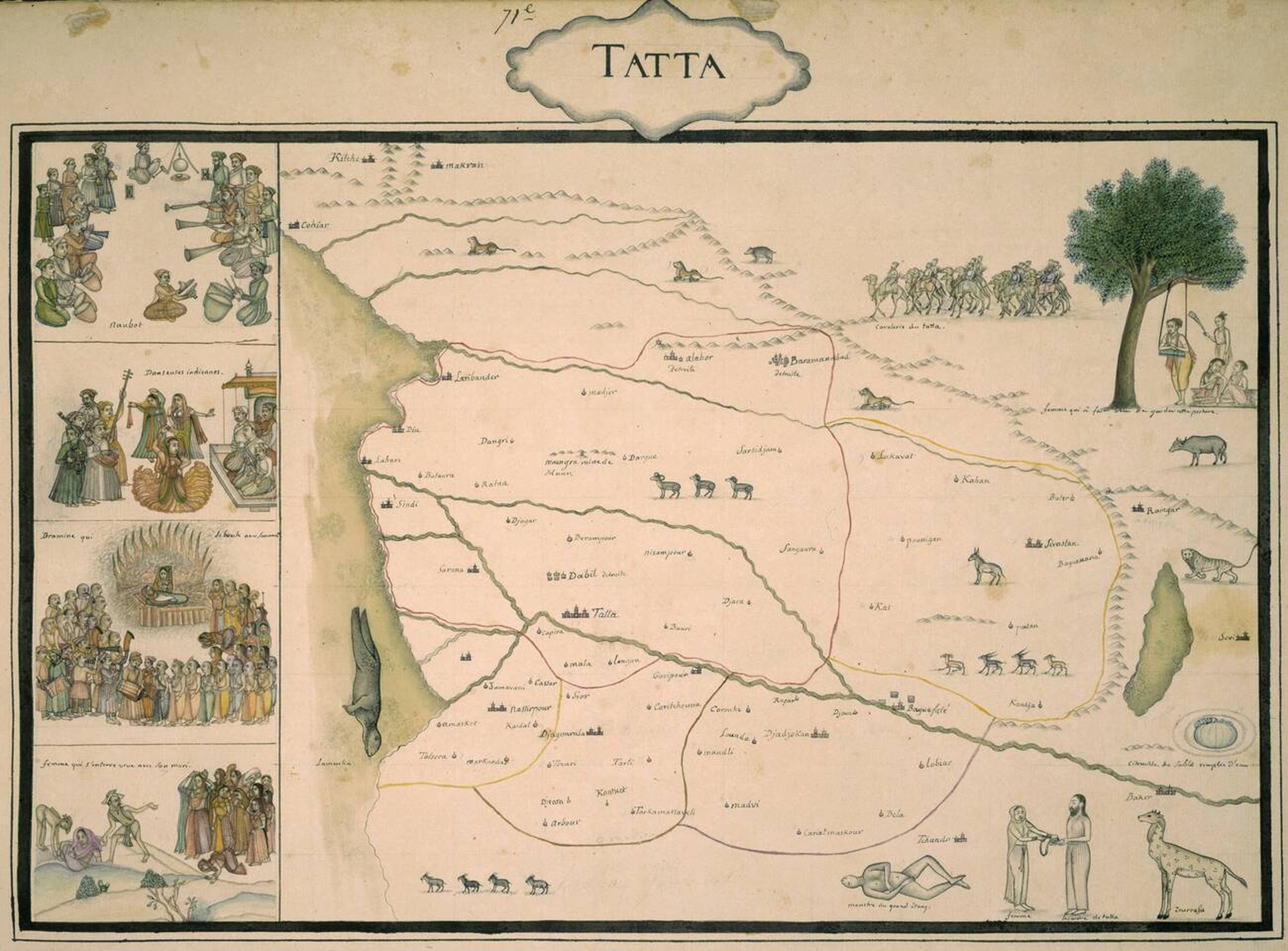
Elaborately illustrated map of the Thatta Subah of the Mughal Empire, commissioned by Jean Baptiste Joseph Gentil, ca.1770. The claimed location of Lahari Bandar is marked on the map.

Lahari Bandar's exact location is unknown. Some have proposed that Lahari Bandar is identical with the earlier Debal, such as by the Tuhfat-ul-kiram. Mir Ma'sum also claimed that Lahari Bandar was identical with both Debal and Thatta. Syed Shakir Ali Shah (1996) has also proposed that both Debal and Lahari Bandar were at Juna Shah Bandar (aka Jaki Bandar, in Mirpur Sakro taluka of Thatta district at 24°37′ N, 67°22′ E). Excavation here revealed the presence of an earlier fort beneath the currently visible ruins. However, Haig (1894) wrote that Lahari Bandar was probably further downstream. Paliwal (1999) wrote that Lahari Bandar is on the old Baggaur channel of the Indus at 24°31' N, 67°24' E.

== See also ==
- Debal
- Shahbandar (Pakistan)
