= Simbor =

Simbor 'Enseada de Simbor'
- Former Military Outpost
- Location within India Location within Gujarat
- Coordinates: 20.76217°N 71.14983°E
- Country: India
- Union territory: DNDD
- District: Diu

Simbor is a territory of 0.91 square kilometers located in the estuary of the Sahil River (called Rio Vançoso by the Portuguese) in the cove of Simbor, about 25 km east of Diu. Since its establishment in the early 18th century, this exclave was subordinate to the District of Diu, Portuguese India, until it was annexed by India in December 1961, along with the rest of Portuguese India. Simbor (also Simar or Simarbandar) is now part of the District of Diu, one of the three districts of the union territory of Dadra and Nagar Haveli and Daman and Diu.

The exclave has a very thin population, essentially a floating fishing community for part of the year only. Simbor is unincorporated and is part of the Diu Municipal Area and is administered by the Diu Municipal Council and the government of Dadra and Nagar Haveli and Daman and Diu.

== Territory ==
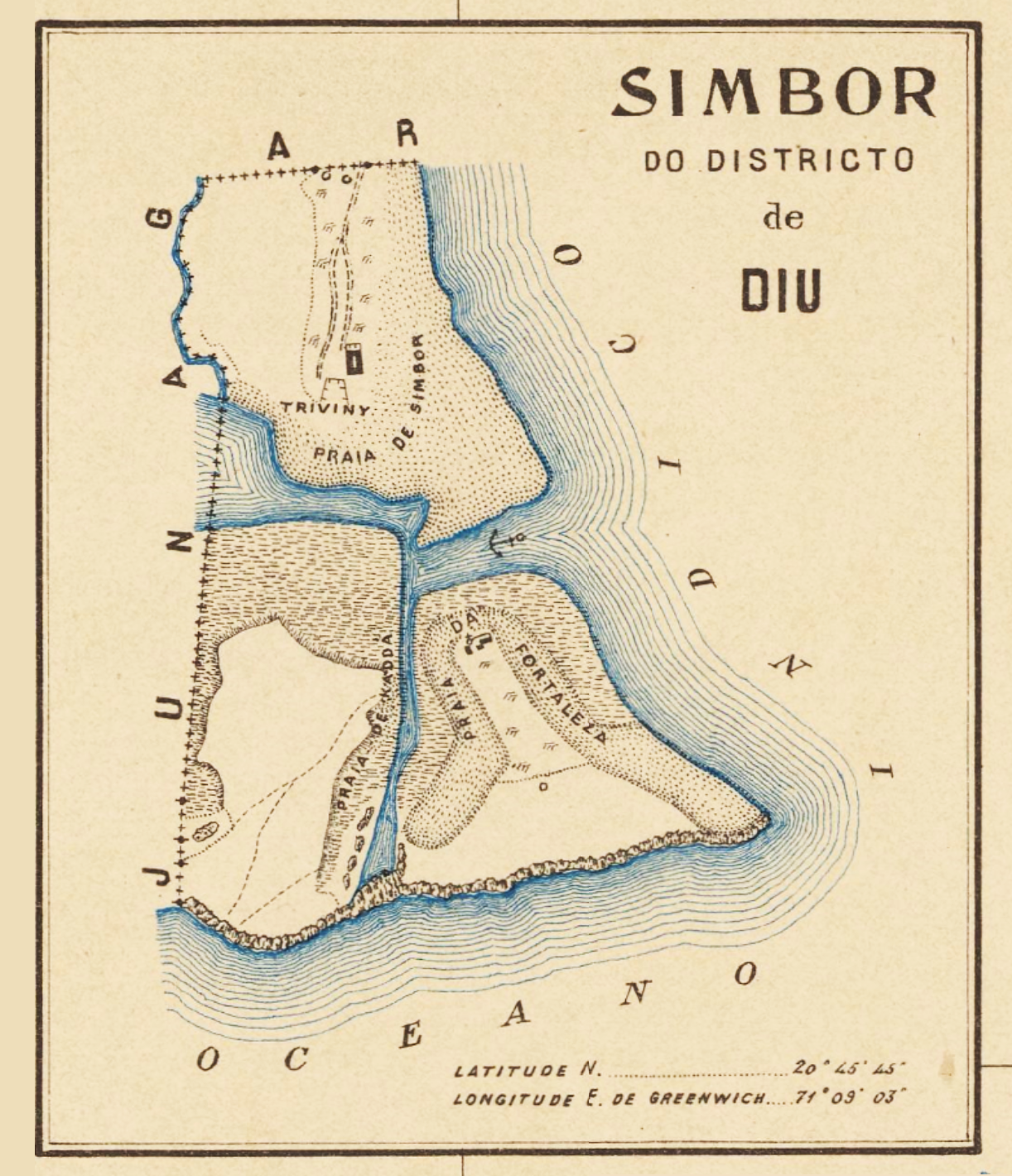
Insert of Simbor on a 1911 map of Diu

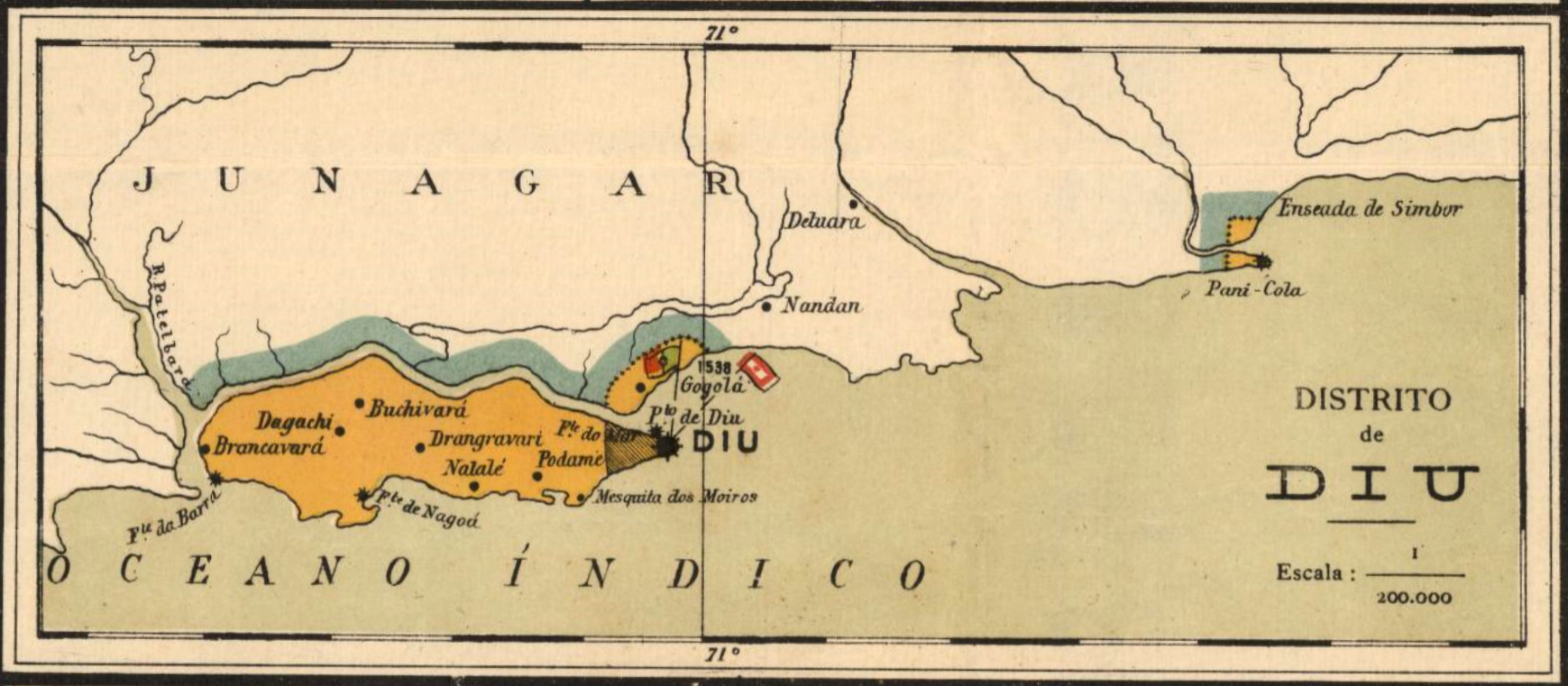
Portuguese map showing the district of Diu, including Simbor

The territory of the present-day exclave of Simbor is the same as it was in the colonial era. It consists of two plots of land on either side of the estuary of the Sahil (Vançoso) River and an islet at the mouth of the river on which is built Fort St. Anthony of Simbor. The village of Simbor (Simar), which in the early days had been occupied by the Portuguese for a brief period is not part of the territory. It lies about 2 km to the northeast and is part of Gujarat State.

There were no permanent settlements other than Fort St. Anthony and no local administration during the colonial period. The terrain is flat and barren. A Portuguese governor who visited the exclave in 1924 lamented that the Portuguese territory consisted only of three small sandy and arid plots of land.

== Population ==
Fish drying racks on the beach at Simbor

Today, as during the Portuguese period, the territory of Simbor does not have a permanent population. Rather, transient communities of fishers belonging to one or the other of the traditional fishing castes have been fishing and living along the coast of southern Gujarat, including the bay of Simbor, for centuries. During the second half of the 19th century, the Machhis had become the main suppliers of bombolim, the fish they had caught and sundried in the bay of Simbor that was eaten by the population of Diu during the monsoon season. In the mid-20th century the Machhis introduced the bag net stationary fishery which became widely practiced in the area due to the suitable marine condition of strong currents and shallow seabed. Subsequently, the Kolis who gradually took the place of the Machhis, adopted that method. The introduction of bag net fishery in the coastal villages around Simbor transformed the livelihoods of the local Kolis from basic subsistence-based to an ability to earn a comparatively good income. Today, Koli women and children continue to dry the fish on racks on the beach of the Diu-ruled territory of Simbor, as they have been doing for generations. The fish sorting and fish drying activities, as well as the huts made of palm leaves where live the fishers and their families — a few hundred people — are a familiar scene in the exclave of Simbor during the fishing season.

Some small-scale fishing boat building activities have been developing in recent years just outside Simbor, on Gujarat State territory.

== History ==
The creation of this Portuguese dependency can be traced back to the early 18th century when Ramogi Varer, leader of a band of Sanganian pirates, built a small fortified position on an islet at the mouth of the Vançoso River in the cove of Sambor, 25 km east of Diu. In 1722, Diu Governor Luís de Melo Pereira organised an expedition which captured the position and burned the pirates’ vessels. The Portuguese then decided to rebuild the existing fortification into a regular fort which was named Forte Santo António de Simbor. They also occupied the shores directly facing the position as well as the important village of Simbor 2.5 km inland, including the valuable water well of Dan-Kui. The conquest was initially welcomed by the government in Goa and a plan of the projected fort was sent to Lisbon. However, the authorities soon decided that the expenses incurred in connection with the upkeep of one more fortress were unjustified, and it was decided to demolish the new fort and use the material to obstruct the river to prevent its use by pirates. The demolition order issued in 1726 was postponed twice before it was finally decided to keep Simbor and restore the fort. The creation and consolidation of the state of the nawab of Junagadh in the mid-18th century was to give rise to never-ending conflicts. Junagadh, which bordered on both Diu and Simbor, resented the fact that Portuguese control of the estuary of the Vançoso River impeded trade. It resented in particular the levy of anchorage fees on native boats, especially during the monsoon when the little bay was clogged with vessels taking shelter in the cove. Also, given Junagadh's recurrent water shortage, Portuguese control over the Dan-Kui well, whose access they restricted, was another contentious point. There were also border disputes since the extent of the Simbor had never been clearly defined.

In the mid-19th century, the Portuguese government was pressured by Junagadh, backed by the authorities of British India, to initiate talks to resolve outstanding conflicts. The treaty signed with Junagadh in 1859 reduced Portuguese sovereignty on the mainland, which had never been extensive, to two small strips of land on either side of the estuary. Portugal, which had already lost the village of Simbor in the 18th century, lost more territory adjacent to the village, making it impossible to access the Dan-Kui well, thus making the fort more dependent on the cistern for drinking water. While the estuary of the river and the bay remained under Portuguese control, the lucrative right to levy anchorage fees was abolished. On the positive side, Portuguese soldiers, if unarmed, were permitted to cross Junagadh's territory when transiting from Diu to Simbor.

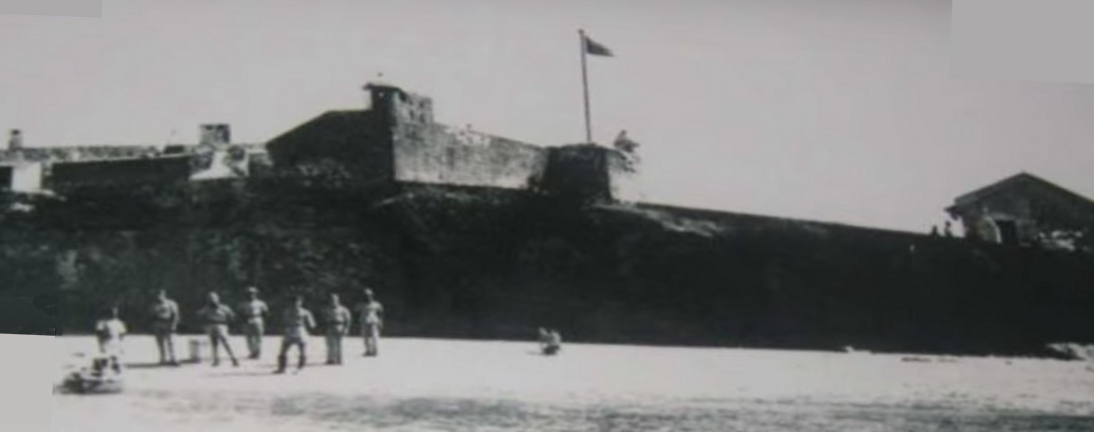
Portuguese soldiers standing in front of the fort

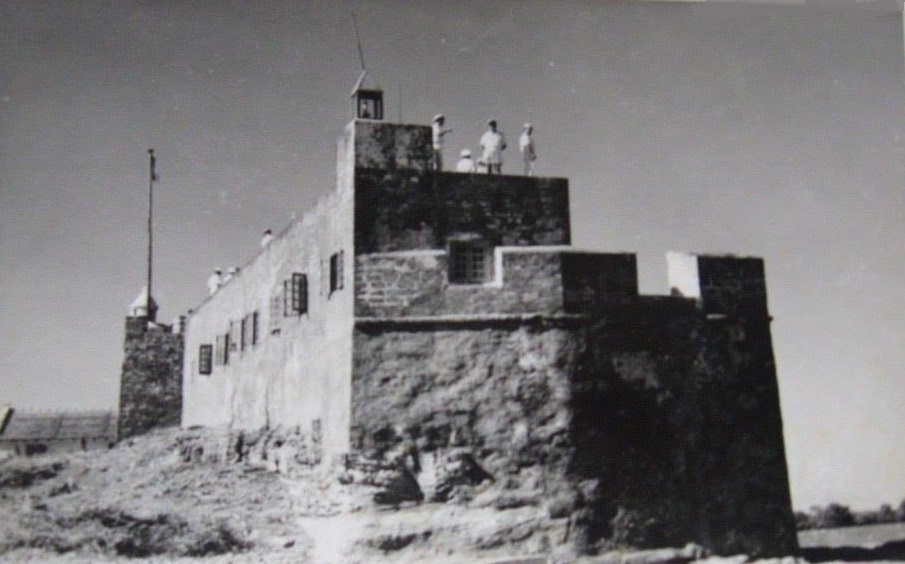
The fort c. 1950

The treaty further stipulated that since the point of confluence of three waterways (the Vançoso River plus two creeks) in the estuary constituted a Triveni, Brahmins were to be allowed to hold rituals and burn Hindu corpses at that point, while Portuguese subjects could not fish or conduct any other activities at that location. In addition, the authorities of Junagadh, if they so wished, could enclose the sacred location within a hedge or wall. Although the Hindus never availed themselves of the right to use that space, Junagadh did build a stone wall there in 1892, and requested permission in 1917 to rebuild it. This request prompted Diu Governor Raúl do Amaral to send a report to the governor-general at Goa tracing the history of the multiple conflicts related to Simbor, pointing out that the treaty of 1859 had brought nothing but humiliations for Portugal. The treaty had not eliminated all sources of friction with respect to Simbor, one being the occasional smuggling of alcohol to avoid paying Junagadh's abkari (tax on liquor and the issuance of liquor licenses), and another being the inadequate policing of the Simbor waters by the Portuguese during the monsoon months when the cove became overcrowded with boats seeking shelter.

A report from 1889 pointed out that, despite the near total abandonment of the fort, the activities of fishermen in the waters of the exclave contributed to the small economy of Diu, since they supplied nearly all the dried fish eaten by the population of Diu during the monsoon. Nevertheless, officials more than once suggested that Simbor along with its fort, which has long ceased to serve any practical purpose, should be abandoned or exchanged. The governor of Diu who visited the exclave in 1924 lamented that Portuguese territory consisted only of three small sandy and arid plots of land, adding that following the last cyclone the fort now lay half-ruined. The small garrison of the fort constituted the only permanent settlement of the small territory.

In 1954, in conjunction with similar events in the Daman enclaves of Dadra and Nagar Haveli, merger activists from India occupied Fort Santo António then withdrew after having hoisted the Indian flag. On 19 December 1961, in the course of the Indian invasion of Portuguese India, the small garrison of the fort was the last military contingent to surrender in Portuguese India, through the intermediary of a Portuguese officer of Diu who had reached Fort Santo António on an Indian army vessel.

== See also ==
- Fort St. Anthony of Simbor
- Diu
- Estado Português da Índia

== Bibliography ==
- Fortim de Santo António
- PEREIRA, A.B. de Bragança, Etnografia da Índia Portuguesa
