= Diu district =

- District
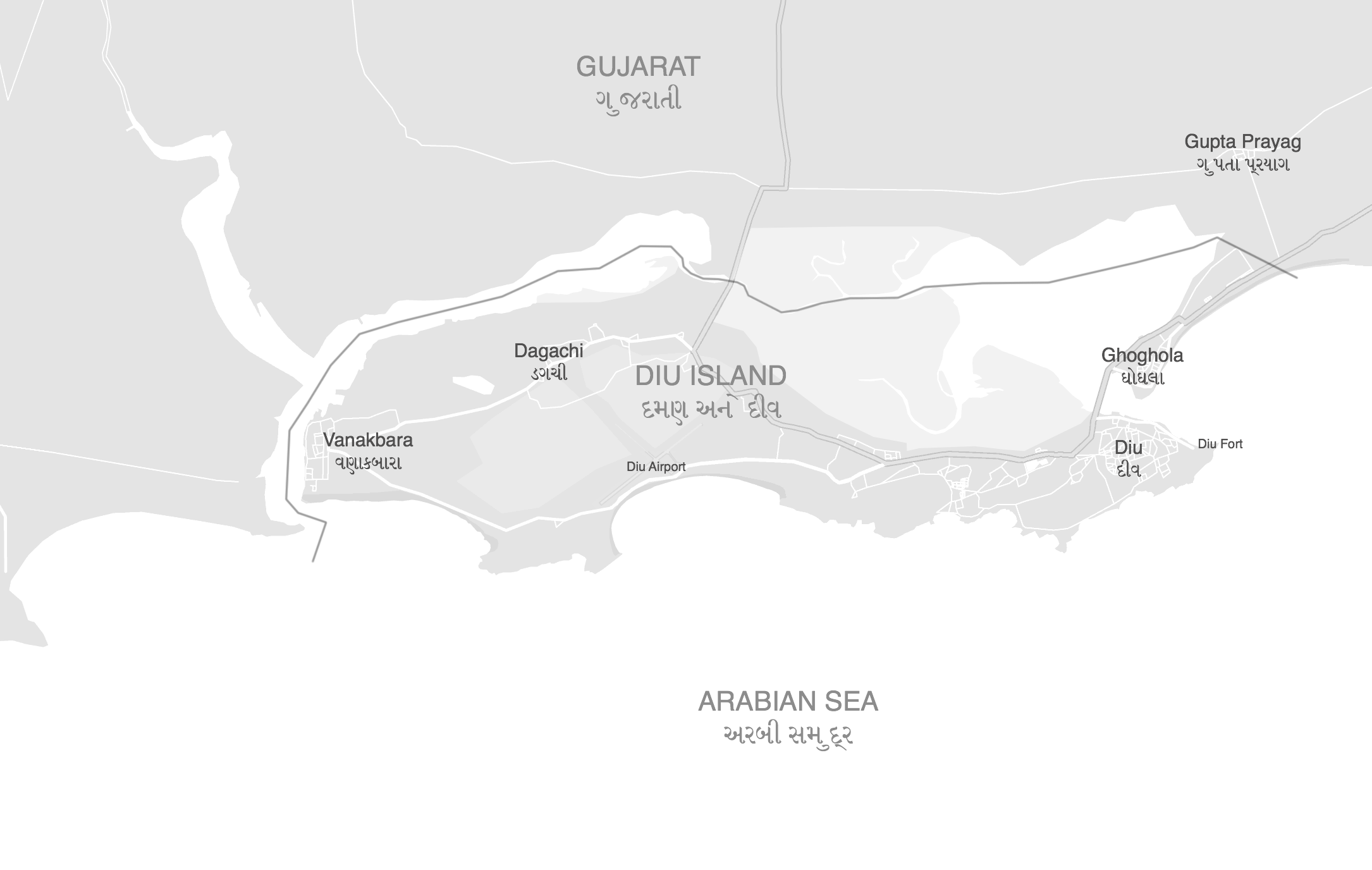
- Map of Diu district, the exclave of Simbor is not shown

- Diu district location
- Coordinates: 20.71°N 70.98°E
- Country: India
- Union Territory: Dadra and Nagar Haveli and Daman and Diu
- Headquarter: Diu Town

Area
  - Total: 40 km^{2} (15 sq mi)
- Elevation: 30 m (98 ft)

Population (2011)
  - Total: 52,074
  - Density: 1,300/km^{2} (3,400/sq mi)
- Demonym: Diucar/ Diuese

Languages
  - Official: Hindi, English
  - Additional official: Gujarati
- Website: http://diu.gov.in/

Diu district is one of the three districts of the union territory of Dadra and Nagar Haveli and Daman and Diu of India. The district is made up of Diu Island and two small enclaves of Simbor and Gogola, at the border with the state of Gujarat. The district headquarters are at Diu Town. It is the ninth least populous district in the country (out of 640).

== History ==
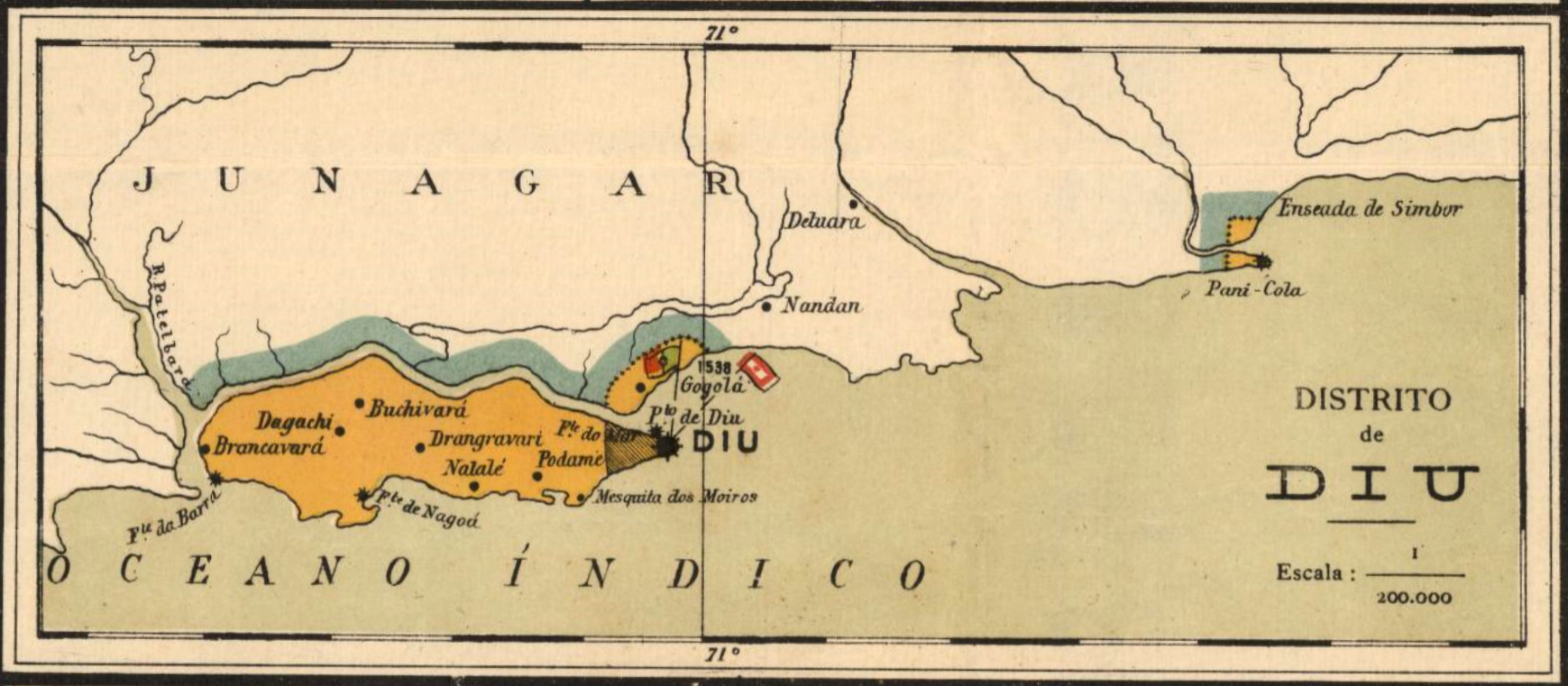
Distrito de Dio, India Portuguesa (1920).

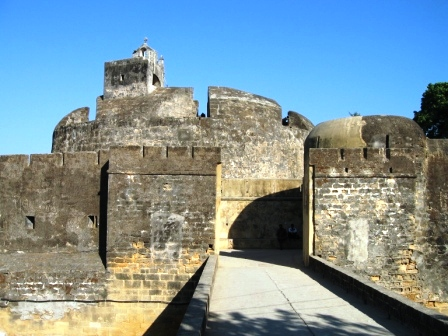
The Diu Fortress was built in 1535 by the Portuguese, when Bahadur Shah, the Sultan of Gujarat, requested their help to resist an attack by Humayun, the second Moghal emperor.

The district was historically part of the Saurashtra region of Gujarat. Mirroring the system of administrative division in Portugal, Diu district (Distrito de Diu) was established as an administrative division of the Portuguese State of India (Estado da Índia) in the first half of the 19th century. It was headed by a district governor, subordinate to the governor-general of Portuguese India in Goa. The district included the single municipality of Diu, which was further subdivided into civil parishes.

It remained an overseas territory of Portugal until it was annexed by Indian forces on 19 December 1961. From 1961 to 1987, it was a part of the union territory of Goa, Daman and Diu. In 1987, it became a part of the newly formed union territory of Daman and Diu. In January 2020, the district became part of the new union territory of Dadra and Nagar Haveli and Daman and Diu.

== Geography ==
Diu district occupies an area of 40 square kilometres (15 sq mi),

It consists of Diu Island and a part on the mainland (the Ghogolá peninsula). 20 km East of Diu Island, is the small territory of Simbor.

== Sub-districts ==
=== Diu Island ===
The town of Diu and most of the district's villages and settlements are on Diu Island. Many of these places have been renamed since the Invasion of 1961.

Settlement type	Portuguese name	Indian name
Town	Diu	Diu
Village	Podamo	Fudam
Village	Bunxivará	Bucharwada
Settlement	Dangarvadi	Dangarwadi
Village	Brancavará	Vanakbara
Uninhabited	Fortim do Mar	Pani Kota
Uninhabited	Castilo de Diu	Diu Fortress

=== Ghogholá ===
The area on the mainland borders Gir Somnath district of Gujarat. It contains the village of Ghogholá. The village lies on the mainland opposite the eastern end of the island .

=== Simbor ===
The tiny territory of Simbor, located about 25 km east of the town of Diu, is also part of the district. It has no permanent population.

== Demographics ==
According to the 2011 census Diu district has a population of 52,074, roughly equal to the nation of Saint Kitts and Nevis. This gives it a ranking of 631st in India (out of a total of 640). The district has a population density of 1,301 inhabitants per square kilometre (3,370/sq mi) . Its population growth rate over the decade 2001-2011 was 17.73%. Diu has a sex ratio of 1030 females for every 1000 males, and a literacy rate of 83.36%.

There is a small community of the variety of Indo-Portuguese creole spoken in the region known as Daman and Diu Portuguese Creole.

== Sister cities ==
Diu Island is twinned with the city of Loures, in Portugal.

== Landmarks ==
Diu is home to a few surviving buildings and monuments with Portuguese architecture. The best preserved are the churches and fortifications.

The nearest railway junction is Veraval, which is 90 km from Diu. Major cities like Mumbai, Ahmedabad, Pune, Jabalpur (Madhya Pradesh), Dwarka and Thiruvananthapuram are directly connected to Veraval Railway Station. Delwada is 8 km from Diu.

=== Churches and chapels ===
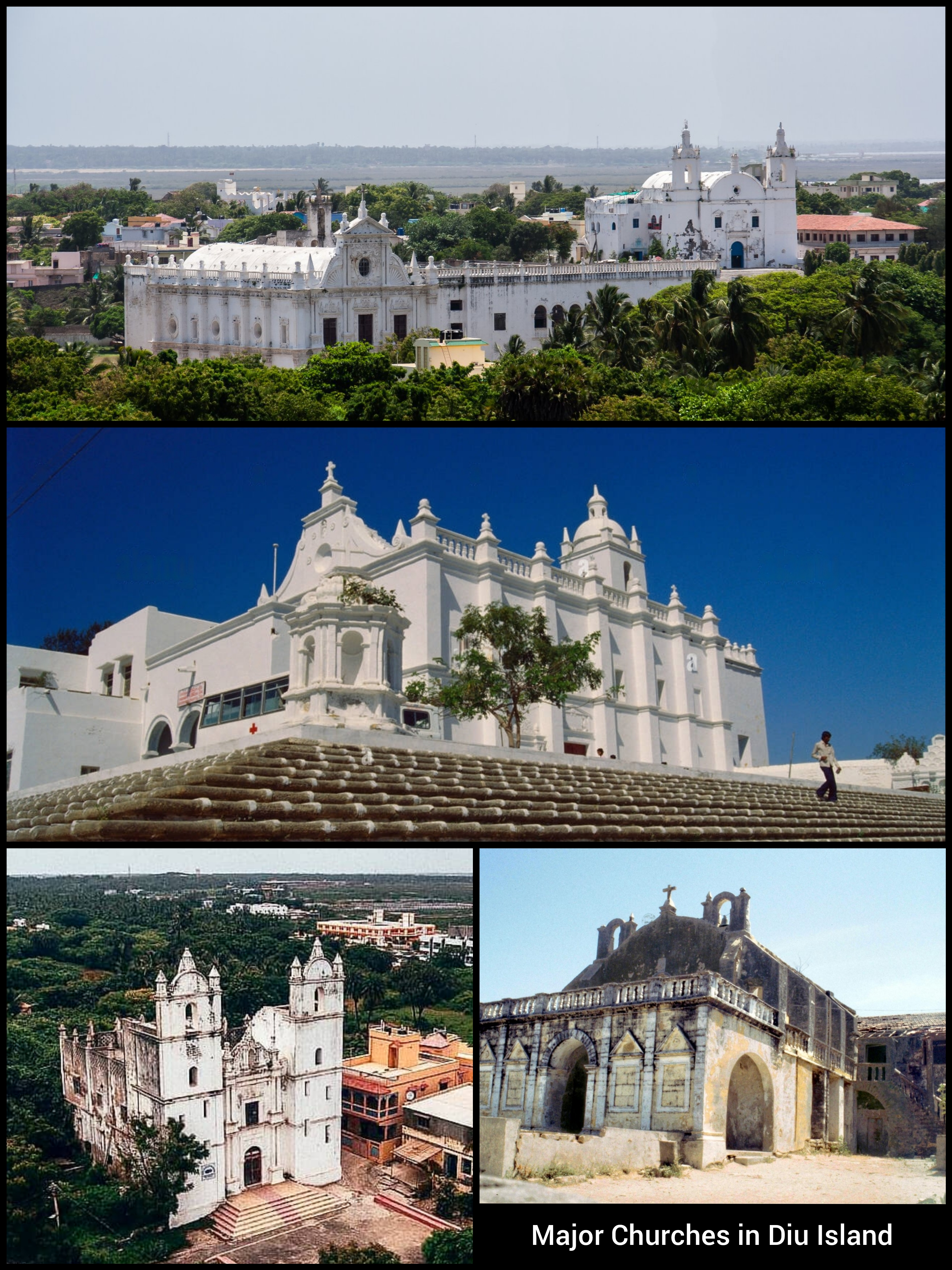
Major Church Buildings on Diu Island (Anticlockwise from top): 1. Churches of St. Paul and St. Thomas (Diu); 2. Church of St. Francis of Assisi (Diu); 3. Church of Our Lady of Remedes (Fudam); 4. Church of Our Lady of Mercy (Vanakbara)

There has been a steady exodus of Christians from Diu ever since the Invasion of 1961. This has led to many of their historic and historic and religious sites being victims of abandonment, disrepair, conversion to secular use or demolishment.

Type	Portuguese Name	English Translation	Location	Current Status
Cathedral	Catedral de São Paulo (Sé)	Church of St. Paul	Diu Town	Active (demoted to church)
Church	Igreja de São Tomás	Church of St. Thomas	Diu Town	Secularized (Museum)
Church	Igreja de São Francisco de Assis	Church of St. Francis of Assisi	Diu Town	Secularized (Hospital)
Church	Igreja de São João de Deus	Church of St. John of God	Diu Town	Inactive (Ruins)
Church	Igreja de Nossa Senhora da Esperança	Church of Our Lady of Hope	Diu town	Inactive (Ruins)
Church	Igreja da Misericórdia	Church of Mercy (informally 'Fort Church')	Diu Fort	Inactive (Ruins)
Church	Igreja de Nossa Senhora dos Remédios	Church of Our Lady of Remedies	Podamo	Active
Church	Igreja de Nossa Senhora da Misericórdia	Church of Our Lady of Mercy	Brancavará	Inactive (Intact)
Convent	Convento dos Dominicanos	Dominican Convent	Diu town	Demolished (1961)
Convent	Convento de Santa Ana	Convent of St. Anne	Diu Town	Active (School)
Chapel	Capela de São Tiago	Chapel of St. James	Diu Fort	Inactive (Ruins)
Chapel	Capela de São Martinho	Chapel of Saint Martin	Diu Fort	Demolished (2023)
Chapel	Capela de Nossa Senhora da Vitória	Chapel of Our Lady of Victory	Fortim do Mar	Inactive (Ruins)

=== Fortresses ===
Due to constant invasions from neighboring kingdoms as well as distant powers, the Portuguese built several fortifications all over the district. Most survived to this day, although some have little to no physical traces of their existence.

Portuguese Name	English Translation	Location	Current Status
Cidadela de Diu	Diu Fortress	Diu Town	
Fortim do Mar	Panikota	Diu Town	Ruin
Forte Santo Antonio	Fort St. Anthony of Simbor	Simbor	Ruin
Forte de Nagoá	-	Nagoá near Podamo	Ruins lost
Forte de Barra	-	Brancavará	Ruins lost

=== Beaches ===
- Nagoá Beach, most visited beach in on Diu.
- Ghogolá Beach, largest beach off the island of Diu.
- Chakratirth Beach
- Barra Beach
- Nadia Caves

=== Gallery ===
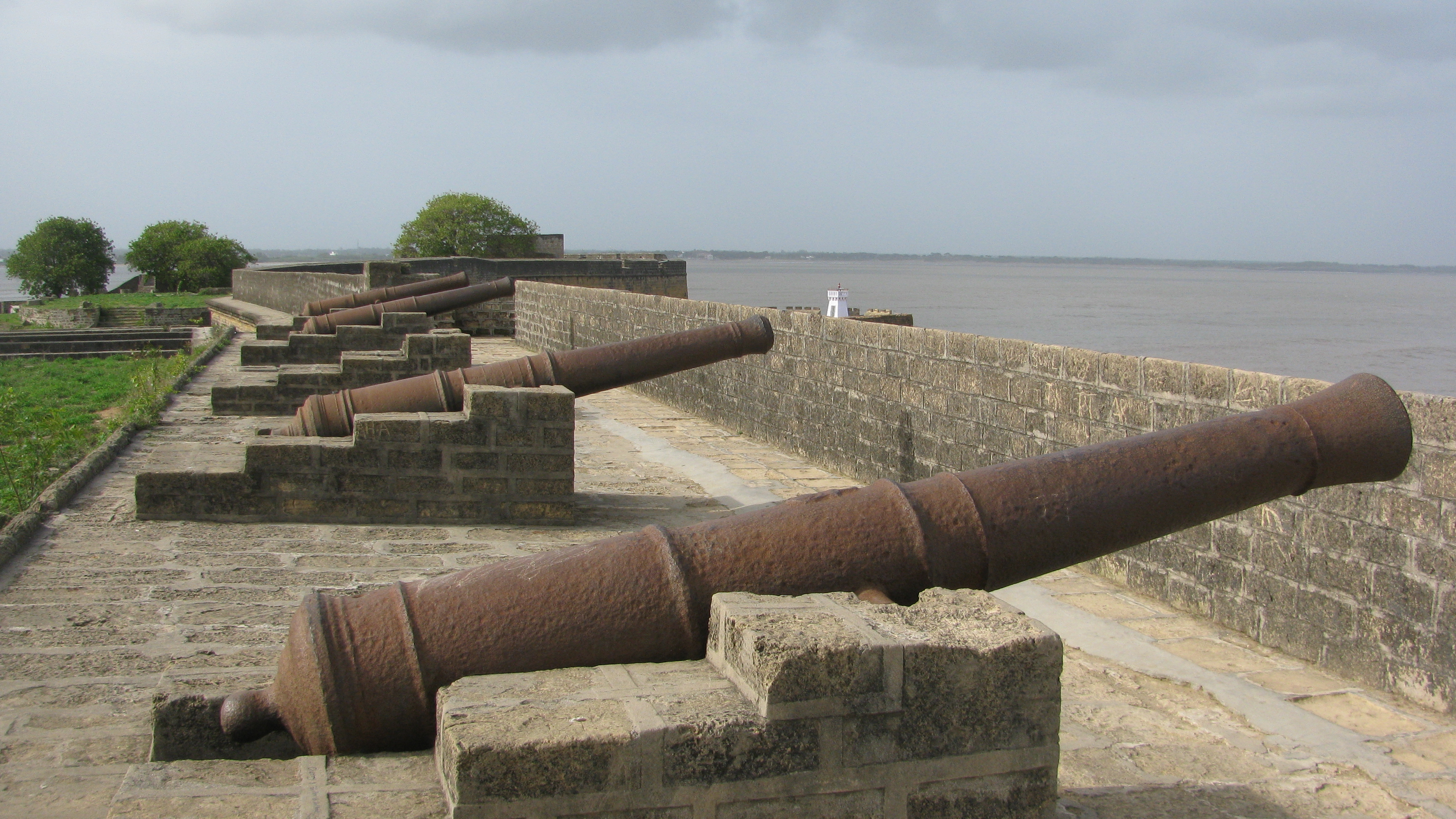
Diu Fort Fixed Cannons

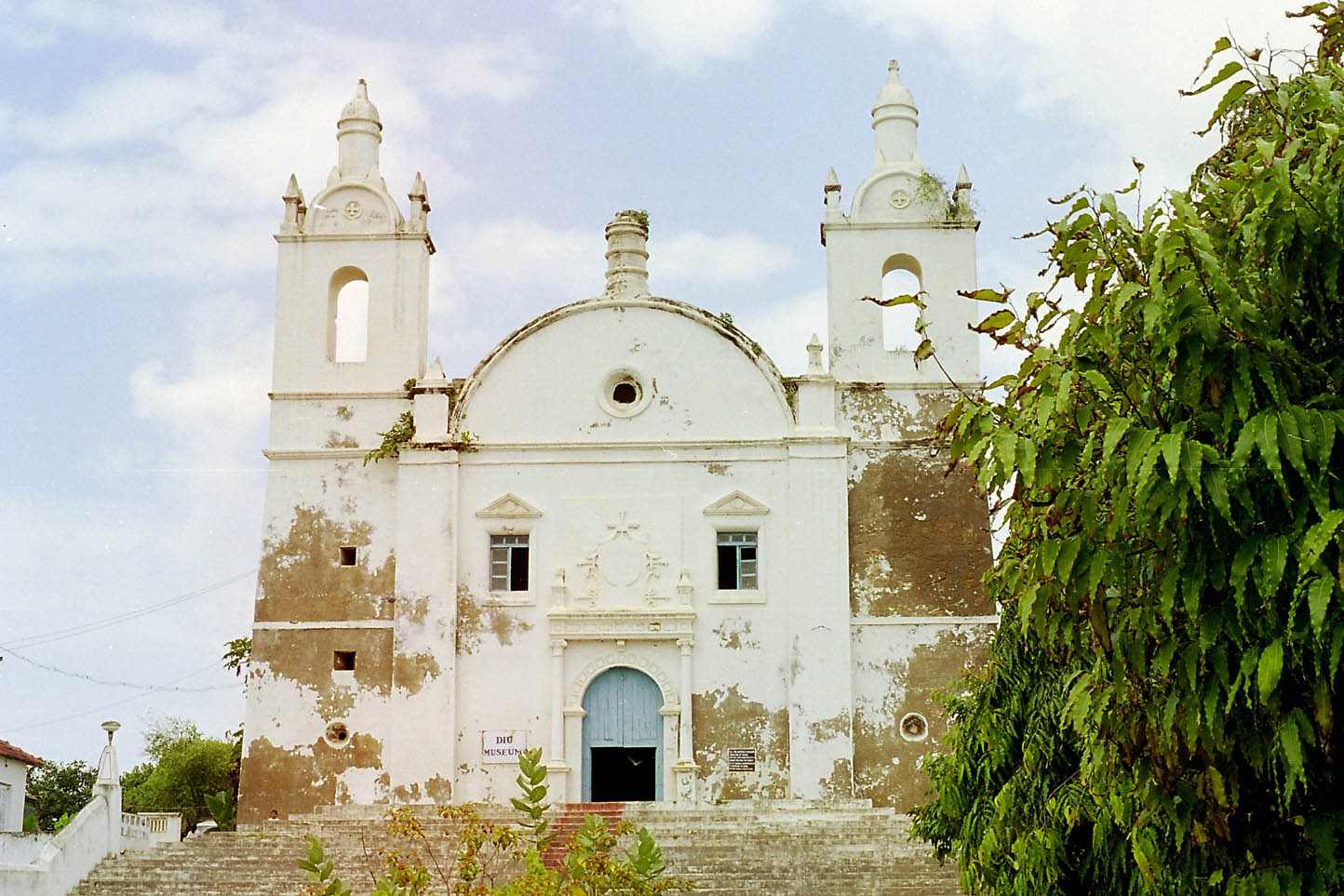
St. Thomas Church, Diu

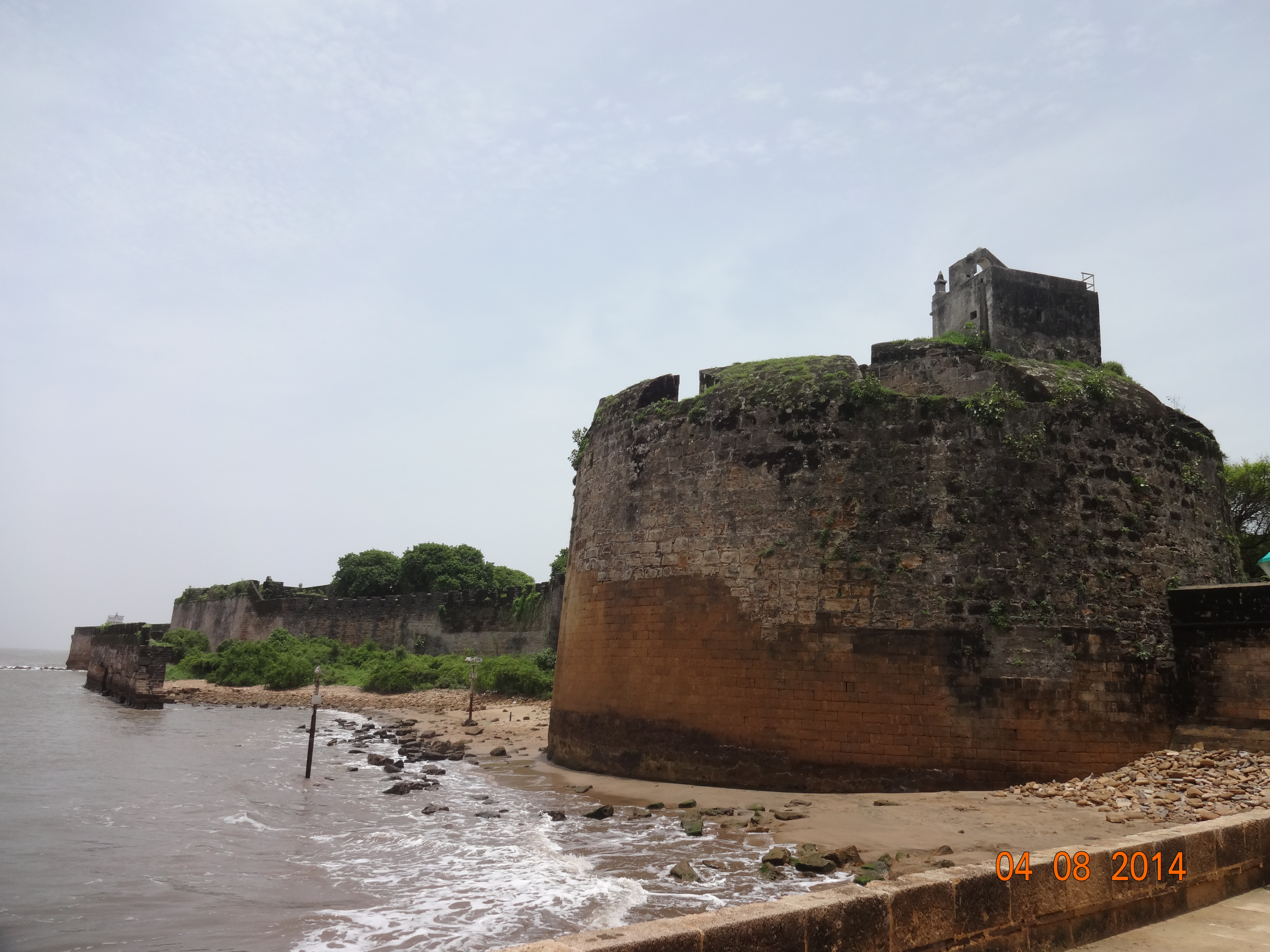
Diu fort

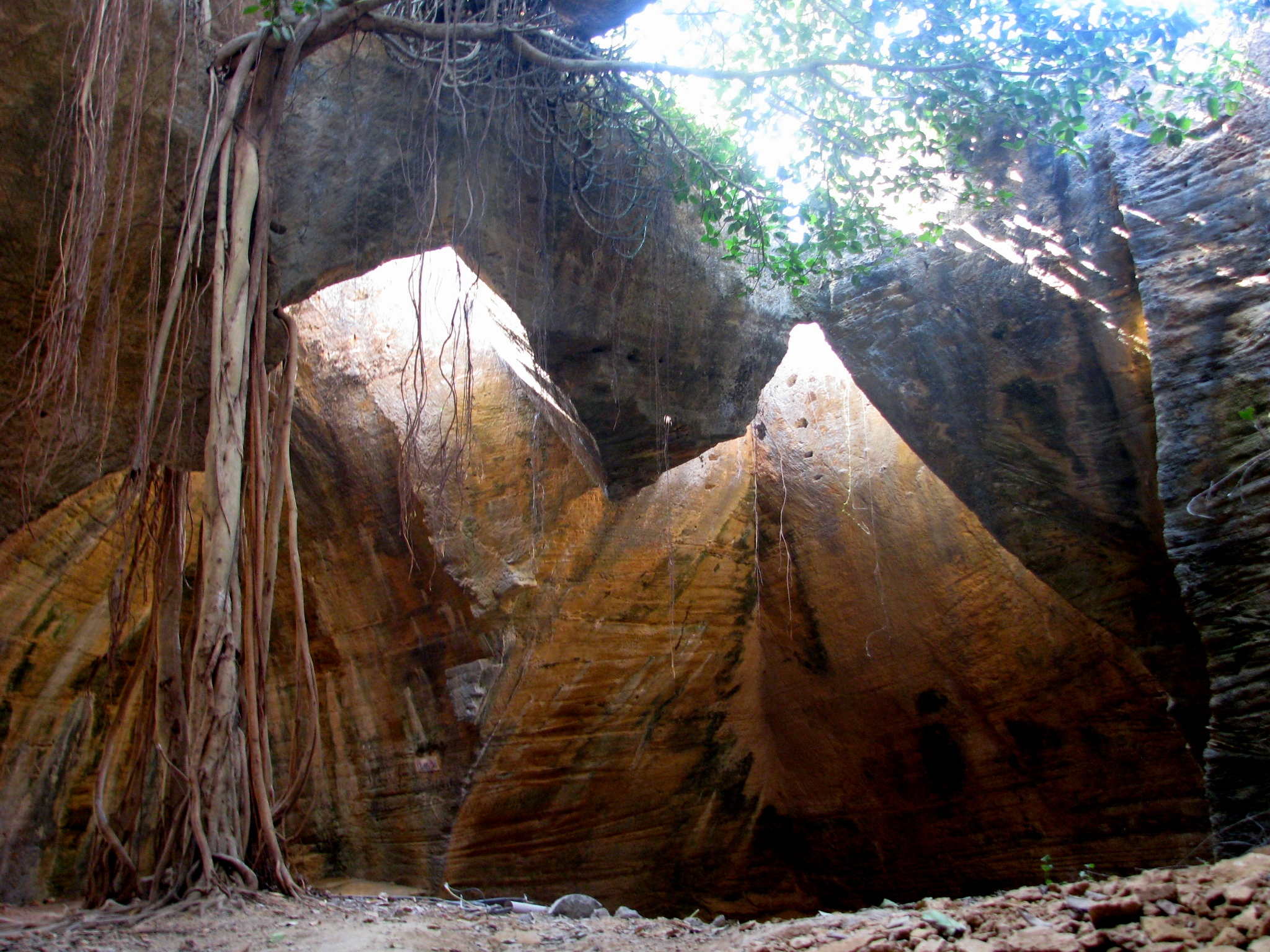
Nadia Caves of Diu

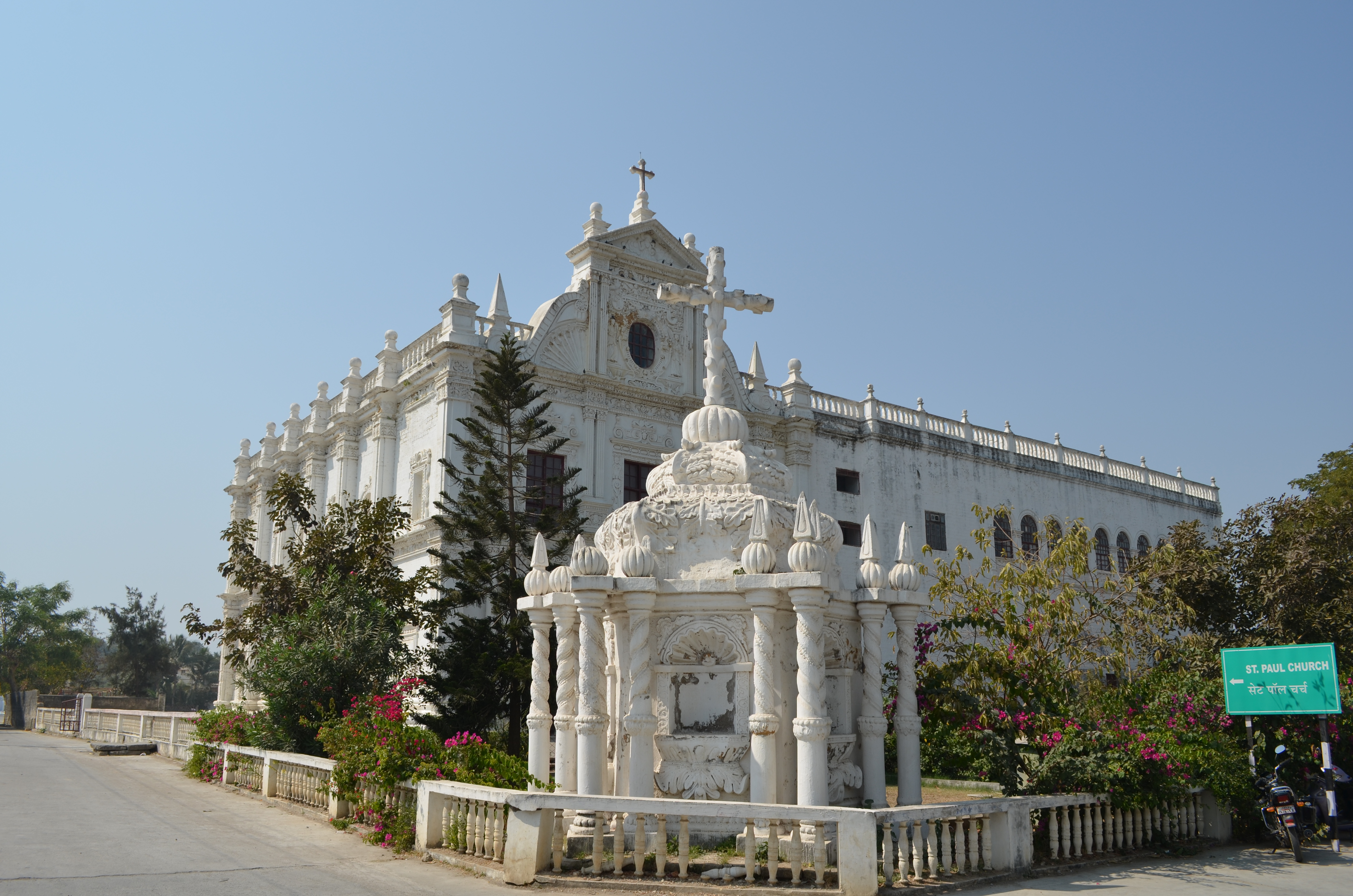
St. Paul's Church, Diu

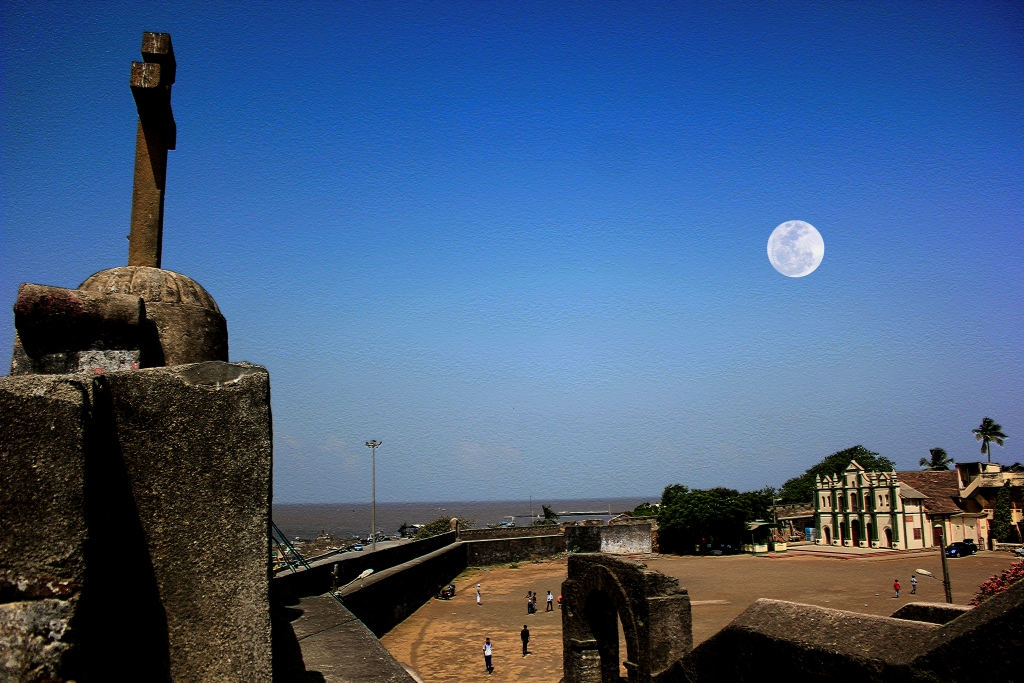
Church in Nani Daman Fort

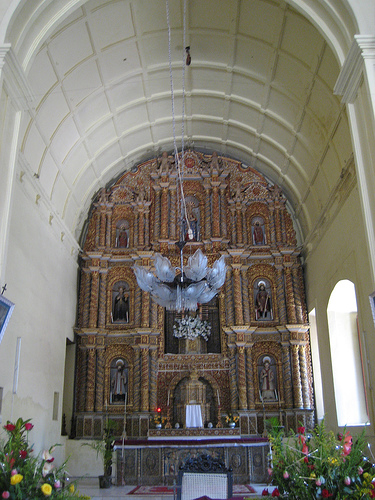
Se Cathedral

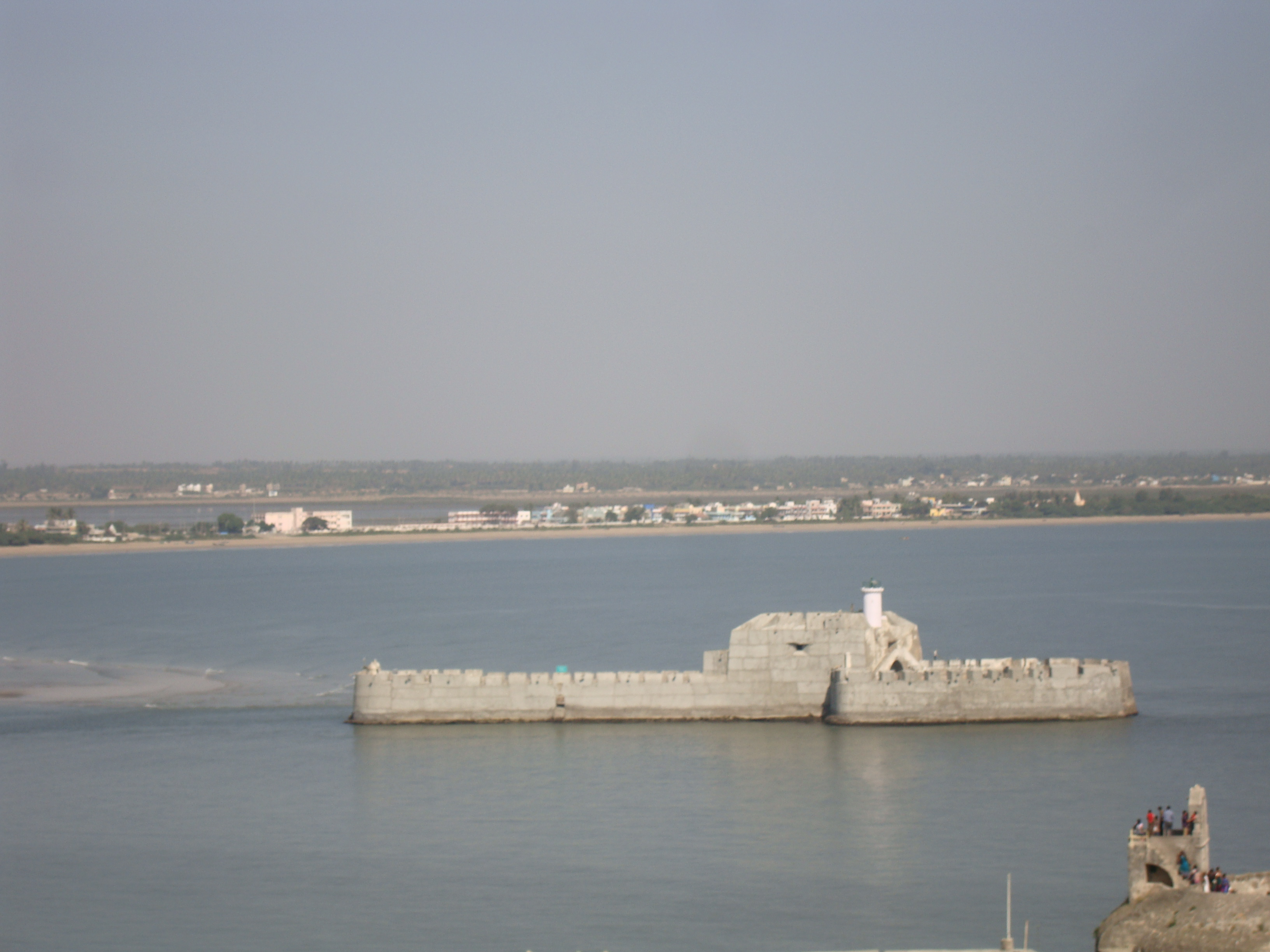
View of Water Fort Prison from Diu Fort with watchtower of Diu Fort

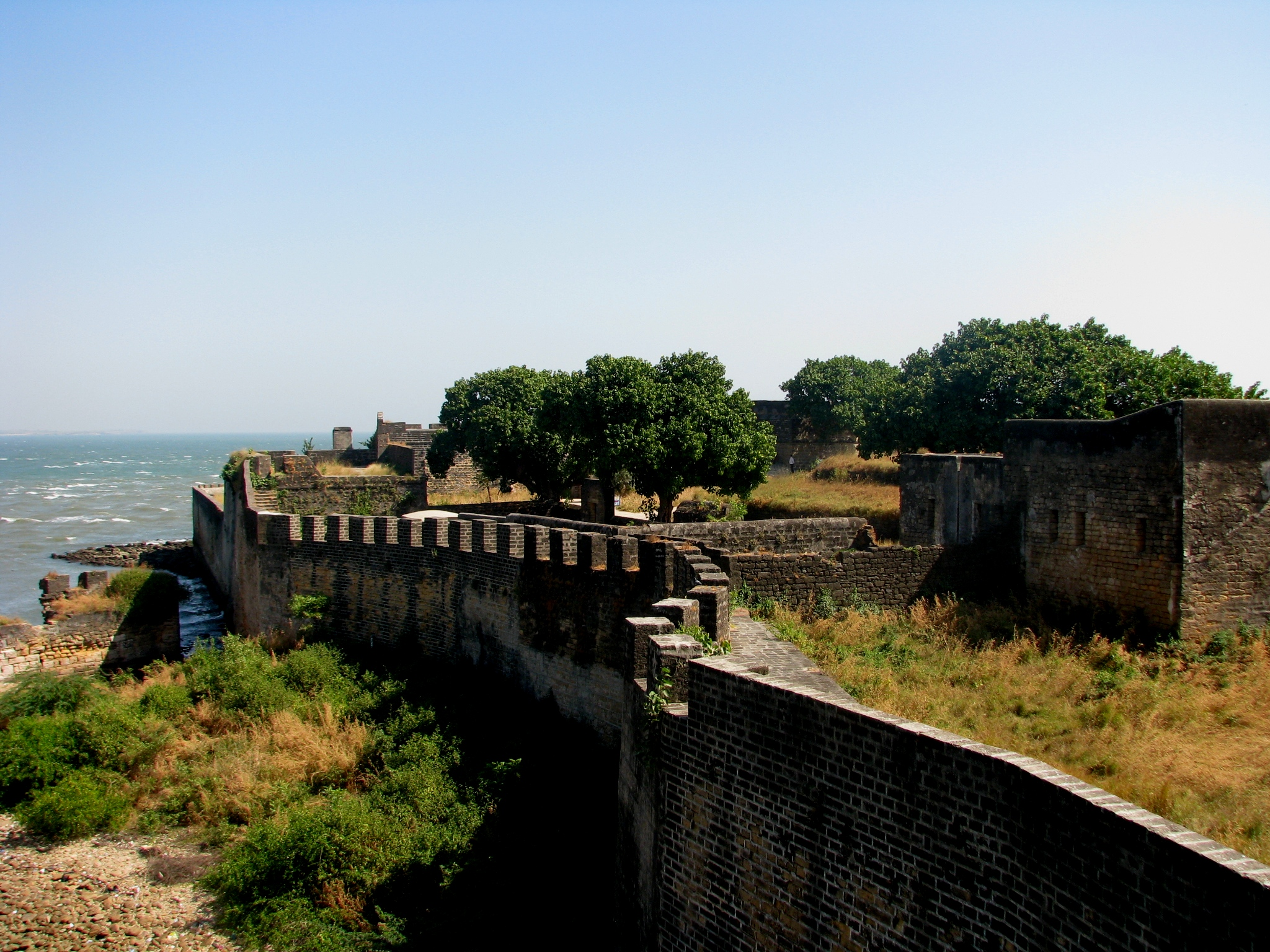
Portuguese Fort

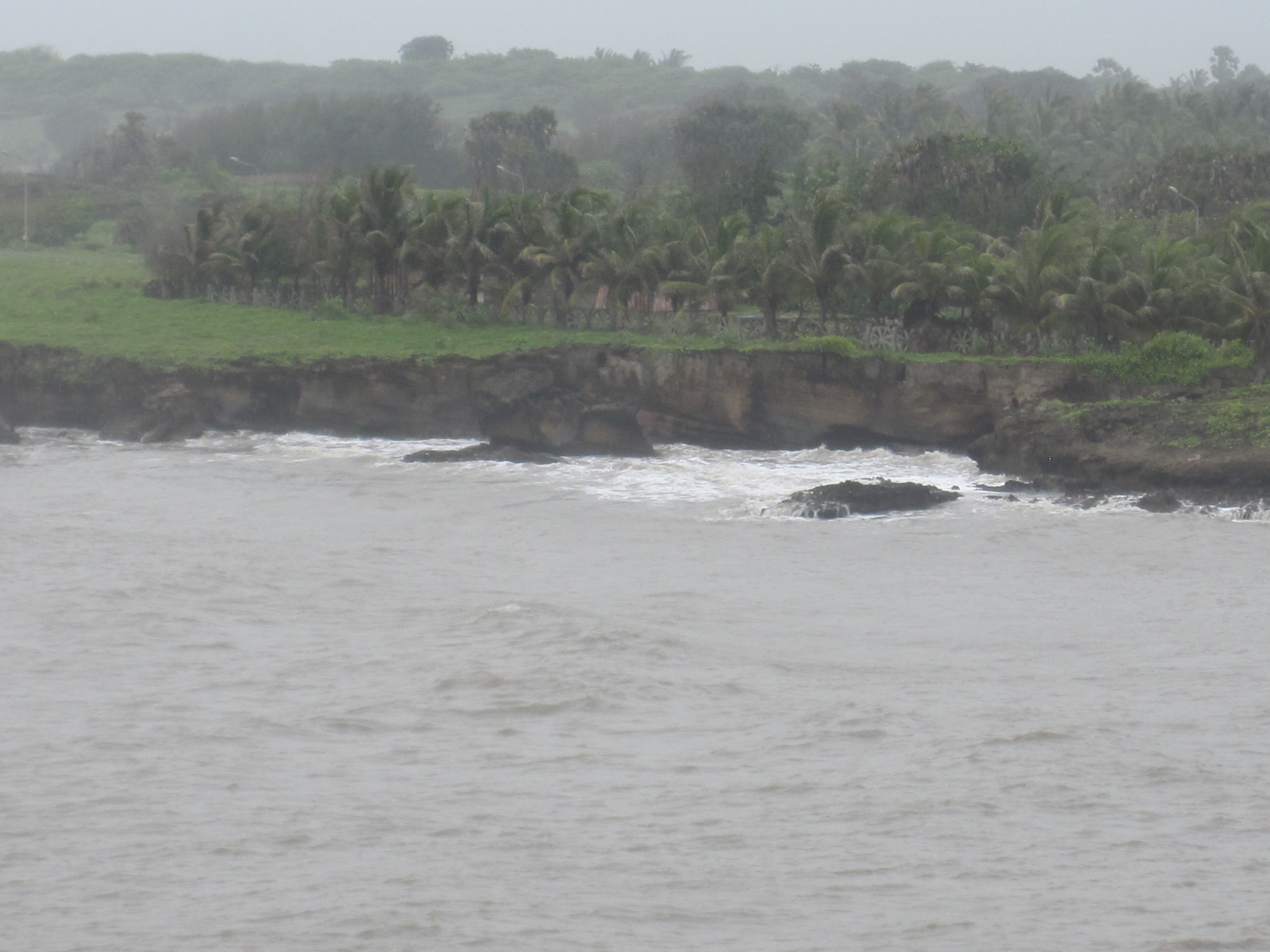
Diu shores in Monsoon

== See also ==
- Indo-Portuguese
- Portuguese Goa and Damaon
- Damaon and Dio Portuguese creole
