= Fort St. Anthony of Simbor =

Ruined island fort in India

- Portuguese: Forte de Santo António de Simbor
- Cove of Simbor, Diu, India
- The ruined Fort St. Anthony

Site information
- Owner: Dadra and Nagar Haveli and Daman and Diu
- Controlled by: Portugal (1722–1961); India (1961–)
- Condition: Ruin

Location
- Simbor India
- Coordinates: 20.763°N 71.1515°E

Site history
- Built: 1722
- Materials: Stone fort
- Demolished: no
- Events: Siege of Diu

Garrison information
- Occupants: abandoned

Fort St. Anthony of Simbor (Portuguese: Forte de Santo António de Simbor, Forte Simbor, Fortim-do-Mar (Fort of the Sea), Forte Pani Cola is a small ruined fort located on an islet at the mouth of Sahil River (called Vançoso by the Portuguese) in the bay of Simbor, about 25 km east of Diu in India. The fort was built in 1722 to suppress the predatory activities of pirates along the coast.

The island fort, along with two small plots of land on either side of the Vançoso River, was part of Simbor, a tiny Portuguese exclave of about 1 square km which was subordinate to the government of Diu. Along with Diu and the rest of Portuguese India, it was invaded and absorbed by India in December 1961.

Fort St. Anthony of Simbor is often confused with another fort with a similar name called Fortim do Mar, Diu.

The ruined fort has been earmarked for restoration by the authorities of Daman and Diu.

== History ==
Forte Santo António de Simbor, built at a time when the Portuguese presence in Asia was declining, is one of the last fortifications built in India by the Portuguese.

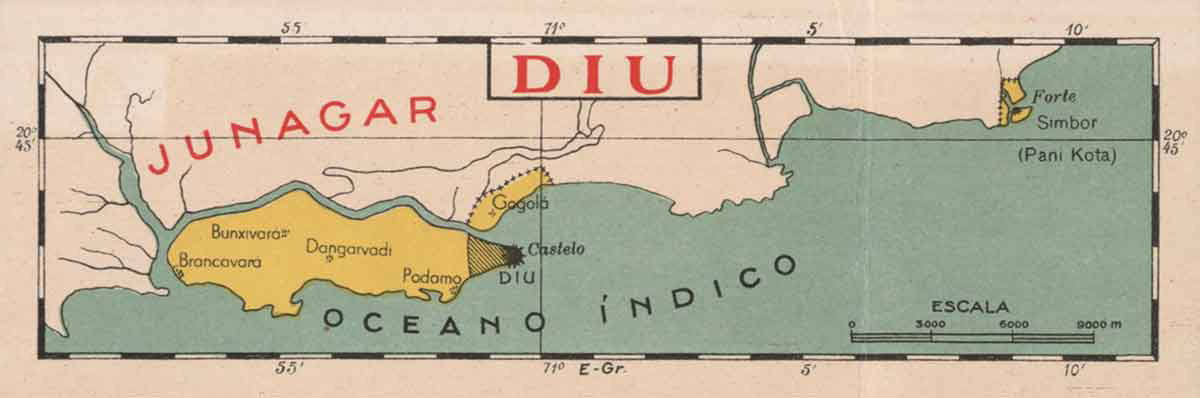
Portuguese map from 1934 showing Diu, with the enclave of Simbor

Its construction had been prompted by the predatory activities of Sanganian pirates along the northern shores of the Arabian Sea, especially in the Gulf of Cambay. In 1722, following the construction by the pirate leader Ramogi Varer of a small fortified position on an islet at the mouth of the Vançoso River in the bay of Sambor, where the pirates anchored their light vessels, the governor of Diu, Luís de Melo Pereira, ordered an assault against that position. After having captured it and burned the pirates' vessels, the Portuguese then decided to develop the existing installation into a defensive position which was renamed Forte Santo António de Simbor. A cistern was built since the supply of drinking water was a critical concern for the adequate defense of the position maintained by a garrison of 30 men. The village of Simbor, 2.4 km inland, was occupied in the hope that it would provide sufficient income for the upkeep of the fort. This was not to be the case and some years later, officials suggested as a cost-saving measure to demolish the fort and use the material to clog the mouth of Vançoso River to prevent its use by pirates. The demolition order was postponed twice before it was decided to keep and repair the fort. At an unknown date, a small chapel dedicated to St. Anthony of Padua was erected inside the island fortification. In 1780, nearly half of the garrison was killed during an attack by hostile regional forces. By then, the village of Simbor had been definitively lost following the consolidation of the state of the nawab of Junagar which bordered on Diu and Simbor.

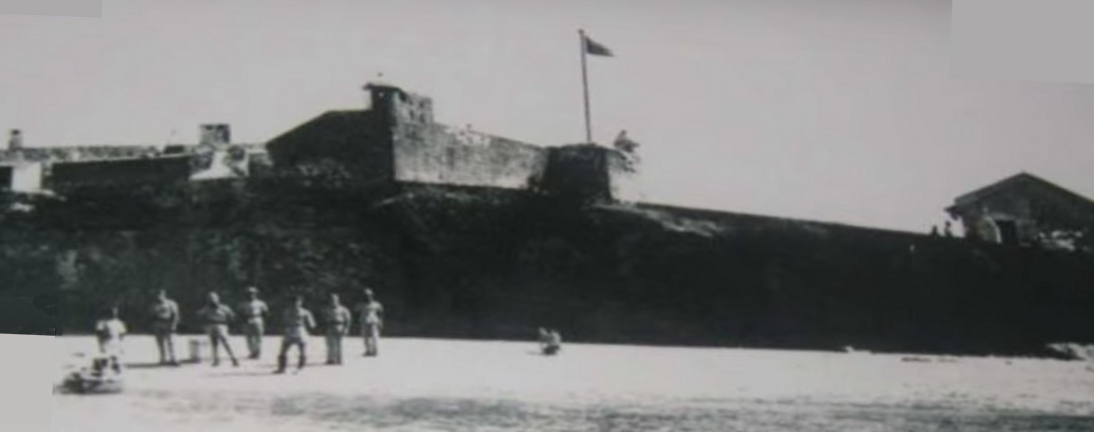
Soldiers from the garrison in front of the fort

A document from 1840 refers to the dilapidated state of Fort Santo António. In 1857, plans by the governor of Diu to restore the half-abandoned island fortress were opposed by Junagar, which also challenged Portuguese jurisdiction over areas on the mainland facing the island fort, including the water well of Dan-Kui from which the inhabitants of the nearby village of Simbor were barred. Due to constant jurisdiction conflicts with Junagar regarding among other things the limits of Diu, including the enclave of Simbor, negotiations were conducted between Portugal on one side and Junagar and the government of British India on the other. Following the signing of a treaty in 1859, Portuguese territory was reduced both at Gogolá near Diu and at Simbor, where Portuguese sovereignty was reduced to Fort Santo António and two small plots of land facing the fort on either side of Vançoso River. Portuguese troops, if disarmed, were authorized to cross the territory of Junagar when transiting between Diu and Fort Santo António.

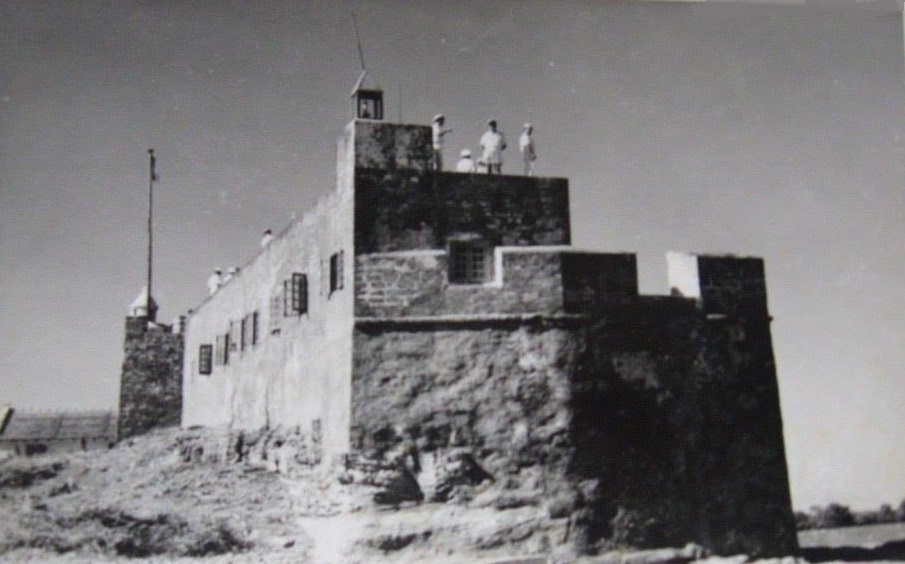
The fort c. 1950

The treaty of 1859 did not eliminate all sources of friction regarding Simbor, one being the smuggling of alcohol to avoid Junagar's abkari or taxes on liquor. A report from 1889 pointed out that, despite the near total abandonment of the fort, the activities of fishermen in the waters of the enclave contributed to the small economy of Diu, being the main supply of the dried fish eaten by the population during the monsoon. Nevertheless, Portuguese officials more than once suggested that the worthless enclave of Simbor along with its fort should be abandoned or exchanged. The governor of Diu who visited the enclave in 1924 lamented that Portuguese territory consisted only of three small sandy and arid plots of land enclaved in Junagar, adding that following the last cyclone the fort now lay half-ruined.

In 1954, in conjunction with similar events in the Daman enclaves of Dadra and Nagar Haveli, merger activists from India occupied Fort Santo António then withdrew after having hoisted the Indian flag. On 19 December 1961 the small garrison of the fort was the last military contingent to surrender in Portuguese India, through the intermediary of a Portuguese officer of Diu who had reached Fort Santo António on an Indian army vessel.

== Characteristics ==
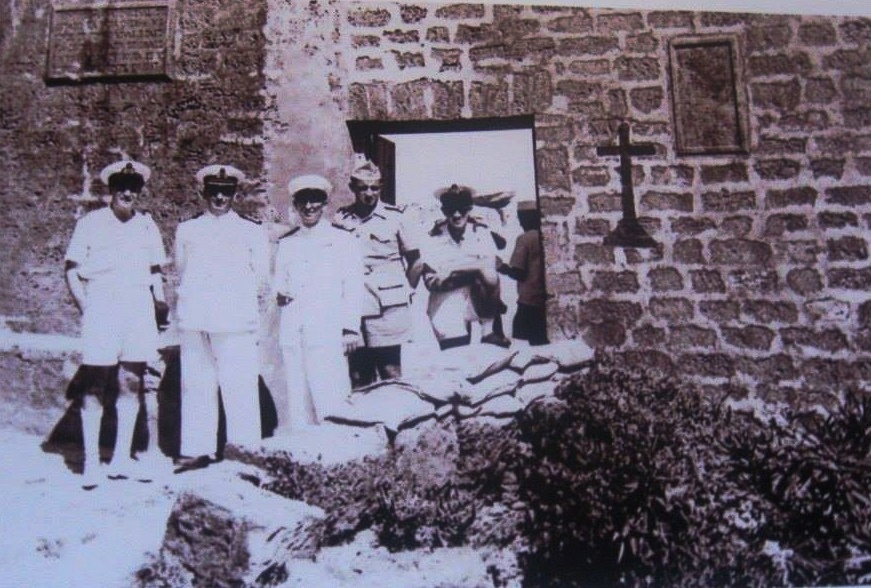
Portuguese officials at the entrance of the fort's chapel c. 1950

Built on a small island of nearly 1 hectare (2.4 acres), the fortified perimeter of Fort de Santo António occupied a rectangular area of approximately 420 m^{2}, with an additional area of 390 m^{2}, where the cistern and some exterior structures were located. A chapel was also built at an unknown date.

The fort was completely abandoned following the departure of the Portuguese in 1961 and the structure continued to deteriorate, with large sections of the stone wall eventually collapsing. In 2015, to keep out trespassers and prevent further erosion of the island which was threatening what was left of the fort, a high rectangular wall — crenelated to suggest a medieval origin — was hastily built around the perimeter of the fort.

== See also ==
- Simbor
- Diu
- List of Portuguese colonial forts
- List of forts in India

== Bibliography ==
- PEREIRA, A. B. de Bragança. Etnografia da Índia Portuguesa.
