= Gogolá =

Ghoghla Gogolá
- Village
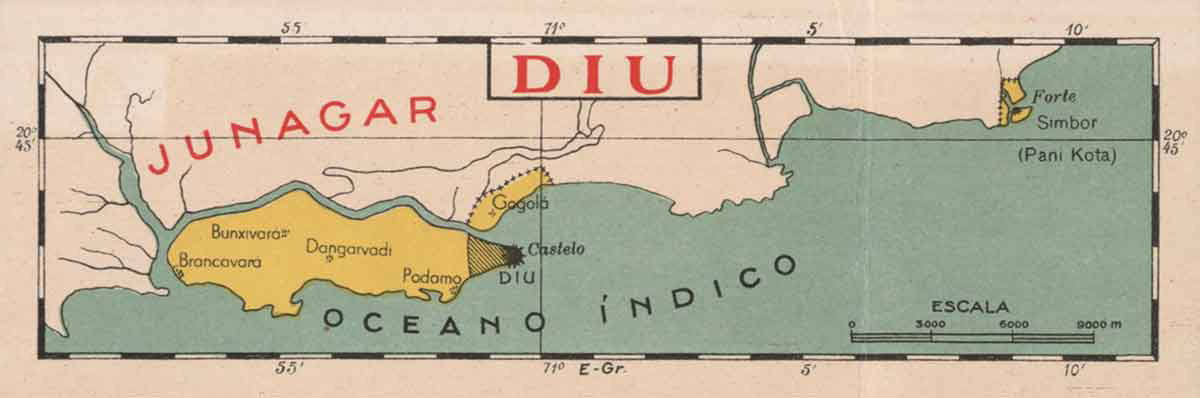
- Map of Diu showing Gogolá

- Location within India
- Coordinates: 20°43′37″N 70°59′18″E
- Country: India
- UT: DNDD
- District: Diu
- Sub-district: Diu Island
- Established: 1539

Government
  - Type: Panchayat

Area
  - Total: 1.14 km^{2} (0.44 sq mi)
- Elevation: 4 m (13 ft)

Population (2020)
  - Total: 1,751 (approx.)
  - Density: 1,540/km^{2} (3,980/sq mi)
- Demonym: Gogolacar

Languages
  - Official: English, Hindi
  - Spoken: Gujarati
  - Historical: Diu Indo-Portuguese

Religions
  - Dominant: Christianity, Hinduism
  - Historical: Roman Catholicism
- Time zone: UTC+5:30 (IST)

Gogolá or Ghogolá is a village within the Diu district, in the territory of the Union of DNDD, in India. It is a continental enclave located on the peninsula of the same name.
