= Diu =

Diu may refer to:

- Diu, India, a city in Diu district in the union territory of Dadra and Nagar Haveli and Daman and Diu, India
  - Diu district, part of the union territory of Dadra and Nagar Haveli and Daman and Diu
  - Diu Island, an island and part of Diu district
  - Daman and Diu (Lok Sabha constituency), parliamentary constituency in India
  - Daman and Diu, former union territory of India, now part of Dadra and Nagar Haveli and Daman and Diu
  - Goa, Daman and Diu, former union territory of India, divided into Goa and Daman and Diu
  - Diu Head, a headland in the Arabian Sea
- Diu (Cantonese), a Cantonese profanity
- Buth Diu (died 1972), Sudanese politician

DIU may refer to:

- Dansk Interlingua Union, an organization that promotes Interlingua in Denmark
- Defense Innovation Unit, a US Department of Defense organization
- Diplôme interuniversitaire, a French degree
- Diu Airport, in Diu, India, IATA code: DIU
- Divisional Intelligence Unit, police intelligence at the divisional level
- Down-with-Imperialism Union, a union formed by Kim Il-sung, president of North Korea
- Dresden International University, part of Dresden University in Germany
- Dubrovnik International University in Croatia
- Daffodil International University, a private research university located in Bangladesh

== See also ==
- Diao (刁), Chinese surname sometimes written as Diu in Cantonese
- Diou (disambiguation)
- Diu Diu Cave, in Papua New Guinea
- the military confrontation that took place at Diu, India:
  - Battle of Diu (1509)
  - Siege of Diu (1531)
  - Siege of Diu (1538)
  - Siege of Diu (1546)
