= Dio =

Dio may refer to:

== Given name ==
Dio or Dion, masculine given name

- Dio of Alexandria, Greek philosopher and ambassador (1st century BC)
- Dio Chrysostom, Roman philosopher (AD 40–120)
- Cassius Dio, Roman historian (AD 160–230)
- Cassius Dio (consul 291)
- Dio Lequaglie (born 1963), Italian beach volleyball player
- Dio Wang (born 1981), Chinese-born Australian politician

== Surname ==
- Ronnie James Dio (1942–2010), American heavy metal singer
- Johnny Dio (1914–1979), Italian American mobster

== Places ==
- Dio, Burkina Faso
- Diö, a small village in southern Sweden
- Dio-et-Valquières, France
- Dio-Gare, Mali
- Diu, India, formerly known as Dio

== Music ==
- Dio (band), an American heavy metal band
- Dio – Distraught Overlord, a Japanese heavy metal band
- "Dio" (song), a song by Tenacious D on the 2001 eponymous album
- Dio (album), an album by Jørn Lande
- "Dio", a song from the Throwing Muses album Red Heaven

== Abbreviations ==
- Days Inventory Outstanding
- Diocesan Boys' School, Hong Kong
- Diocesan Girls' School, Hong Kong
- St. John's Diocesan Girls' Higher Secondary School, India
- Diocesan School for Girls (Auckland), New Zealand
- Defence Intelligence Organisation, Australian military intelligence agency
- Defense Industries Organization, conglomerate of companies run by the Islamic Republic of Iran
- Defence Infrastructure Organisation, an operating arm of the UK Ministry of Defence
- Diet-induced obesity model (DIO model), an animal model used in laboratory research
- Digital Input/Output

== Other uses ==
- The Italian word for God
- Dio Brando, a fictional character and antagonist in JoJo's Bizarre Adventure, later known mononymously as DIO
- Honda Dio, motorscooter produced in India
- Radio Dio, an independent radio station, broadcasting to the French city of Saint-Etienne
- Dio Eraclea, character from the anime Last Exile as well as its sequel Last Exile: Fam, The Silver Wing

== See also ==
- Dion (disambiguation)
- Dios (disambiguation)
- D10 (disambiguation)
- Diou (disambiguation)
- Deo (disambiguation)
