= Dyos =

Dyos is an English surname. Notable people with this surname include:

- Harold James Dyos (1921–1978), British historian

== See also ==
- Dios (disambiguation)
- Dyo (disambiguation)
- Dyos is also the Filipino name for God
