= Dios =

Dios may refer to:

- Dios, Spanish for God
- Dios, an ancient Greek name, latinized Dius
- Dios, a character in the anime/manga series Revolutionary Girl Utena
- Desorption ionization on silicon, an ionization technique in mass spectrometry
- dios (malos), a rock band from Hawthorne, California, formerly known as "dios"
  - dios (album), an album release in 2004 by dios (Malos)
- Distal intestinal obstruction syndrome, an obstruction syndrome seen in cystic fibrosis
- DIOS, a roller coaster built by TOGO

== See also ==
- Dio (disambiguation)
