= Diu Island =

- Island
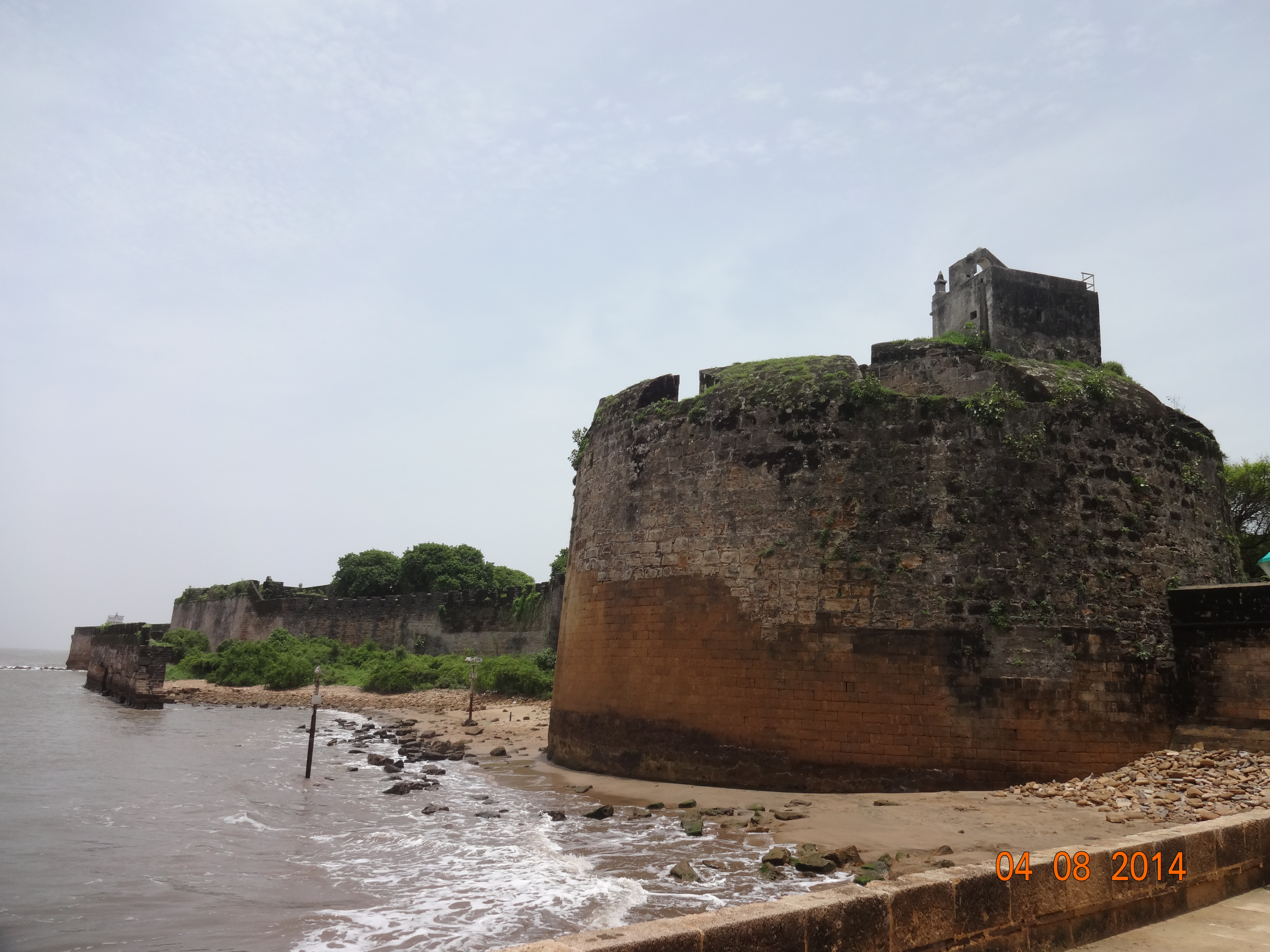
- Diu Fort

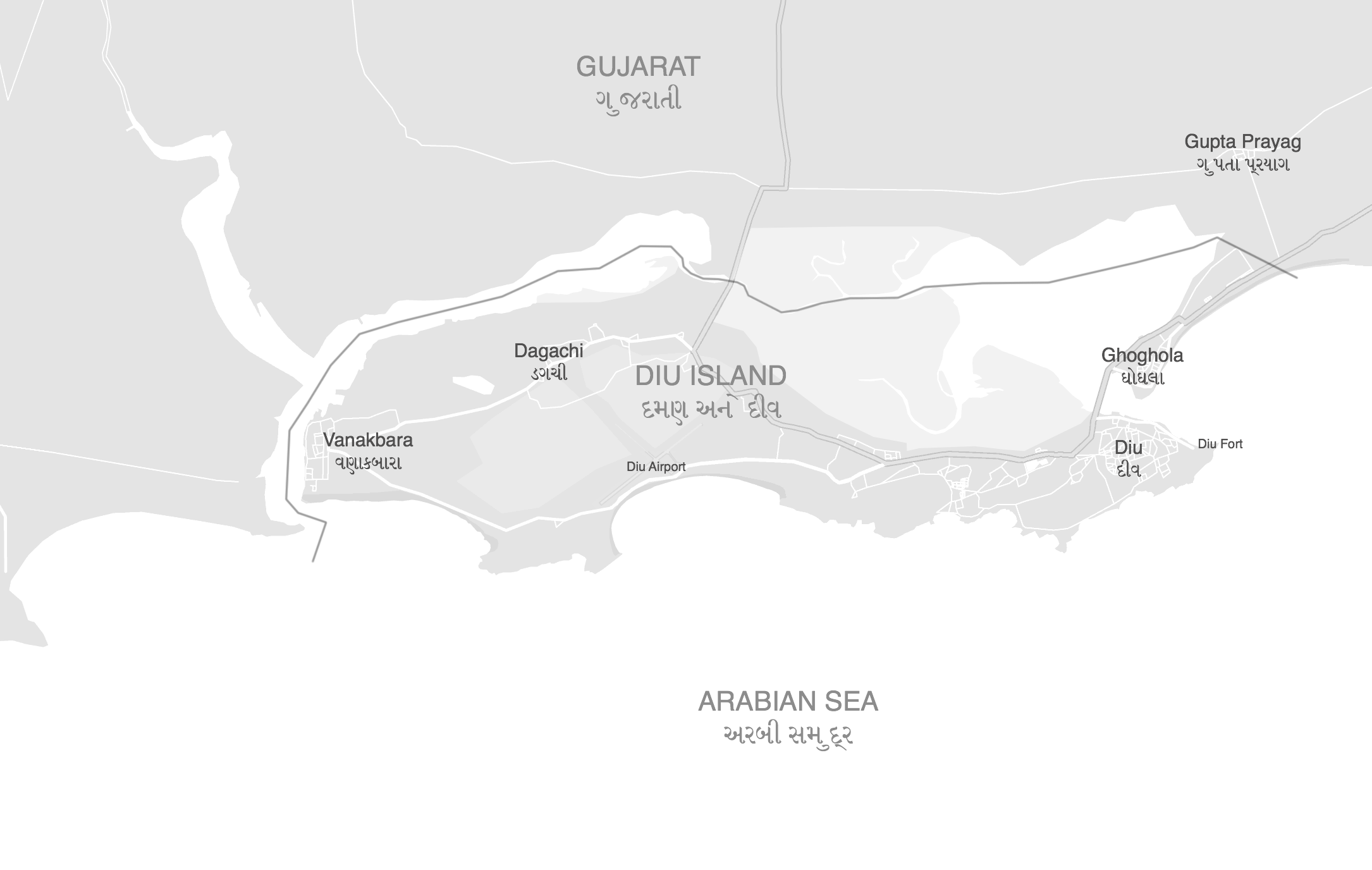
- Map of Diu Island showing major features

- Location within Gujarat
- Coordinates: 20°42′53.9″N 70°59′26.1″E
- Country: India
- Union Territory: Dadra and Nagar Haveli and Daman and Diu
- District: Diu

Government
  - Type: Panchayat

Area
  - Total: 38.8 km^{2} (15.0 sq mi)
- Elevation: 8 m (26 ft)

Population (2015)
  - Total: 44,215
  - Density: 1,140/km^{2} (2,950/sq mi)
- Time zone: UTC+5:00 (IST)
- Website: www.diu.gov.in

Diu Island is an island off the southern coast of Gujarat's Kathiawar peninsula, separated from the mainland by a tidal creek. It has an area of 38 km^{2}, and a population of 44,110 (2001 census, so not current numbers and most likely be much more today).

Administratively it belongs to the Diu district of the Dadra and Nagar Haveli and Daman and Diu union territory of India, both Daman and Diu share the same elected representative as the member of parliament. The island lies 5 km to the east of Diu Head.

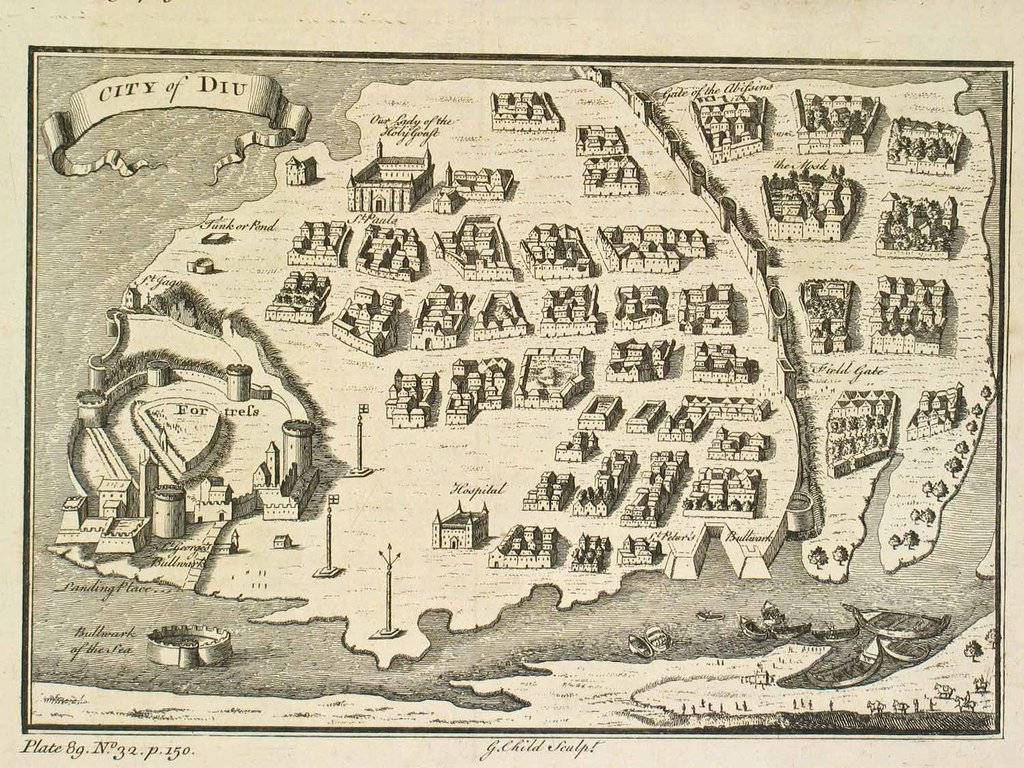
Map of Diu, 1729 (G. Child Sculpt., engraved by G. Child)

The town of Diu and Diu Fort are located on the island. There is also a domestic airport, Diu Airport.

== History ==
Throughout the 15th century, especially under Muzaffar Han, Diu flourished as a major port of the Gujarati state, with a notable fleet. From 1510, it became the seat of the governors of Surat. In 1535, the viceroy Nuno da Cunha made a treaty with Bahadur Sah, the sultan of Khambhat, for the use of the port by Portugal. Despite several attacks by Ottomans and Arabs, the Portuguese, who by 1541 had completed their massive fort, would remain in control of the island until 1961, when it became a union territory with Daman as part of the annexation by India.

The Ethiopian highlands, through the ports of Massawa and Zeila, imported Indian textiles and exported to the island slaves, wax, butter, civet and ivory. A population of Ethiopian slaves is reported in Portuguese sources to have lived in Diu and in the neighbouring area in the early 16th century.

== Churches ==
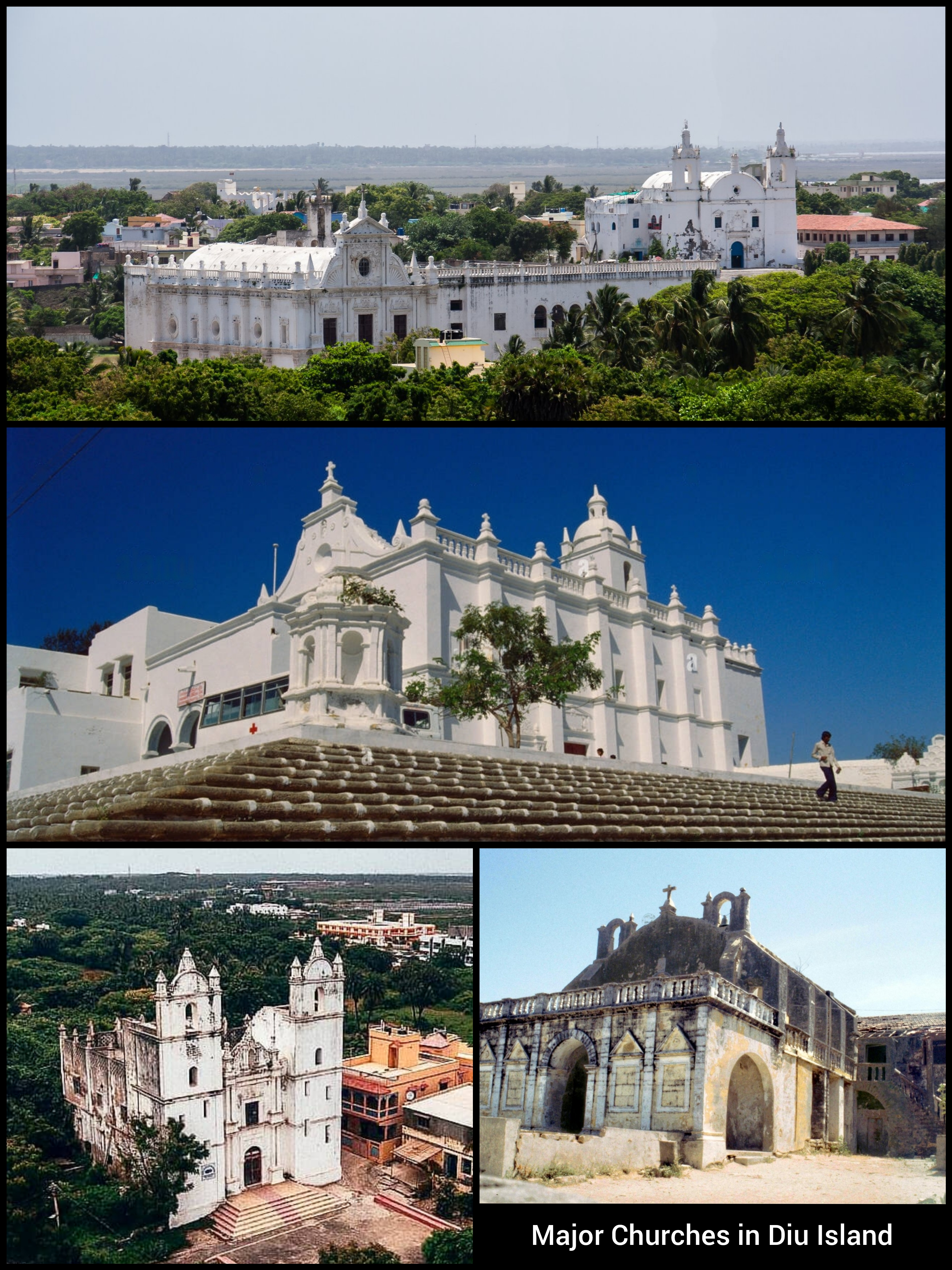
Major Church Buildings on Diu Island (Anticlockwise from top): 1. Churches of St. Paul and St. Thomas (Diu); 2. Church of St. Francis of Assisi (Diu); 3. Church of Our Lady of Remedes (Fudam); 4. Church of Our Lady of Mercy (Vanakbara)

=== St Paul's Church ===
The construction of this church was begun in 1601 and completed by 1610. The Church was dedicated to Our Lady of Immaculate Conception in 1691. Illuminated by flood lights (by night time), the main façade of the church is perhaps the most elaborate of all Portuguese churches in India. In architectural style, the church is Gothic and resembles the Bom Jesus Church at Old Goa. The wood panelling of the church is rated one of the best in church craftsmanship. The church is adorned with volutes, shell-like motifs and wood carvings.

=== St. Thomas Church ===
Now a museum, the old St. Thomas Church houses antique statues, various stone inscriptions of the earlier rulers, wooden carvings and idols. The Gothic edifice was built in 1598. A part of it has been converted into a museum. The artifacts displayed date back to the 16th century and beyond.

== Forts ==
=== Diu Fort ===
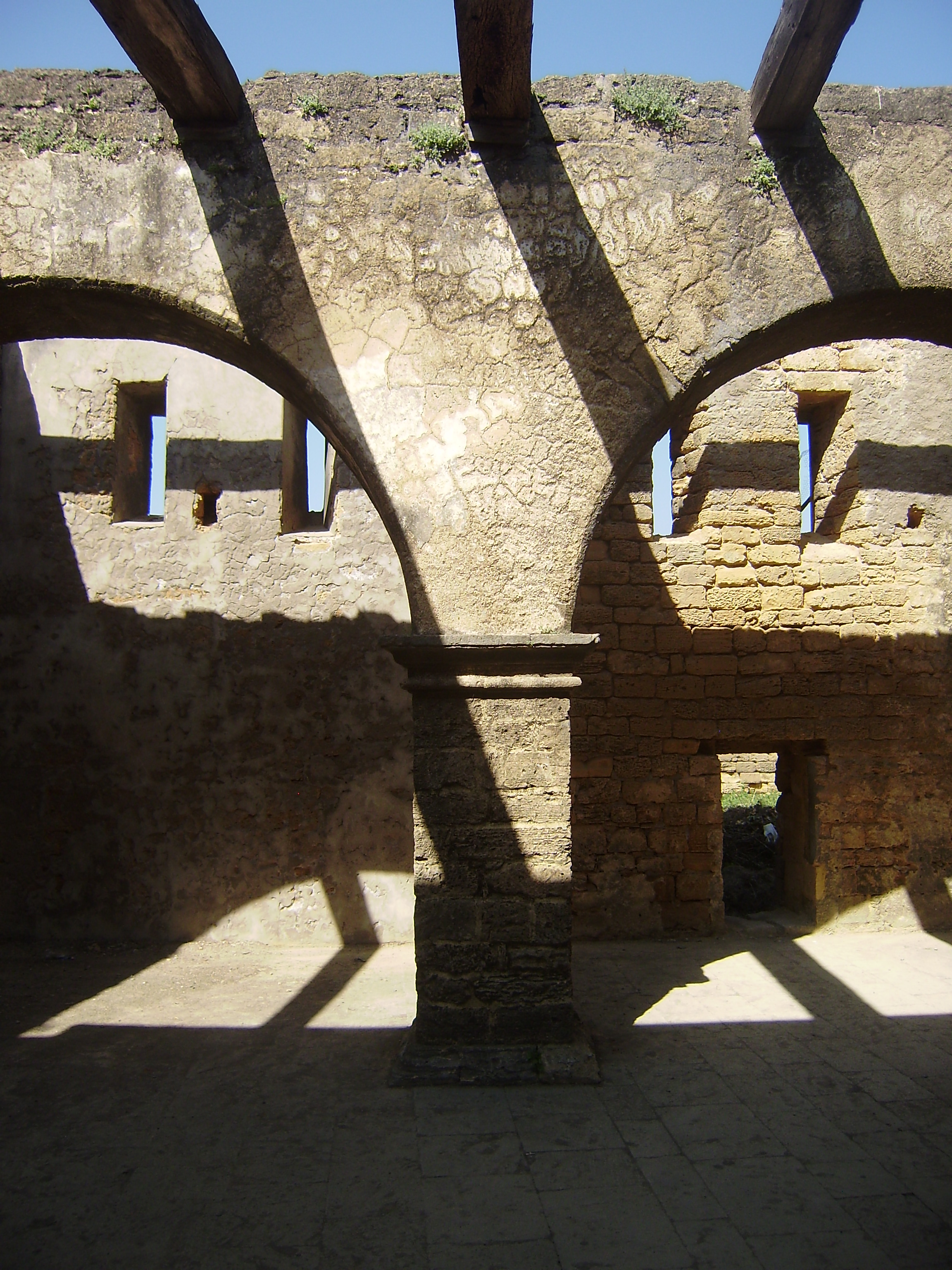
Diu Fort

The Diu Fort is administered by the Government of India. The fort was built by the Portuguese during their colonial rule of the Diu island. The town of Diu is located to the west of the fort. The fort was built in 1535, subsequent to a defense alliance forged by Bahadur Shah, the Sultan of Gujarat and the Portuguese when Humayun, the Mughal Emperor, waged war to annex this territory. Some additions were made in 1541 and the fort was strengthened over the years until 1546. The Portuguese ruled over this territory from 1537 until 1961. They were forced to leave in December 1961, during the Indian annexation of Goa, after which Diu became a centrally administered Union Territory.

The fort, with its double moat, is fairly well-preserved, but years of sea erosion and neglect are leading to its slow collapse. Cannonballs litter the place, and the ramparts have an array of cannons. The lighthouse is Diu's highest point, with a beam that reaches 32 km in every direction. There are several small chapels, one holding engraved tombstone fragments. Part of the fort also serves as the island's jail.

=== Fortim do Mar ===
Built right at the mouth of the creek, the fortress of Fortim do Mar (meaning Sea Fort in English or Pani-Kotha in Gujarati) is a stone structure in the sea. Approximately one nautical mile (1.852 km) from the Diu jetty, it also has a lighthouse and a small chapel dedicated to Our Lady of the Sea.

== Settlements ==
The town of Diu and most of the district's villages and settlements are on Diu Island. Many of these places have been renamed since the Invasion of 1961.

| Settlement type | Portuguese name | Indian name |
|---|---|---|
| Town | Diu | Diu |
| Village | Podamo | Fudam |
| Village | Bunxivará | Bucharwada |
| Settlement | Dangarvadi | Dangarwadi |
| Village | Brancavará | Vanakbara |
| Uninhabited | Fortim do Mar | Pani Kota |
| Uninhabited | Castilo de Diu | Diu Fortress |
