= Diocesan (disambiguation) =

Diocesan is derived from the words Diocese and Dio.

Diocesan may also refer to:

- St. John's Diocesan Girls' Higher Secondary School, India
- Diocesan Boys' School, Hong Kong
- Diocesan Girls' School, Hong Kong
- Diocesan School for Girls (Auckland), New Zealand
