= Dyo (disambiguation) =

Dyo or DYO can be:

- Dyo, commune in the Saône-et-Loire department in the region of Bourgogne in eastern France
- Dyo, an English singer
- Dyo Potamoi, a small village in the Nicosia District of Cyprus
- Ptisi Gia Dyo, album by Greek singer Mando
- Eimaste Dyo, Eimaste Treis, Eimaste Hilioi Dekatreis!, a song by Mikis Theodorakis
