= St. Paul's Church, Diu =

Coordinates: 20.7149°N 70.9906°E

St. Paul’s Church
- Igreja de São Paulo
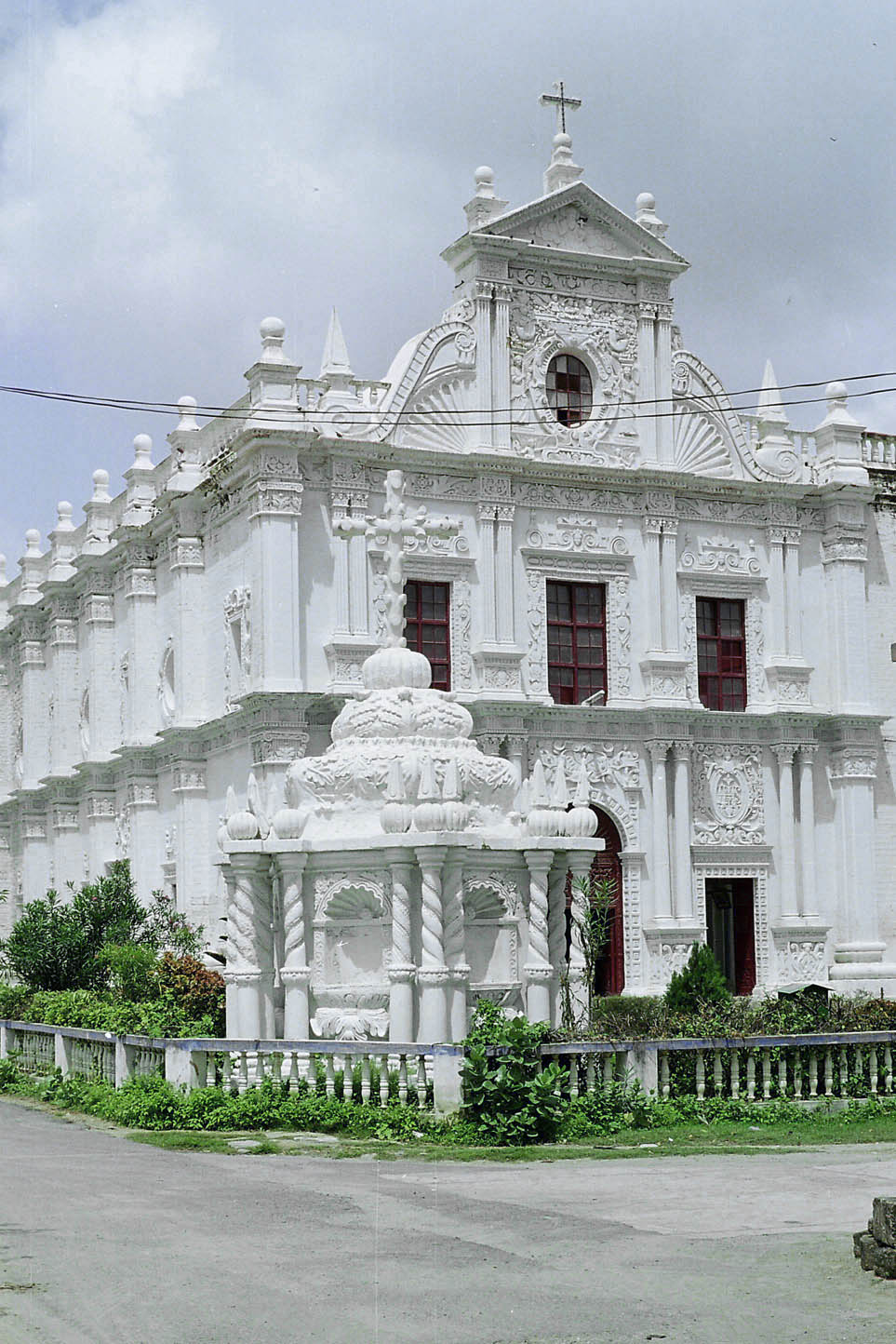
- Façade of the Church
- St. Paul’s Church
- Location: Diu
- Country: India
- Denomination: Jesuit

History
- Former name: Cathedral of Our Lady of Immaculate Conception
- Status: Active
- Founded: 1610; 416 years ago
- Founder: Portuguese
- Dedication: St. Paul; Our Lady of Immaculate Conception

Architecture
- Functional status: Church
- Style: Baroque

Specifications
- Capacity: 200 people
- Materials: Limestone

Administration
- Province: Goa and Daman
- Archdiocese: Goa and Daman
- Diocese: Daman
- Parish: Sé

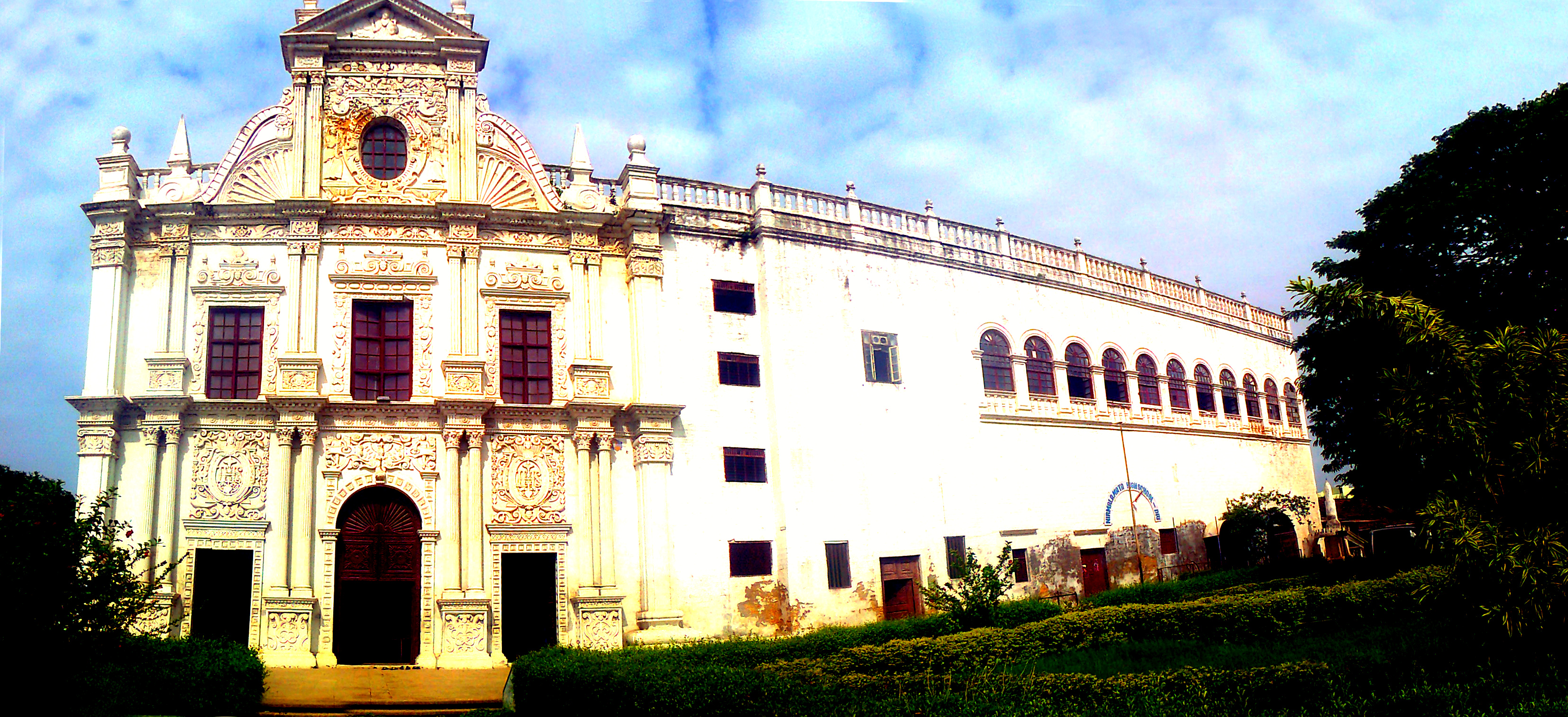
View of the church with adjoining monastery

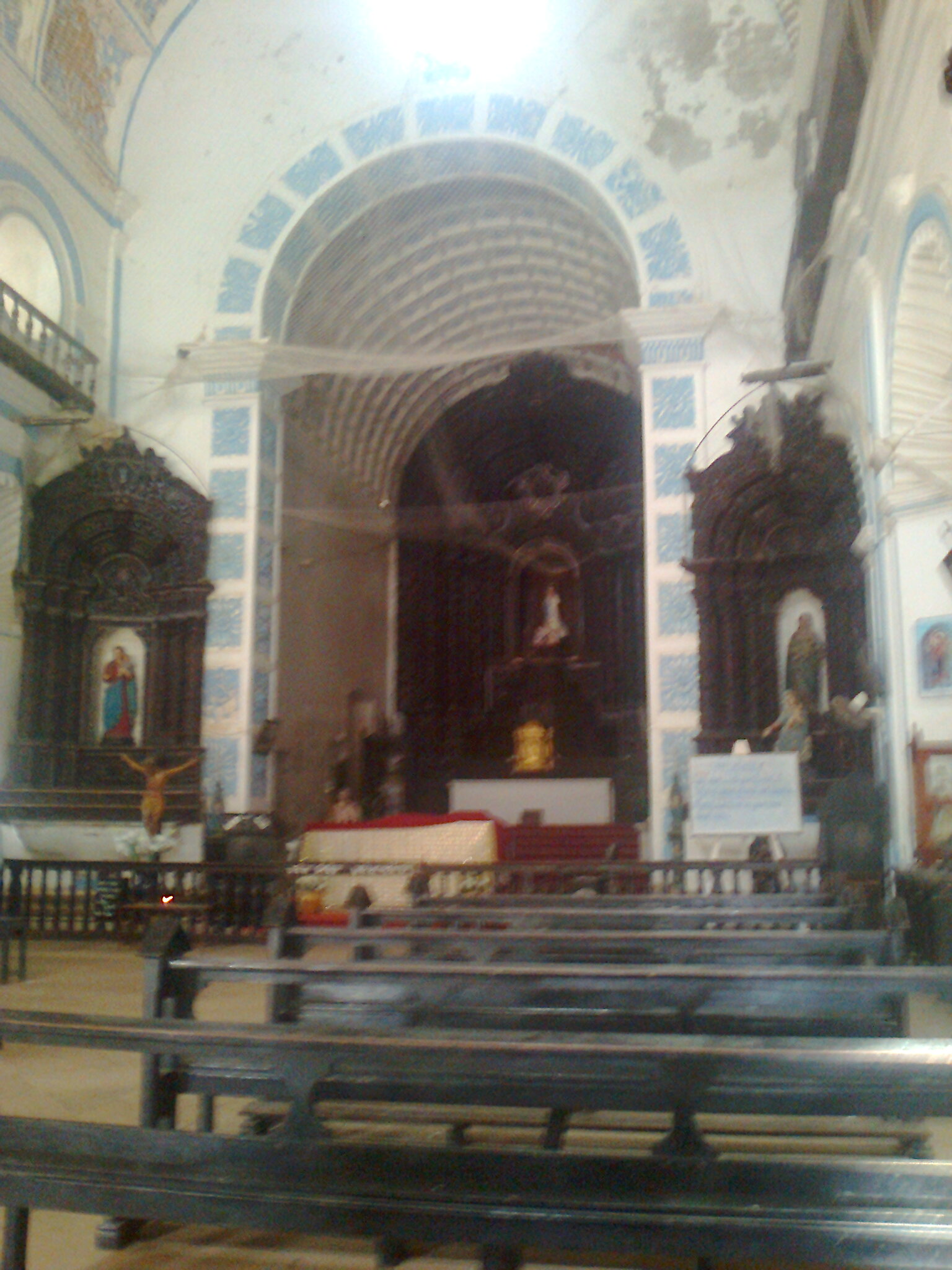
Interior view towards main altar

The St. Paul’s Church (Portuguese: Igreja de São Paulo) and officially College of the Holy Spirit and Church of Our Lady of the Conception or Saint Paul, is situated on Diu Island, on the west coast of India, a Union Territory of India. Diu came under the control of Portuguese colonists in early 16th century.

The St. Paul’s Church, named after St. Paul, the Apostle of Jesus also known as the Apostle to the Gentiles, is still a functioning church and one of the three churches in Diu built by the Portuguese. It is considered one of the best examples of baroque architecture (artistic style) in India.

== History ==
The church is located at the mouth of the Gulf of Cambay and its construction is dated to 1601 AD. Built in the style of a similar basilica church namely, the Bom Jesus Basilica at Goa, its construction was completed in 1610 AD and dedicated to Our Lady of Immaculate Conception.

== Architecture ==
The church, built in the Baroque architectural style, exhibits strong similarity but with better workmanship and design than the Bom Jesus Basilica at Goa built in 1605 AD, which was also built by the Portuguese during their colonial rule of the territory. The interior of the church is decorated with intricately carved woodwork that is considered one of the most elaborate in any Portuguese church in India. Its interior has elaborate and impressive design with delicate volutes (spiral scroll-like ornament) and shell. The front elevation or facade is also said to be the most detailed of all Portuguese churches built in India. The altar, which has the image of St. Mary, is carved out of a single piece of Burmese teak and is lined and lit up with 101 candles. Above the altar, there is a "blue-and–white barrel - vaulted nave adorned with priceless old paintings and statues.

=== Jesuit architecture ===
The Church is stated to be an innovative design of Jesuit architecture, typical to India. The unique aspect is the facade, which has intricate decoration vis-a-vis its plain walls. Although the frontal elevation of the church is a replica of the Bom Jesus Basilica, the church dispenses with an additional third storey and also the compartments created by the buttresses, as seen in the Bom Jesus Church.

The church has extravagant carved decorations in white stucco, mainly attributed to the craftsmanship of the Indian artisans, which is typical of most churches in Goa. It is inferred that the Indian silversmiths known for their exquisite workmanship have influenced the decor in the facade. This has been attributed to a fact that the Jesuits in India could not find native artists who could recreate the original Jesuit architectural designs. Hence, the religious images made in ivory and the objects made in silver have strong local flavour.

== Music ==
In Goan churches, which included churches in Diu, "lavish singing with many voices and sung masses were part of the elaborate ceremonies and processions that the Jesuits staged there". The two ceremonies that are held at the Diu church are the Feast of the Eleven Thousand Virgins to mark the commencement of the school year and the other is on 25 January to mark the conversion of St. Paul, which were largely attended when Portuguese ruled the area and also now.

== Congregation ==
It is the largest and the only functioning church in Diu catering to the small Christian community of about 450 Christians who remain after the Diu territory merged with India after the end of Portuguese colonial rule on 11 December 1961.

== Visitor information ==
The church is easily accessible from the main land from the village of Ghoghla in the east or from Veraval or Somnath in the west. It is well connected by roads with rest of the country. There are no railway lines within Diu but the nearest railway station is on the metre gauge line at Delvada 80 kilometres (50 mi) from the fort. Diu Airport provides regular air links to Mumbai. The church is located 844 kilometres (524 mi) north west of Mumbai by road. Diu is also approachable from Una, which is 10 kilometres (6.2 mi) from the Gujarat border.

== See also ==
- List of Jesuit sites
