= Diu Fortress =

Fort in India

- Part of Diu
- Diu, Dadra and Nagar Haveli and Daman and Diu, India
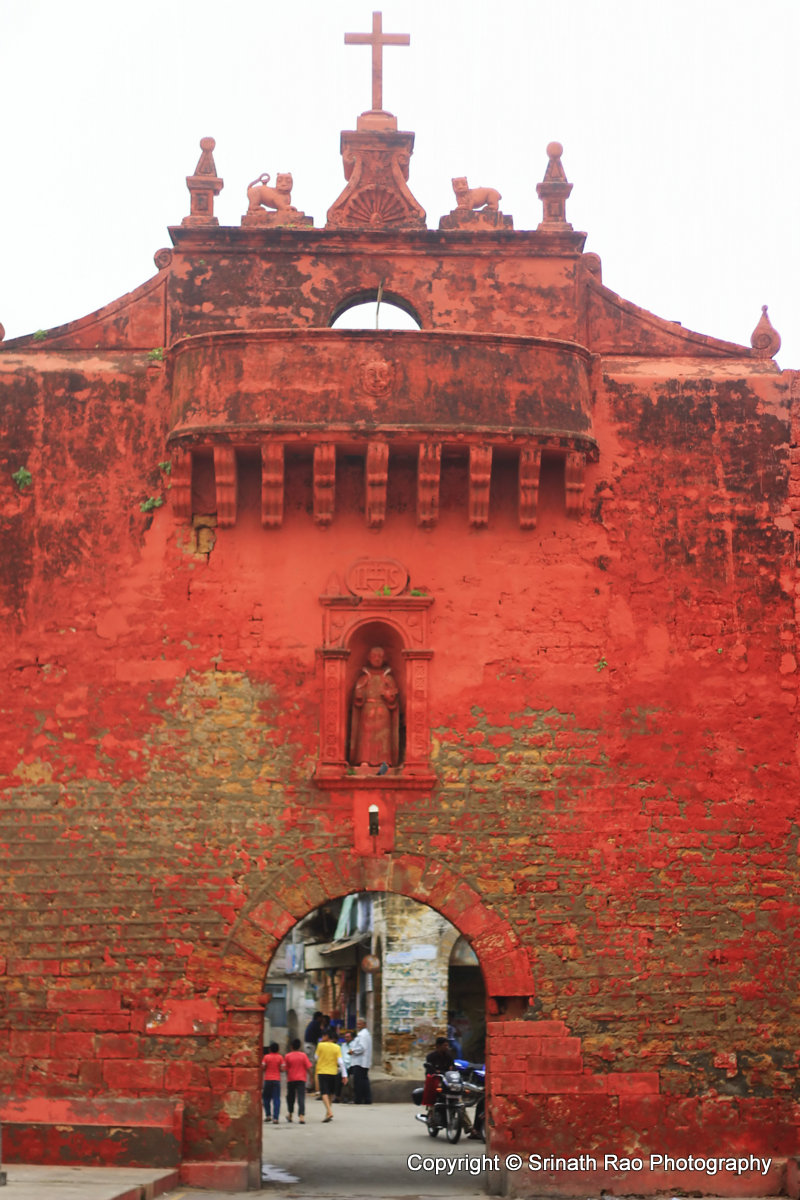
- Gate of the Diu Fortress

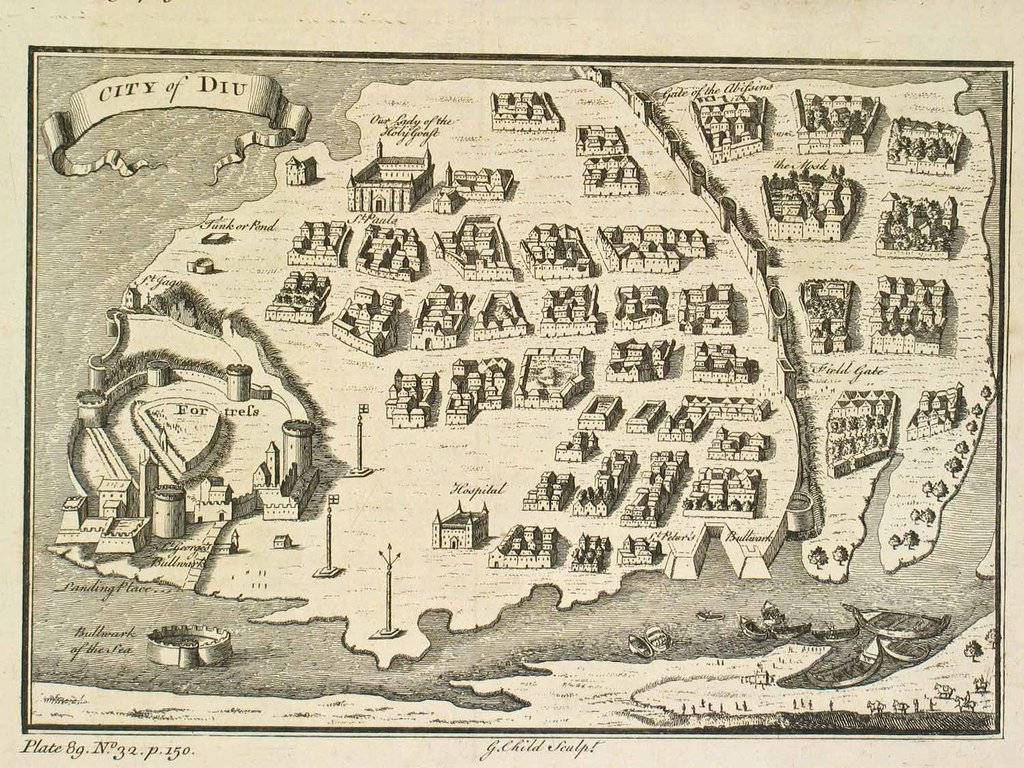
- Map of Diu, 1729 (G. Child Sculpt., engraved by G. Child)

Site information
- Type: Fort
- Owner: Government of India
- Controlled by: Portugal (16th century–1961); India (1961–present)
- Condition: Intact with partial ruins

Location
- Location within India
- Coordinates: 20.714°N 70.996°E

Site history
- Built: 16th century
- Built by: Portuguese Empire
- Materials: Sandstone and lime mortar

The Diu Fortress (Portuguese: Fortaleza de Diu or formally Fortaleza de São Tomé) is a Portuguese-built fortification located on the west coast of India in Diu. The fortress was built as part of Portuguese India's defensive fortifications at the eastern tip of the island of Diu during the 16th century. The fortress, which borders on the town of Diu, was built in 1535 subsequent to a defense alliance forged by Bahadur Shah, the Sultan of Gujarat and the Portuguese when Humayun, the Mughal Emperor attempted to annex this territory. It was strengthened over the years, till 1546. The Portuguese ruled over this territory from 1537 until the Indian invasion of December 1961. Today it is a landmark of Diu and one of the Seven Wonders of Portuguese Origin in the World.

== History ==
Before the Portuguese built the fortress in 1535, the ancient history of the place was linked to several kings and dynasties. The island was occupied by the Chavda Rajputs in the 9th century, and later by the Vaghela dynasty. The island would later come under the control of the Gujarat Sultanate.

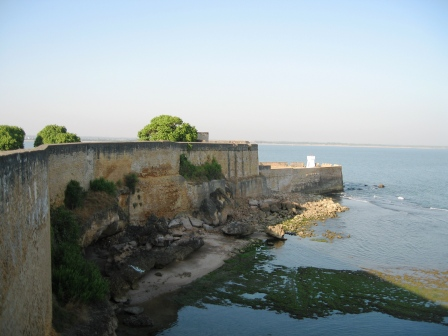
Full view of Diu Fortress towards the sea

Sultan Bahadur Shah of Gujarat sought the help of the Portuguese when Mughal Emperor Humayun was getting ready to attack Gujarat and annex Sultan's territory. The Portuguese thus got the right opportunity, which they were seeking for long, to get a foothold on the Diu island to build a fort for the protection of their trade. In the past, in 1501, 1521 and 1531 they had made attempts to seize the island by force but had failed. In 1531, Nuno da Cunha (1487 – 5 March 1539) who was the governor of Portuguese possessions in India from 1528 to 1538, was under orders from the King of Portugal to build a fort at Diu to strengthen its flourishing spice trade. He launched a strong military attack to annex Diu from the Sultan, with 100 vessels and 8000 men, including 3000 Portuguese. But this campaign could only achieve bombing of Diu without getting any foothold on the island. Portuguese forces could at best torment the nearby coast. They attacked again in 1532 and 1533 but without success. But an opportunity finally knocked on their door in 1535, when the Sultan sought their help to defend against Humayun's forces. Taking full advantage of this situation, the Portuguese diplomatically signed a defense treaty (Treaty of Bassein (1534)) with the Sultan in 1535 under which they got permission to build a fort and also to position a garrison in the fort. In addition, it formalized full control of the Bassein island (the island which they had already bought from the Sultan during an earlier skirmish in 1533 and built a fort there). The Portuguese not only built a large fort at Diu by demolishing old fortifications that were existing on the island but continued to make it a formidable fortress by constantly strengthening it during the period from 1535 till 1546.

After the Portuguese ambition to build a fort at Diu was met, there was total mistrust between the Sultan and the Portuguese on several issues. In 1537, in Diu harbor, the Sultan was killed in a fracas with the Portuguese. This resulted in a fight for the throne of the Sultanate of Gujarat by two claimants, but Governor Cunha's candidate lost. This put the Portuguese in a spot vis-a-vis the throne and they quickly repaired the damage by entering into a truce with the new Sultan, which was only a temporary reprieve.

=== Siege of Diu (1538) ===
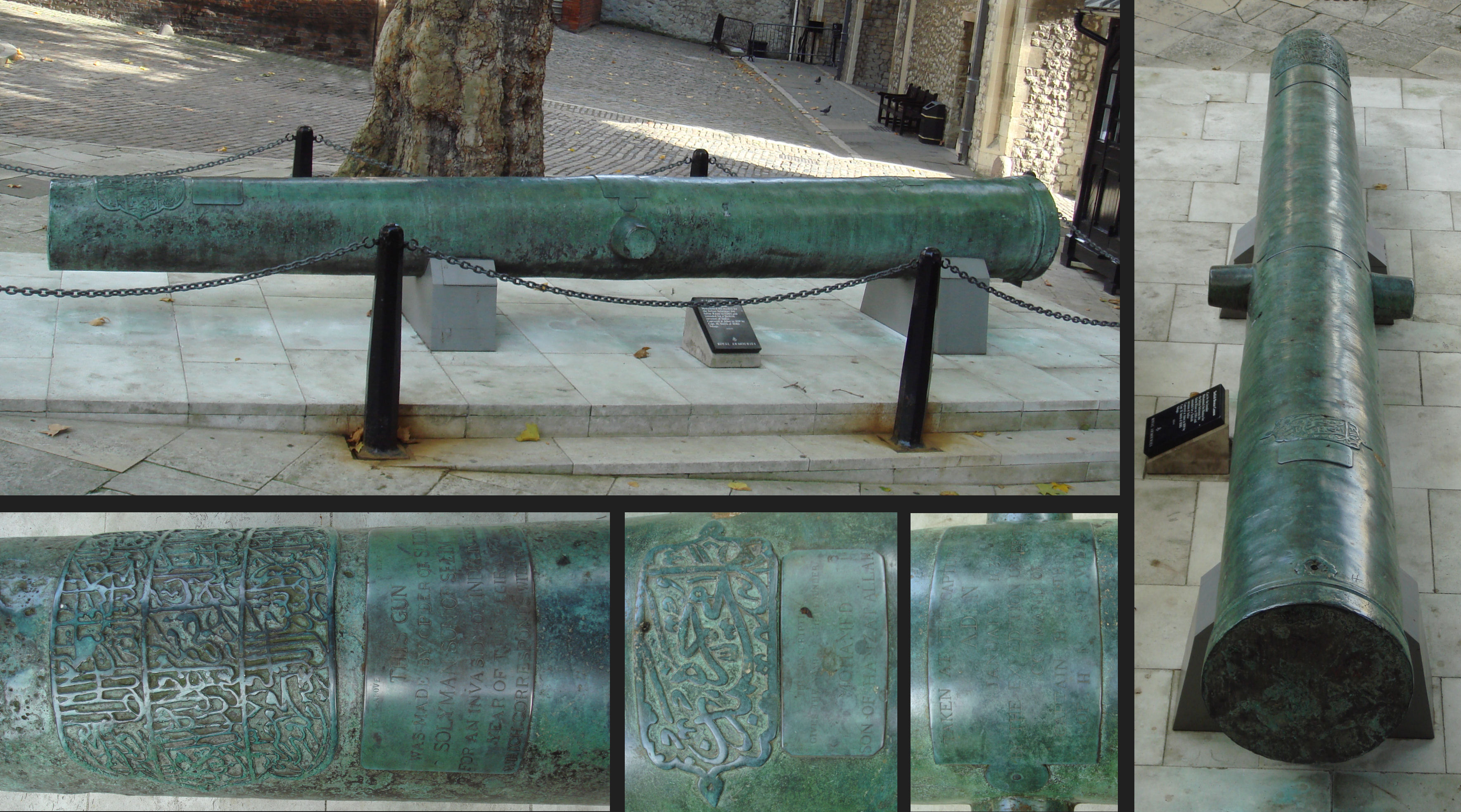
Ottoman cannon cast for the invasion of India. Taken in the capture of Aden in 1839 by Cap. H.Smith of HMS Volage. Tower of London.

In 1538, the Turks, who were ill-disposed towards the Sultan of Gujarat and the Portuguese, mobilized a strong naval force comprising sixty-six ships and 20,000 soldiers. Starting from Egypt in 1538 they laid siege to the fort, repeatedly assaulted and intensely bombarding it. When the fort's forces were about to collapse, the Turks, after seeing a fleet of 24 small galleys arriving in a supply run and believing it to be the vanguard of a bigger Portuguese rescue fleet, quickly lifted the siege and turned back to the Red Sea, leaving 1,200 dead and 500 wounded behind. Only 40 out of 400 men in the fort's Portuguese garrison had survived. This ended Turkish attacks on Portuguese India. In June 1538, the Sultan also attacked Diu, since during the previous year the Portuguese had occupied the fort as well as the city.

=== Later history ===
The rulers of Gujarat (Mahmud III, nephew of Bahadur Shah) also tried to take control of the fort in 1545 and 1546. However, they were repeatedly thwarted by the Portuguese under the military leadership of Dom João Mascarenhas and Dom João de Castro. After this, the Portuguese enjoyed uninterrupted control over the fort and Diu island, along with Daman and Goa.

In 1670 an armed group of bandits from Muscat pillaged the fort and the town.

In 1960, there were only 350 Portuguese soldiers garrisoned in the fort. "Operation Vijay" was launched by India on 19 December 1961 to end Portuguese rule in Goa, Daman and Diu. After Diu had fallen, the Martyrs Memorial was erected close to the Collectorate office in Diu to commemorate the Indian soldiers who were killed in the capture of Diu.

== Geography ==
The fortress-castle, known in Portuguese as 'Praça de Diu', is set within the Diu island, on the southern tip of the coast of Gujarat at the mouth of the Gulf of Cambay (also known as Gulf of Khambat). The fort and the town are delimited on the east by the state of Gujarat, on the west by the Arabian Sea, on the north by the Kolak River and on the south by Kalai river. It borders the town of Valsad and Junagarh district of Gujarat. Two bridges provide the connecting links to the town and fort. The secured fort provided sea access for trade and traffic with Cambay, Broach (now known as Bharuch) and Surat in Gujarat.

== Structure ==
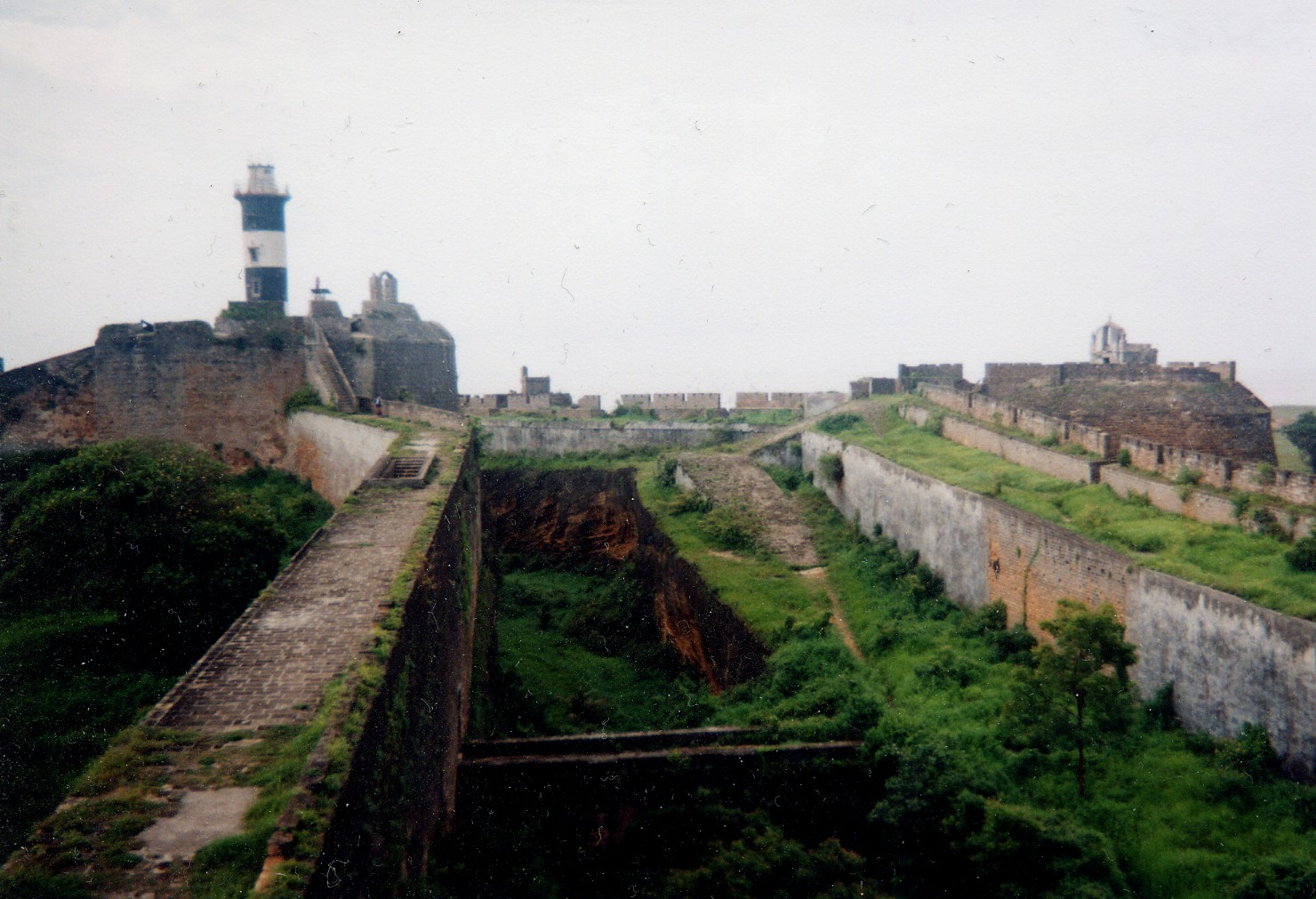
Diu, inside the fortress – Light house and the moat

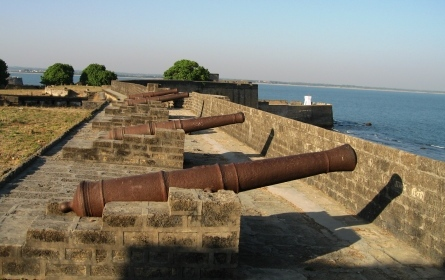
Cannons made of brass on the fort wall

Construction of the fort was started in October and completed in March, with the Portuguese forced labour putting their full might.

The fortress is a large structure on the coast of the Diu island and commands views over the sea. It skirts the sea on three sides. The outer wall of the fort was built along the coastline. The inner wall had bastions on which guns were mounted. A double moat (outer one is a tidal moat) between the outer and inner walls provided security to the fort. The moat that separates the fortifications from the castle has been cut through sandstone rocks. A jetty built then on the northwestern side is still in use. The fort was provided with three entry gates. A bastion built earlier by the Sultan in the deep water channel, next to the fort walls, was further strengthened by the Portuguese.

In the main entry gate, there are five large windows with stone galleries on the main front wall. From the fortress, a glittering view of the Panikotha fort located in the sea, off the coast opposite to Diu Fort, could be seen in the evenings. There are several cannons (some of them made of bronze appear well preserved) still seen at the top of the Diu fort. Also seen are collection of iron shells scattered around in the fort area. The fort is approached from a permanent bridge. The entrance gateway to the fort has an inscription in Portuguese. The bastion at the gate is named St. George.

A large light house is also located at one end of the fortress. Even now the ruins of the walls, gateways, arches, ramps, bastions of the fort provide an impressive view of the extent of military defenses that the fort provided in the past. Within the fort, well laid out gardens have paths bordered by old cannons.

== Gallery ==
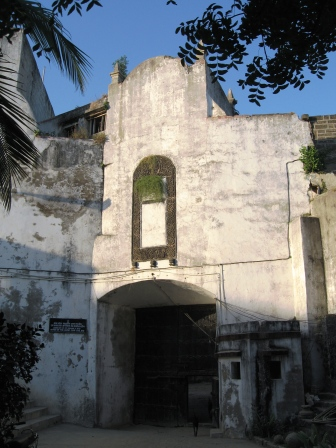
Barbican

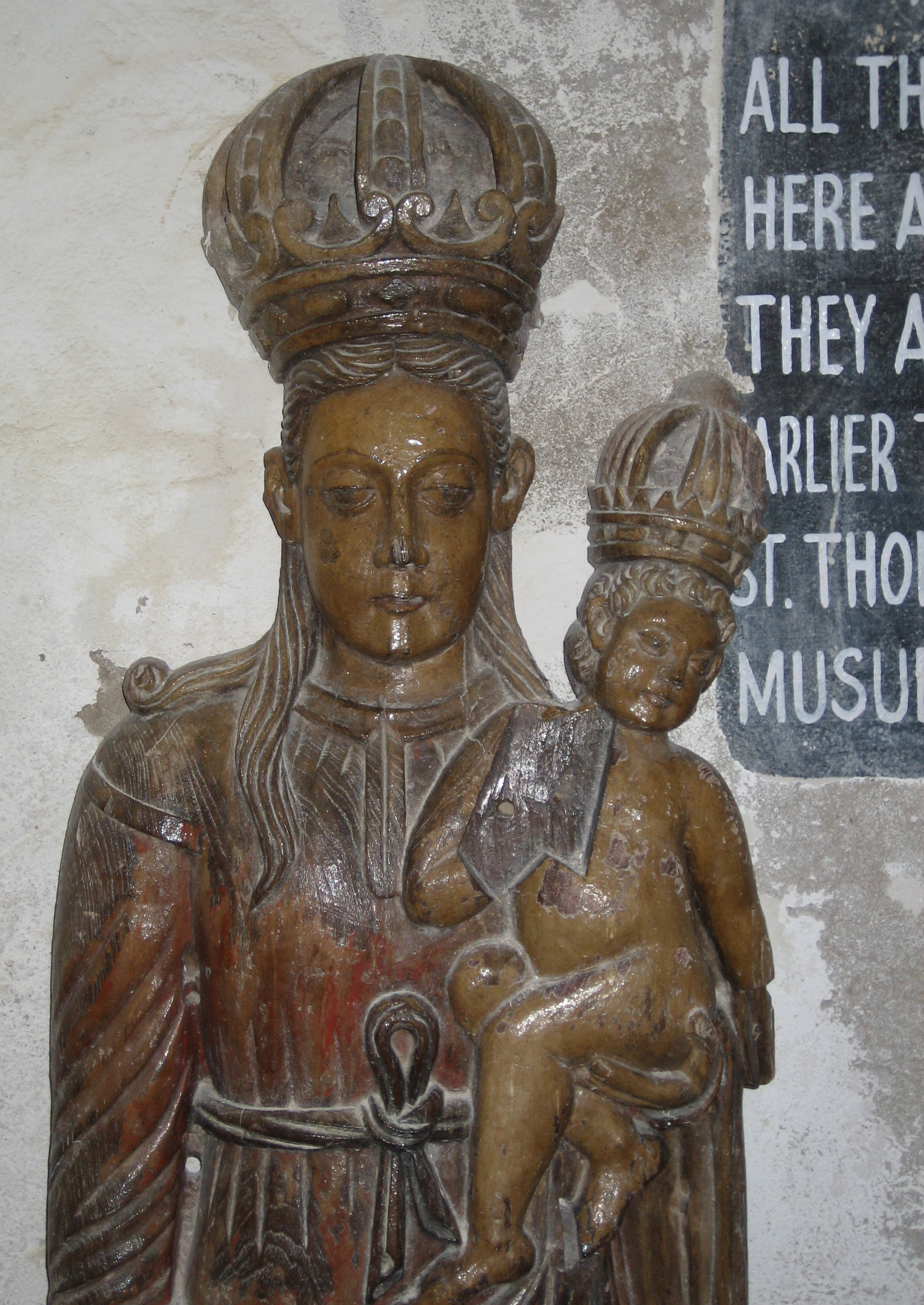
Portuguese relic made of petrified wood in Diu Museum

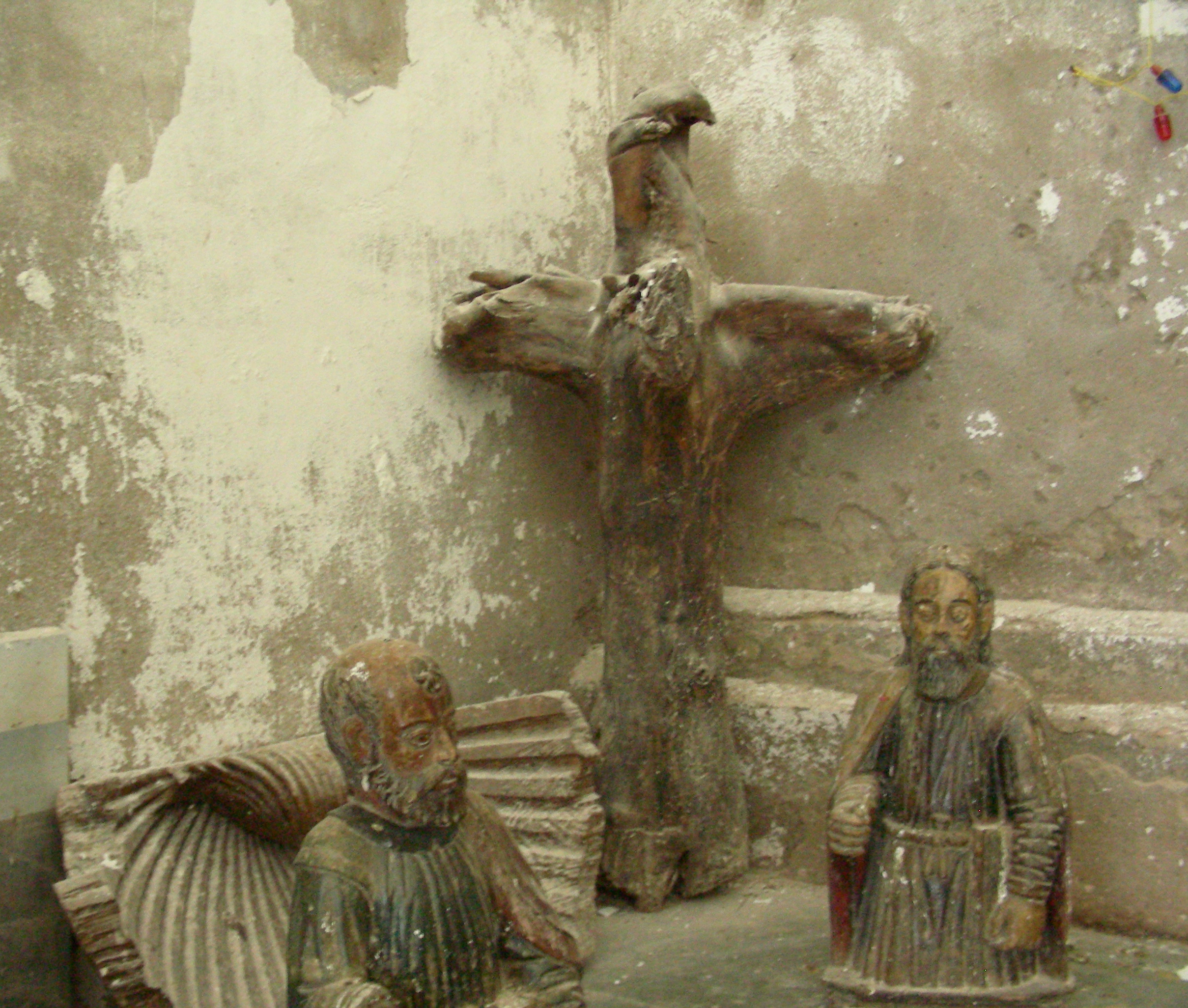
Diu relics made of petrified wood in Diu Museum

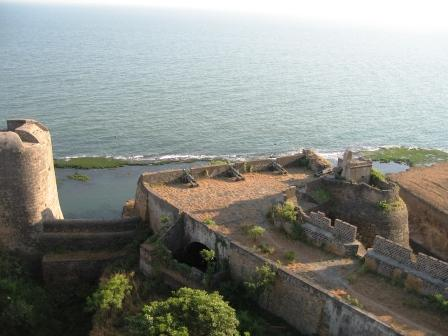
Looking out into the sea from Fort ramparts

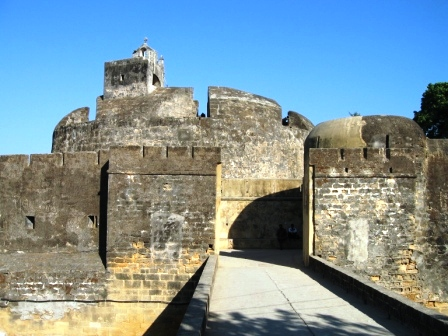
Entry ramparts to the fort

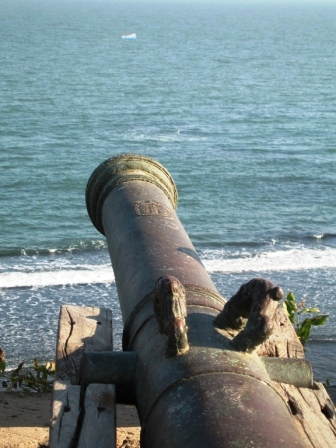
Gun position

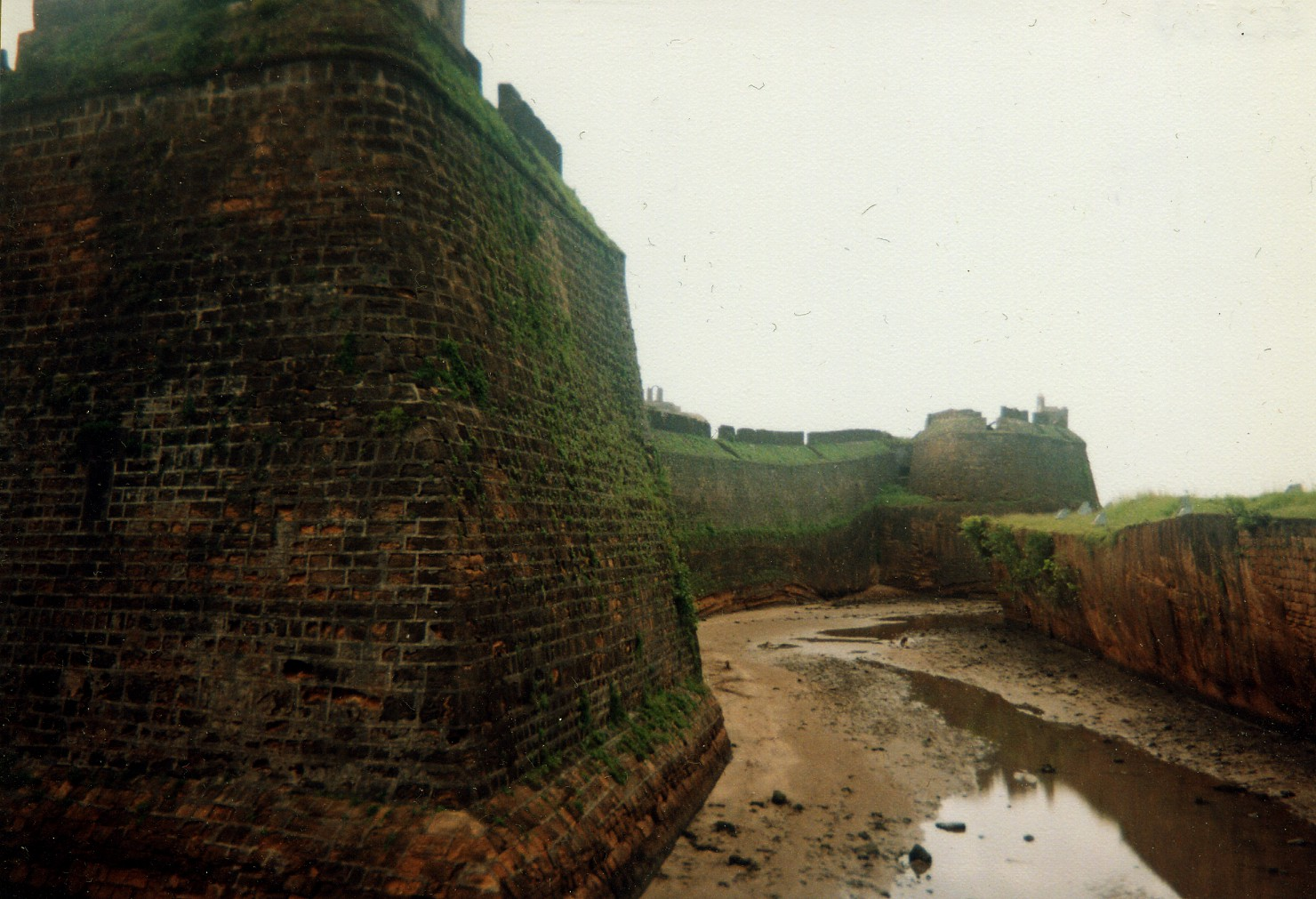
Diu fort's wall

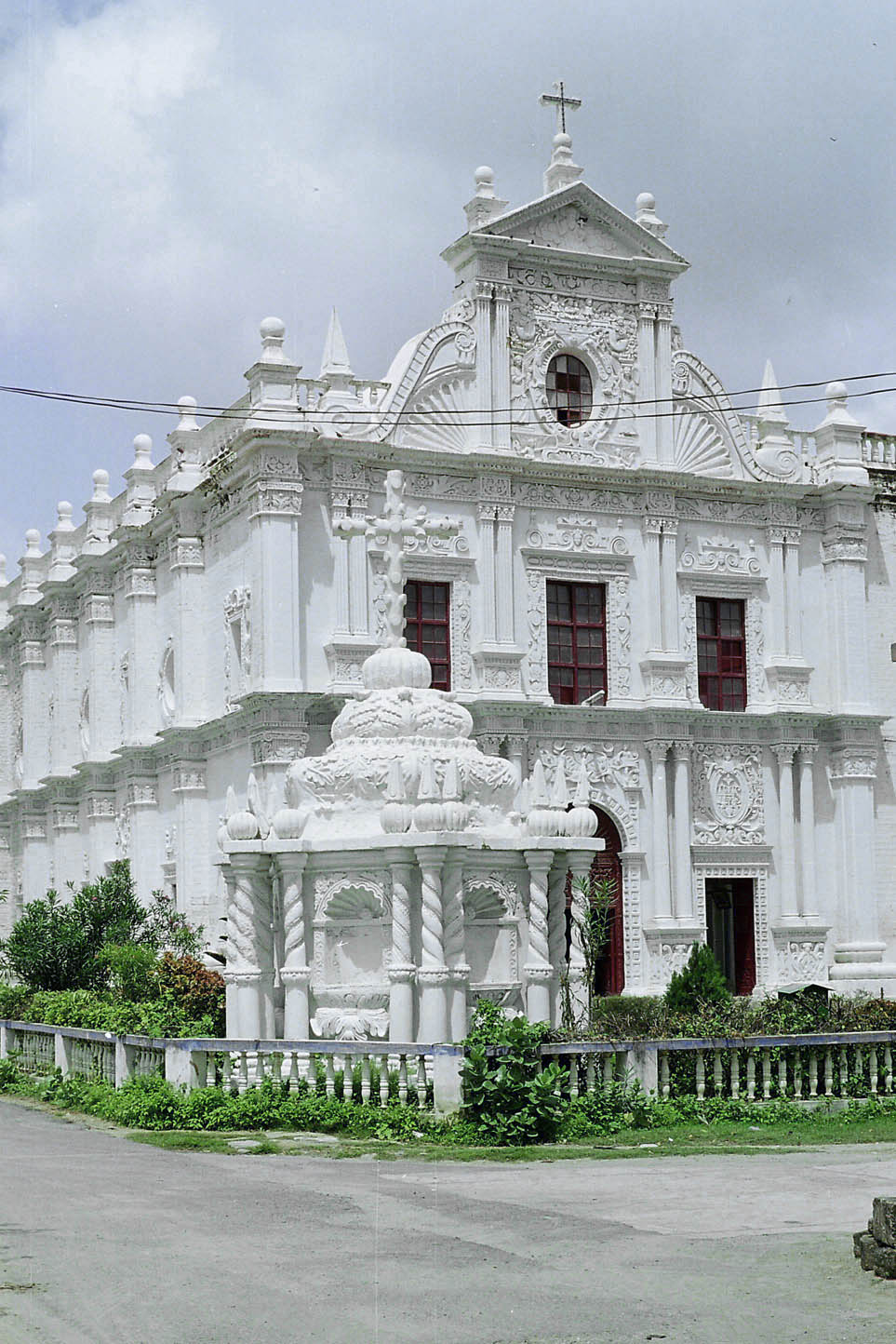
St. Paul's Church at Diu
