= Château de Dyo =

Castle in Bourgogne-Franche-Comté, France

Coordinates: 46°21′19″N 4°16′12″E

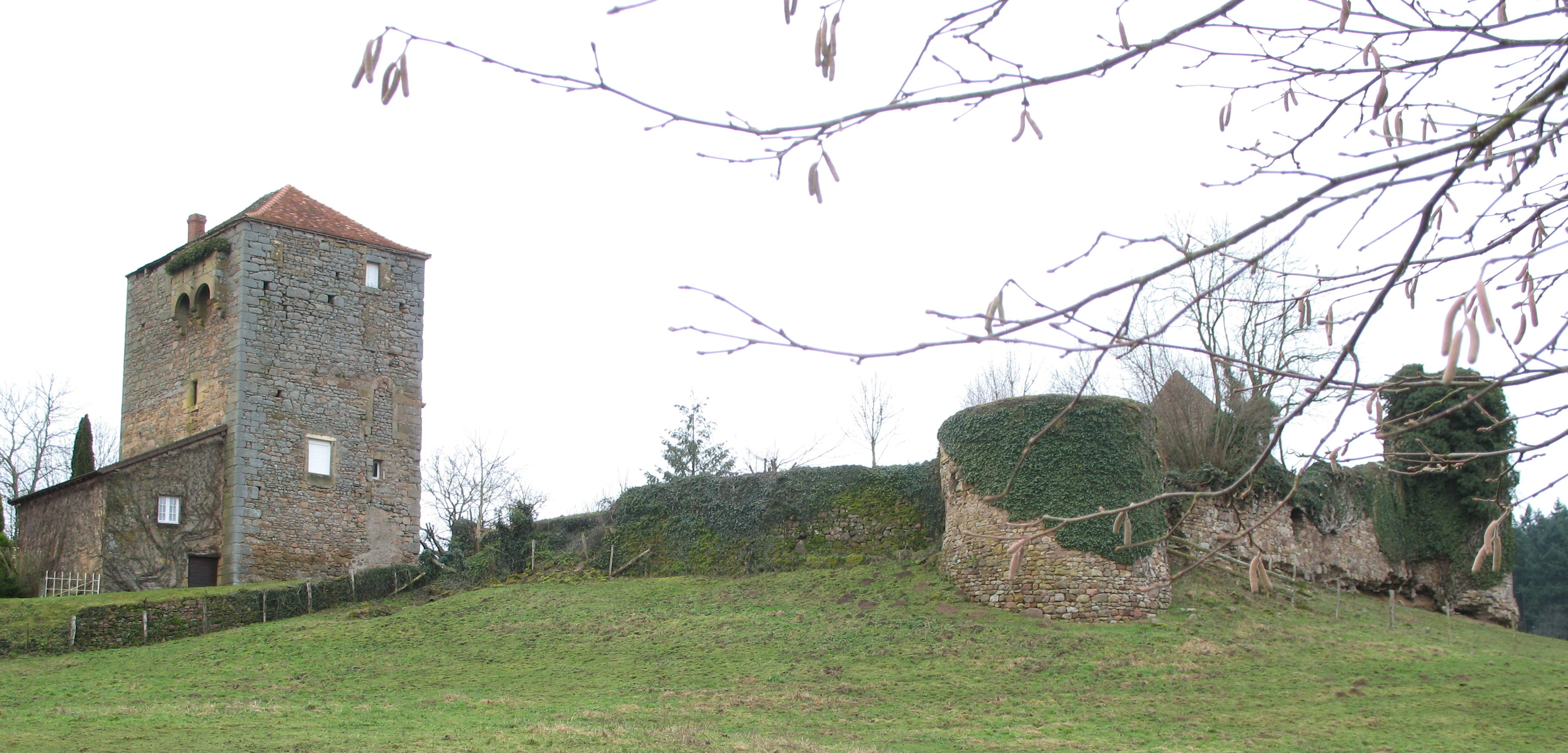
Remains of the Château de Dyo

The Château de Dyo is a ruined castle in the commune of Dyo in the Saône-et-Loire département of France. The castle stands on a hill in the village.

== Description ==
Of the large enceinte that once surrounded the summit of the hill, only stretches of the southern wall now remain - perhaps the part of the original castle itself. The bases of three circular towers are visible. To the west stands a high gate tower of almost square plan, pierced with a few openings, which seems to have been built in the 13th century. Residential buildings and barns - some built on the bases of the curtain walls - and vegetable gardens occupy the enceinte.

The castle is private property and not open to the public.

== History ==
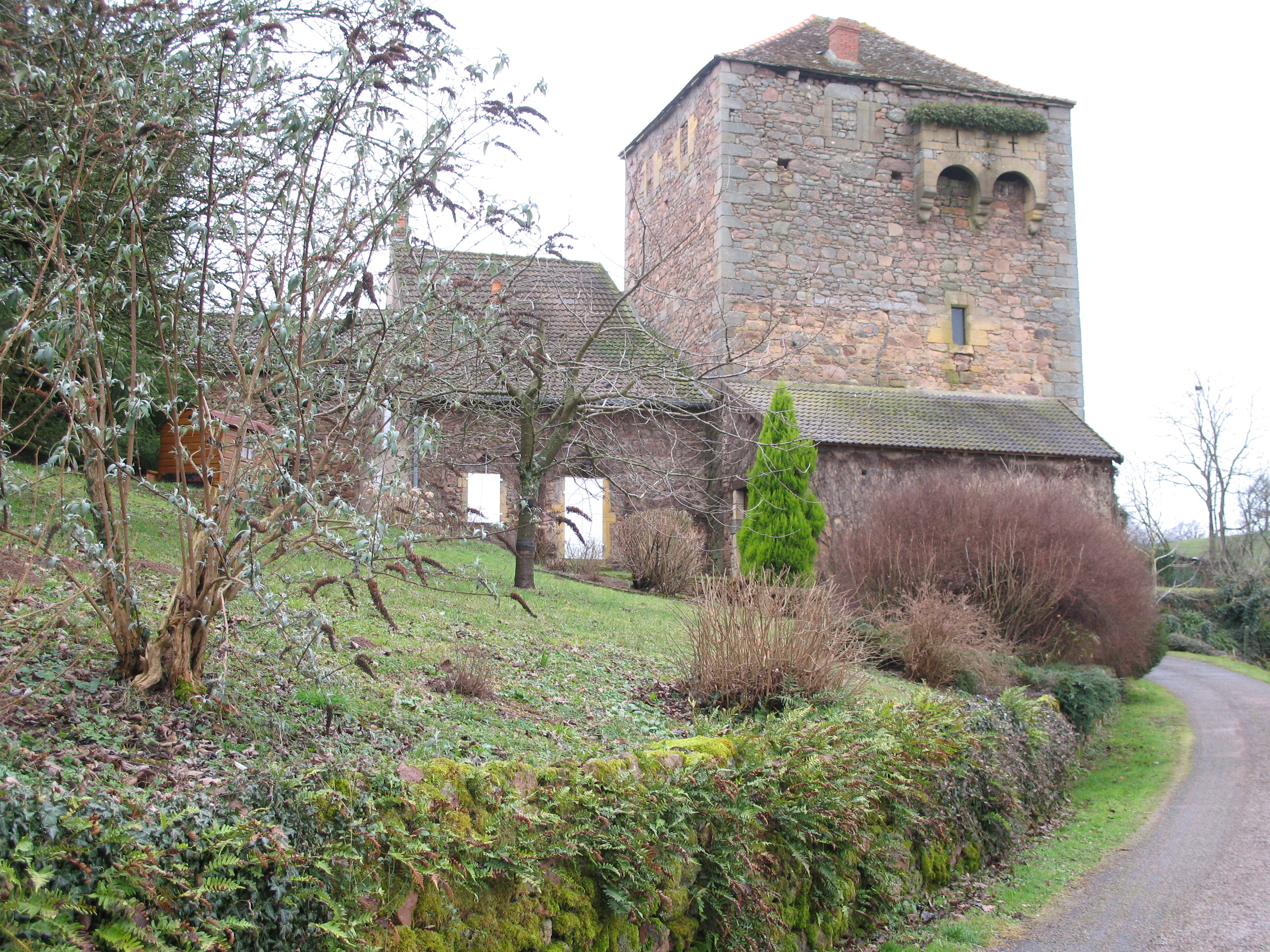
Château de Dyo - The gate house

Occupation of the site seems to date back to the Carolingian era.

- End of 11th century: the fiefdom belonged to the Dyo (or Dio) family.
- 1336: with the marriage of Guyot de Dyo and Alix Palatin, the Dyos added Palatin to their name.
- Middle of the 17th century: by marriage, Marie-Élisabeth Palatin de Dyo took the seigneurie to Louis-Antoine-Hérard (family of Damas d'Anlezy).
- 1789: Marie-Angélique de Gassion, widow of Louis Damas d'Anlezy, was owner.
- 18th century: the castle fell into ruins.
- Middle of the 20th century: renovations to the keep and part of the fortifications.
Arms of Palatin de Dyo

Arms of Damas

== See also ==
- List of castles in France

== Bibliography ==
- VIGNIER Françoise (sous la dir. de) : Le Guide des Châteaux de France, 71 Saône-et-Loire, Editions Hermé, Paris, 1985.
