= Dios (malos) (album) =

dios (malos)

Studio album by dios Malos
- Released: October 11, 2005

Dios Malos chronology
| dios (2004) | dios (malos) (2005) |

dios (malos) is an album by the band of the same name, dios (malos). It was released by Vagrant Records on October 11, 2005.

== Track listing ==
1. "Feels Good Being Somebody" - 3:15
2. "Say Anything" - 4:22
3. "I Want It All" - 2:45
4. "So Do I" - 5:08
5. "EPK" - 5:52
6. "Tokyo Sunrise" - 3:10
7. "Grrrl" - 2:45
8. "No Dance Now" - 3:18
9. "I Feel Fine All the Time" - 3:16
10. "My Broken Bones" - 6:28
11. "Later Skater" - 4:13
12. "Old Field Recordings" - 6:48

The band formed in 1999 and began practicing in Songwriter Joel Morales' father's house in Inglewood, California. The group was originally named simply "dios", but due to a legal threat from Ronnie James Dio changed their name to "dios (malos)" in 2004.

Current members of the band are:

- John Paul Caballero (bass)
- Jimmy Cabeza DeVaca (keyboards)
- Patrick Butterworth (drums)
- Joel Morales (guitar, vocals)
- Edwin Kampwirth (keyboards)
