= Diu Head =

Headland in the Arabian Sea

Coordinates: 20°41′19″N 70°49′46″E

Location of Diu Head in the Indian coast

Diu Head or Diu Point is a headland in the Arabian Sea. It is located at the southern end of the Kathiawar Peninsula in the Union Territory of Dadra and Nagar Haveli and Daman and Diu, India, close to the town of Diu and 17 km southeast of Kodinar town.

There is a lighthouse station on the point.

== See also ==
- Diu, India
