= Radio Dio =

Radio station in Saint-Étienne, France

Radio Dio is an independent radio station, broadcasting to the French city of Saint-Étienne and its outskirts. Its slogan is "Free, Wild, and Impertinent". Its mission is to speak to 'have-nots' and to promote the local, national and international independent scene. In spite of its emphasis on rock'n'roll, Radio Dio broadcasts a great diversity of current musical styles, including reggae, electro, and some blues and metal. Its logo is a cat because in Radio Dio, the cat ate the rat.

Dio broadcasts on the Internet and on FM frequency 89.5 MHz, in Saint-Etienne and its near surroundings. Having previously been a pirate station, Radio Dio was officially created in 1981, as part of the liberalization of the FM band. The station has three paid employees. It takes part in the diffusion and the discovery of talents, and particularly buildings.

It remains one of the few French radios not to broadcast adverts. Radio Dio is a founding member of the Ferarock national collective (of which it has always formed a part); a member of the Office and the commission d'Ecoute. It is also member of the collective d'associations ligériennes, the Slug, which manages the SMAC, Salle of the Current music of St Etienne, the Wire, which was inaugurated at the end of January 2008.
