= Dios (malos) =

American band

dios (malos)
- Origin: Hawthorne, California, United States
- Genres: Indie rock Acoustic; Folk
- Years active: 2005–present
- Label: Sabot Productions
- Members: Joel Morales; James Cabeza de Vaca; Edwin Kampwirth; John Paul Caballero
- Website: Official Website

The band dios (malos), formerly "dios" before summer 2004, is a music group originally out of Hawthorne, California. The band consists of singer-songwriter Joel Morales, keyboard players James Cabeza de Vaca and Edwin Kampwirth, bassist John Paul Caballero, and drummer Patrick Butterworth. In 2004 they released their (then) self-titled record dios on StarTime to generally positive reviews. Pitchfork Media rated the album 8.0 out of 10 and said it made California pop "a little less predictable". A follow-up album, dios (malos) was less well received, garnering 6.1 from Pitchfork.

== History ==
First formed sometime in the late 1990s with original members and brothers Joel and Kevin Morales, the group has gone through a few lineup and name changes over the past few years. Initially the group started out as an experiment to bring songwriter Joel Morales' songs from four-track to live band with brother Kevin Morales on drums and Joel playing guitar and singing. They practiced out of their father's home in Inglewood, California and eventually brought into the group Joel's lifelong schoolmate James Cabeza de Vaca and Kevin's classmate from El Camino College, John Paul Caballero. In 2002, the group began recording in Caballero's basement. Together the foursome worked out Joel's songs along with some covers and started to play around the Southbay (Torrance, Hermosa Beach, Redondo Beach etc.) under the name "god'. The band had a hard time coming up with a band name they liked and used god (in lowercase) because they felt it would be funny to see "god" playing at local venues.

Joel Morales has a penchant for the four-track recording arts, drawing inspiration from 90s independent acts like the Olivia Tremor Control, Apples In Stereo, and other Elephant Six Cooperatives, early Beck, K Records artists, and experimental recording superstars like the Beatles, Beach Boys and Os Mutantes. He brought this mindset of experimentation only with good songwriting and made it modus operandi for everything dios (malos) would do musically. After a few shows the band changed its name to dios, the Spanish word for god, and continued recording numerous demos with Joel and Kevin's growing backlog of songs. Kevin moved from the drums to second guitar contributing many of his own songs he had recently begun writing. They were joined by new drummer Jeffrey Enzor and begun playing any show they could get on, while recording demos entitled, "dios demo 001" and "dios demo 002".

The band sent the demos to various bands and magazines, eventually getting write-ups in various local magazines and in one very important recording magazine called Tape-Op, which was a favorite of the band because of the d.i.y., home recording, experiment-minded ethos the magazine celebrated. A demo eventually got into the hands of the band Grandaddy, whose drummer Aaron Burtch took time to write back and let the band know how much they had enjoyed the demo. Over the course of a few emails the band was encouraged to come to the Central Valley to play a show at a venue called The Mustang some time in 2002. A strong friendship was formed between the two bands, and Grandaddy eventually covered one of the songs from the demo entitled, "love you, grrrl", which later appeared on the "dios (malos)" album a few years later. The song was almost released as a b-side to a single on Grandaddy's Sumday album but is currently still unreleased.

In 2009 the band signed to Buddyhead Records.

== Songs ==
"You Got Me All Wrong", a dios (malos) cover of a song by friend Miguel Mendez, was used in an episode of The O.C. ("The Distance"). "Everyday" was also used in The O.C. ("The Game Plan").

== Discography ==
- dios (Startime International, 2004)
- dios (malos) (Startime International, 2005)
- Cosmic Rays EP (Buddyhead, 2009)
- WEAREDIOS (Buddyhead, 2009)
