= HMS Volage =

Six ships of the Royal Navy have borne the name HMS Volage:

- HMS Volage (1798) was a 22-gun sixth rate. She was the French privateer Volage, of 22 guns, that HMS Melampus captured in 1798; Volage was broken up in 1804.
- HMS Volage (1807) was a 22-gun sixth rate launched in 1807 and sold in 1818.
- HMS Volage (1825) was a 28-gun sixth rate launched in 1825. She was converted into a survey ship in 1847, lent to the War Department as a powder hulk in 1864 and broken up by 1874.
- HMS Volage (1869) was an iron screw corvette, ordered as HMS Cerberus but renamed in 1867 before being launched in 1869. She was broken up in 1904.
- HMS Volage was to have been a modified W-class destroyer but the order was cancelled in 1918.
- HMS Volage (R41) was a V-class destroyer launched in 1943. She was converted into an anti-submarine frigate in 1951 and sold in 1972.
