= Dyo =

- Commune
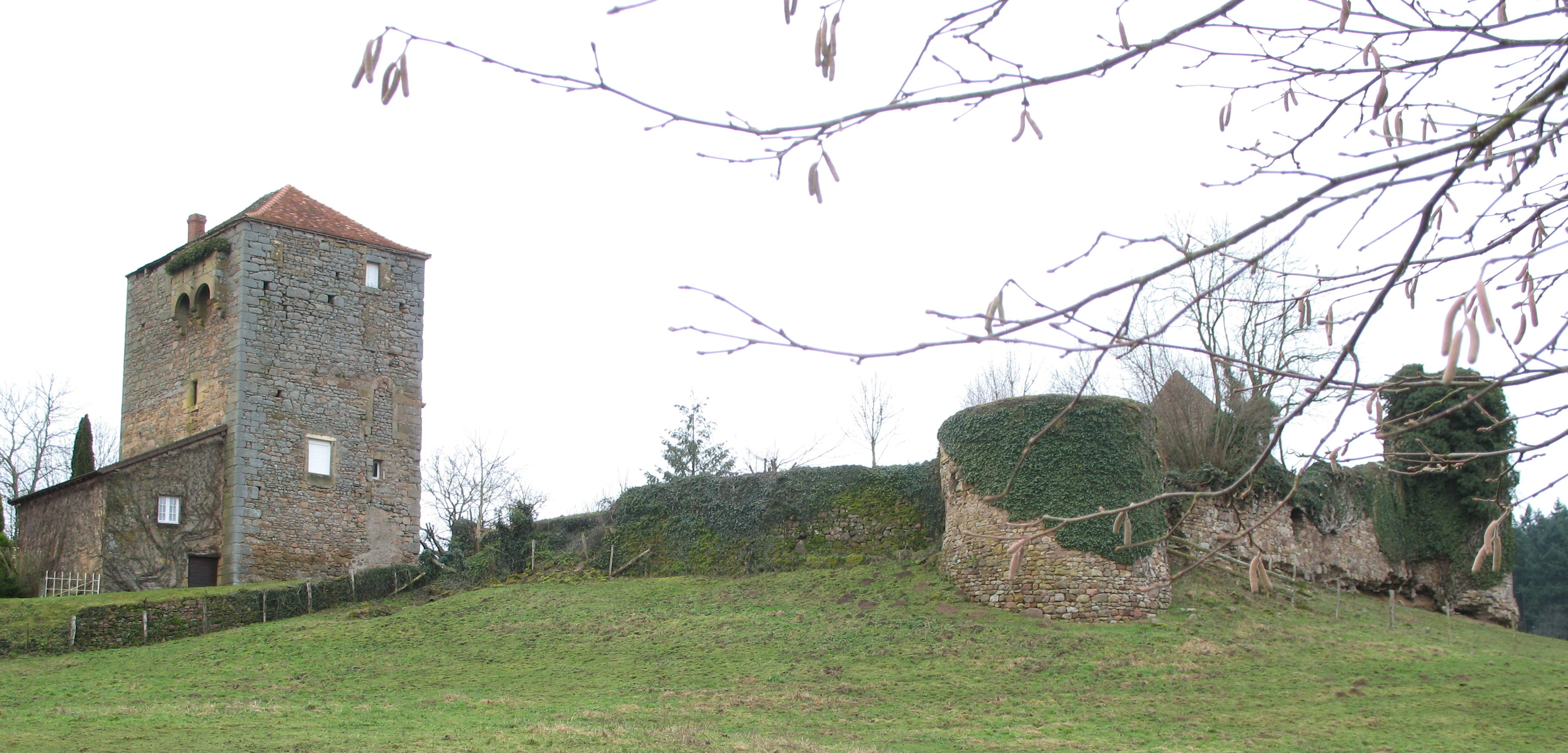
- Chateau

- Coat of arms
- Location of Dyo
- Location within France Location within Bourgogne-Franche-Comté
- Coordinates: 46°21′38″N 4°16′38″E
- Country: France
- Region: Bourgogne-Franche-Comté
- Department: Saône-et-Loire
- Arrondissement: Charolles
- Canton: Charolles

Government
  - Mayor (2020–2026): Jérôme Debarreix
- Area^{1}: 15.8 km^{2} (6.1 sq mi)
- Elevation: 363 m (1,191 ft)
- Highest elevation: 469 m (1,539 ft)
- Lowest elevation: 288 m (945 ft)
- Population (2023): 325
  - Density: 20.6/km^{2} (53.3/sq mi)
- Time zone: UTC+01:00 (CET)
  - Summer (DST): UTC+02:00 (CEST)
- INSEE/Postal code: 71185 /71800
- ^{1} French Land Register data, which excludes lakes, ponds, glaciers > 1 km^{2} (0.386 sq mi or 247 acres) and river estuaries.

Dyo (French pronunciation: [djo]) is a commune in the Saône-et-Loire department in the region of Bourgogne-Franche-Comté in eastern France.

== Sights ==
- Château de Dyo - remains of castle

== See also ==
- Communes of the Saône-et-Loire department
