= Diu Diu Cave =

Cave in Papua New Guinea

- Location: Waigani, Milne Bay Province

Diu Diu Cave is a karst cave located in Waigani, Milne Bay Province, Papua New Guinea. Traversing through the cave is very difficult; it involves wading through mud and guano with a low ceiling that at times dips to 80cm clearance. The cave is home to a population of blind cave eel, cave prawn, cave spiders and various species of bats, including flying foxes.
