= Dios (album) =

dios

Studio album by dios Malos
- Released: April 6, 2004
- Length: 49:45
- Label: Startime

Dios Malos chronology
dios (2004)	dios (malos) (2005)

Professional ratings
Review scores
Source	Rating
Allmusic	4/5 stars

dios is an album by dios (malos) released by Startime International in 2004. This album was chosen as one of Amazon.com's Top 100 Editor's Picks of 2005 (#84).

== Track listing ==
1. "Nobody's Perfect" – 5:27
2. "Starting Five" – 3:17
3. "The Uncertainty of How Things Are" – 4:29
4. "Fifty Cents" – 4:17
5. "All Said & Done" – 5:27
6. "You'll Get Yours" – 3:08
7. "Birds" – 2:56
8. "You Make Me Feel Uncomfortable" – 3:59
9. "Just Another Girl" – 3:10
10. "You Got Me All Wrong" – 3:13
11. "Meeting People" – 5:37
12. "All My Life" – 4:45
