= Diou =

Diou may refer to:

- Diou, Allier, a commune in the French department of Allier
- Diou, Indre, a commune in the French department of Indre
- Diou, Mali, a village and commune in Mali
- Paul Emile Diou (1855–1914), French general

== See also ==
- Diu (disambiguation)
