= Diu, India =

Diu Diu Town
- City
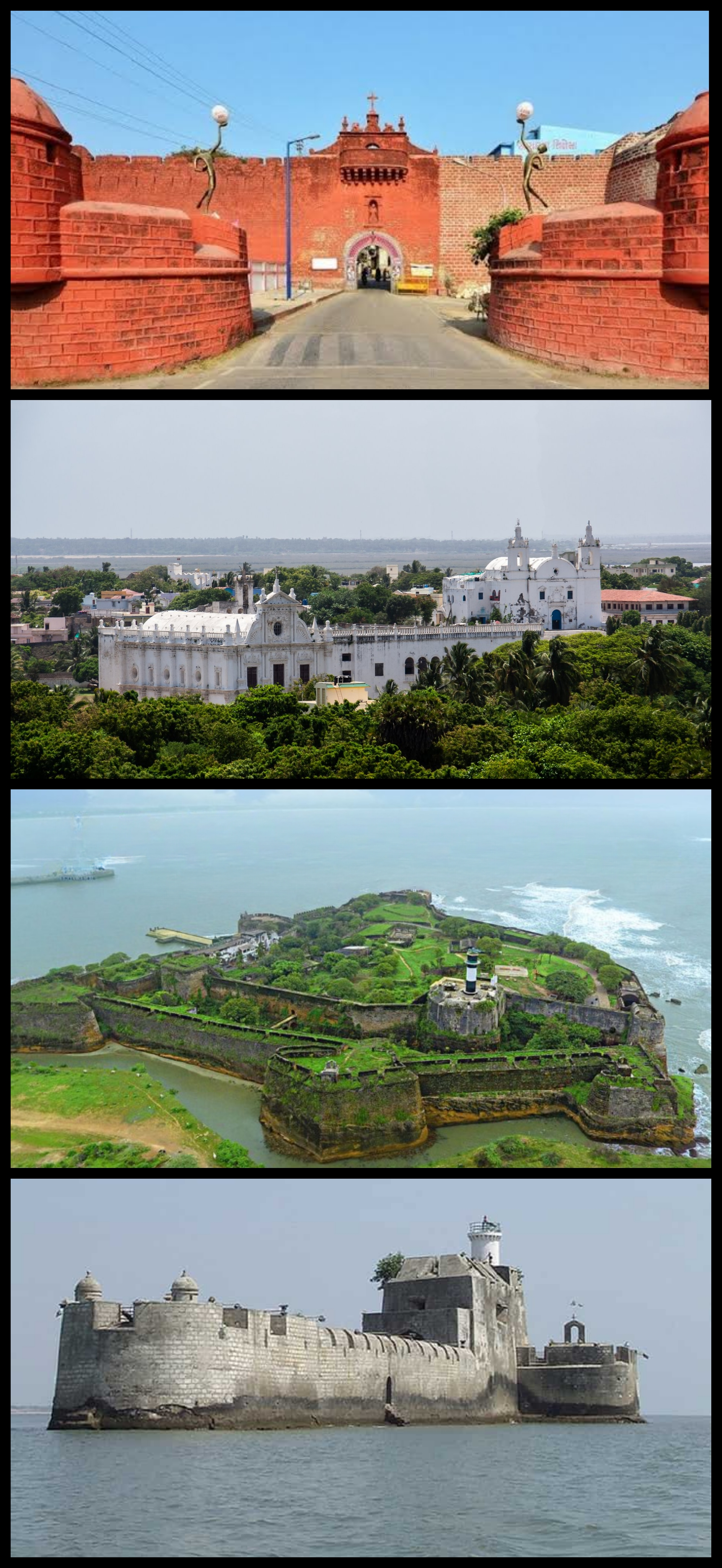
- From top to bottom: 1. Zampa Gateway; 2. Churches of São Paulo (left) and São Tomás (right); 3. Citadel of Diu; 4. Fortim do Mar

- Location in India
- Coordinates: 20°42′57″N 70°59′09″E
- Country: India
- Union Territory: Dadra and Nagar Haveli and Daman and Diu
- District: Diu
- Established: 1500s

Government
  - Type: Municipal Council
  - Body: Diu Municipal Council
  - President: Smt. Hemlatabai Rama

Area
  - Total: 40 km^{2} (15 sq mi)
- Elevation: 0 m (0 ft)

Population (2011)
  - Total: 52,076
  - Density: 1,300/km^{2} (3,400/sq mi)

Languages
  - Official: Hindi, English
  - Other: Gujarati, Diu Indo-Portuguese
- Time zone: UTC+5:30 (IST)
- PIN CODE: 362520
- Telephone code: (International) +91-2875-, (National) 02875-
- Vehicle registration: DD-02
- Sex ratio: 0.85 ♂/♀
- Website: https://diu.gov.in/

Diu (English: /'diːuː/, Hindi: [d̪iːʋ]), also known as Diu Town, is a medieval fortified town in Diu district in the union territory of Dadra and Nagar Haveli and Daman and Diu, India. Diu district is the tenth least populated district of India. The town of Diu lies at the eastern end of Diu Island and is known for its fortress and old Portuguese cathedral. It is a fishing town.

The city is one of the hundred Indian cities competing in a national-level competition to get funds under Narendra Modi's flagship Smart Cities Mission. Diu will be competing for one of the last 10 spots against 20 cities from across India. In April 2018, it was reported that the Diu Smart City has already become India's first city to run on 100 percent renewable energy during the daytime.

== History ==
The town and district were historically part of the Saurashtra region of Gujarat state and an important port on trade routes of the Arabian Sea of the Indian Ocean.

Due to its strategic importance, there was a Battle of Diu in 1509 between Portugal and a combined force of Mamluks, Venetians, the Ragusians, the Zamorin of Calicut, and the Sultan of Gujarat, Mahmud Begada. In 1513, the Portuguese tried to establish an outpost, but negotiations were unsuccessful. There were failed attempts by Diogo Lopes de Sequeira in 1521 and Nuno da Cunha in 1523. In 1531 the conquest attempted by Nuno da Cunha was unsuccessful.

In 1535 Bahadur Shah, the Sultan of Gujarat, concluded a defensive alliance with the Portuguese against the Mughal emperor Humayun and allowed the Portuguese to construct the Diu Fort and maintain a garrison on the island.

The alliance quickly unravelled and attempts by the Sultans to oust the Portuguese from Diu between 1537 and 1546 failed. Bahadur Shah sought to recover Diu but was defeated and killed by the Portuguese, followed by a period of war between them and the people of Gujarat. In 1538, Coja Sofar, Lord of Cambay, together with the Ottoman Suleiman Pasha, came to lay siege to Diu and were defeated by Portuguese resistance led by Anthony Silveira. A second siege was imposed by the same Coja Sofar in 1546. It was repelled by the Portuguese conquerors, led on land by João Mascarenhas and at sea by João de Castro. Coja Sofar and Fernando de Castro, son of the Portuguese viceroy, perished in the struggle. The fortress, completed by Dom João de Castro after the siege of 1545, still stands.

After this second siege, Diu was so fortified that it could withstand later attacks of the Arabs of Muscat and the Dutch in the late 17th century. From the 18th century, Diu declined in strategic importance (due to the development of Bombay) and was reduced to a museum or historical landmark as a commercial and strategic bulwark in the struggle between the forces of the Islamic East and Christian West.

Diu remained a possession of the Portuguese from 1535 until 1961, when it fell to troops of the Indian Union, who conquered all of former Portuguese India under Operation Vijay. The island was occupied by the Indian military on 19 December 1961. The Battle of Diu involved overwhelming land, sea and air strikes on the enclave for 48 hours until the Portuguese garrison there surrendered. It was declared a union territory of India, Goa, Daman, and Diu. Goa separated as a state in 1987; the remainder became union territory of Daman and Diu. On 26 January 2020, the union territory of Daman and Diu was merged with Dadra and Nagar Haveli to form the union territory of Dadra and Nagar Haveli and Daman and Diu.

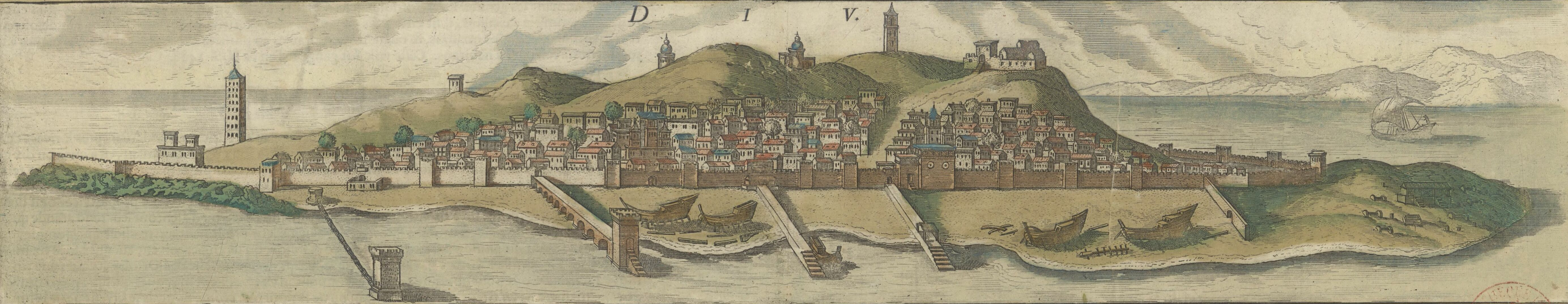
Diu in the late 16th century (in Braun et Hogenberg, 1582)

== Population ==
=== Languages ===
The languages spoken in Diu include Gujarati, English, Hindi and Diu Indo-Portuguese Creole.

=== Demographics ===
As of the 2011 Census of India, Diu had a population of 23,991 spread over 5,249 households. Males constituted 48.4% of the population and females 51.6%. Diu had an average literacy rate of 92%, In Diu, 10% of the population is under 6 years of age.

== Geography and climate ==
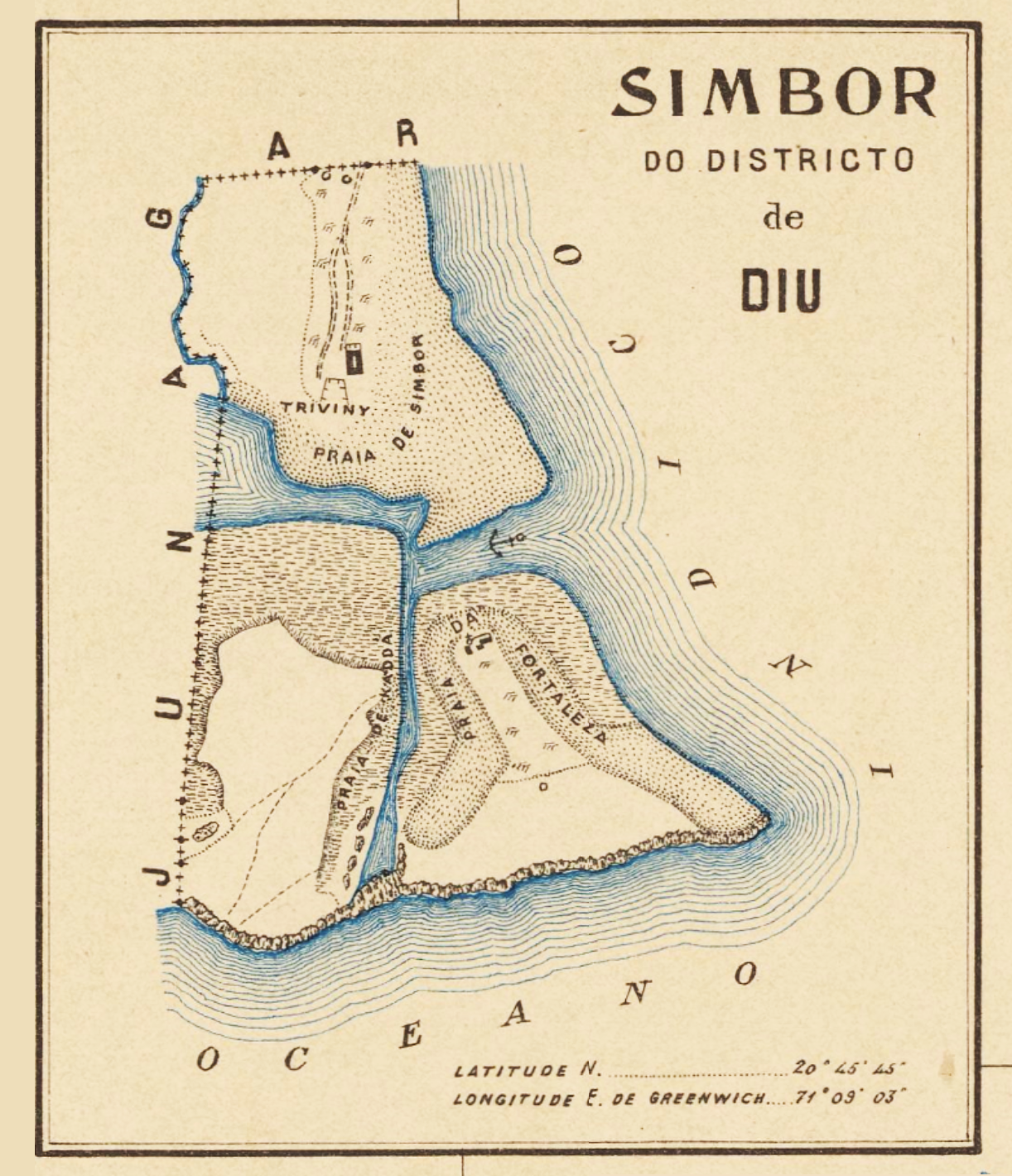
Territory of Simbor

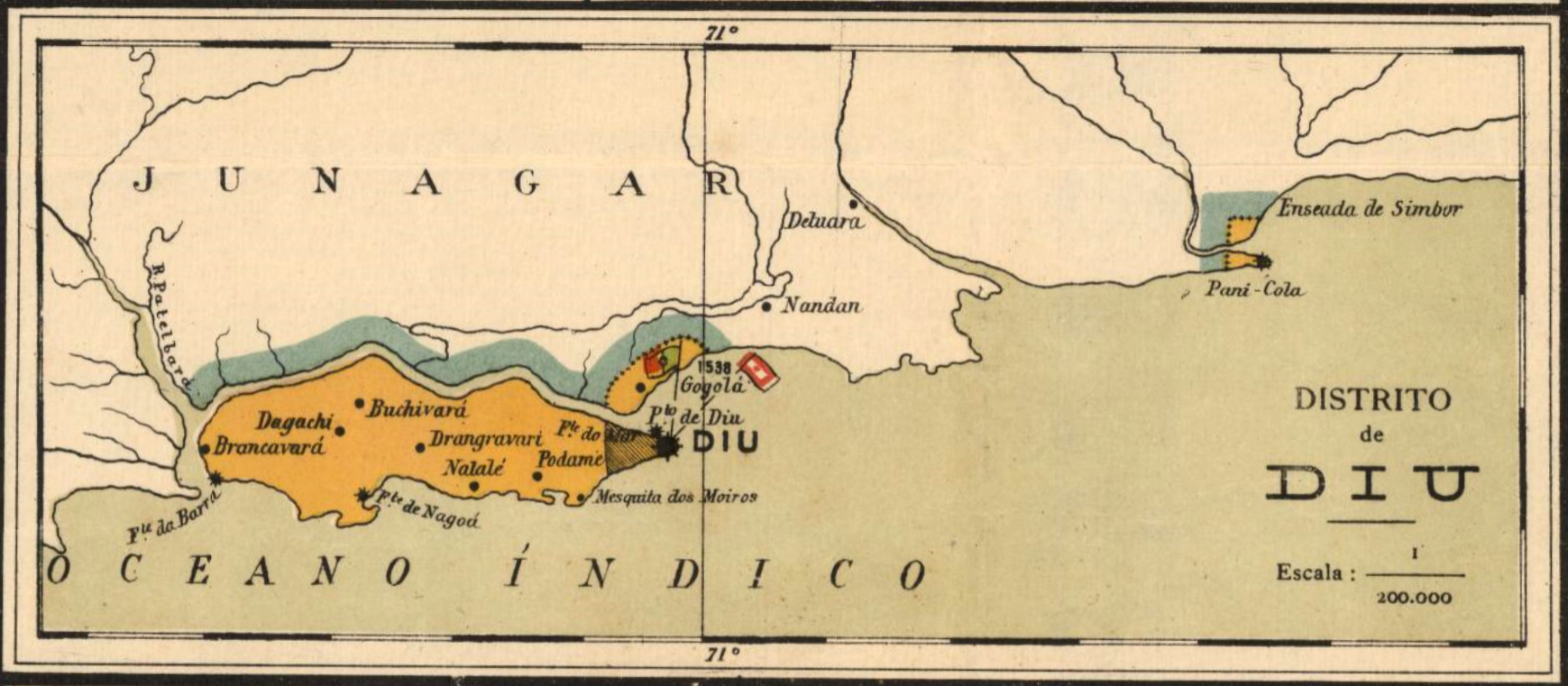
Portuguese map showing the district of Diu, including Simbor

Diu is at 20.71°N 70.98°E.

The island is at sea level and covers an area of 38.8 square kilometres or 15.0 square miles. Diu has a tropical savannah (Köppen Aw), with an average annual rainfall of 848 millimetres or 33 inches, of which all but 25 millimetres (1.0 in) falls between June and September.

Climate data for Diu (1991-2020, extremes 1967-2020)
Month	Jan	Feb	Mar	Apr	May	Jun	Jul	Aug	Sep	Oct	Nov	Dec	Year
Record high °C (°F)	34.9 (94.8)	38.2 (100.8)	40.7 (105.3)	42.4 (108.3)	44.0 (111.2)	39.0 (102.2)	35.6 (96.1)	34.3 (93.7)	36.8 (98.2)	39.3 (102.7)	37.4 (99.3)	34.8 (94.6)	44.0 (111.2)
Mean daily maximum °C (°F)	28.6 (83.5)	29.7 (85.5)	32.2 (90.0)	33.3 (91.9)	33.7 (92.7)	33.4 (92.1)	31.2 (88.2)	30.8 (87.4)	31.6 (88.9)	33.9 (93.0)	32.7 (90.9)	30.1 (86.2)	31.8 (89.2)
Mean daily minimum °C (°F)	12.2 (54.0)	13.3 (55.9)	16.3 (61.3)	20.2 (68.4)	24.5 (76.1)	25.8 (78.4)	24.7 (76.5)	23.5 (74.3)	22.2 (72.0)	20.6 (69.1)	16.2 (61.2)	14.1 (57.4)	19.6 (67.3)
Record low °C (°F)	5.0 (41.0)	5.2 (41.4)	8.7 (47.7)	10.5 (50.9)	18.3 (64.9)	17.6 (63.7)	17.5 (63.5)	13.5 (56.3)	14.8 (58.6)	13.0 (55.4)	10.6 (51.1)	6.0 (42.8)	5.0 (41.0)
Average rainfall mm (inches)	0.3 (0.01)	0.2 (0.01)	0.0 (0.0)	0.1 (0.00)	4.2 (0.17)	142.6 (5.61)	365.1 (14.37)	154.3 (6.07)	144.8 (5.70)	19.0 (0.75)	16.9 (0.67)	0.5 (0.02)	848.1 (33.39)
Average rainy days	0.1	0.0	0.0	0.0	0.1	5.4	12.1	9.0	5.3	1.3	0.3	0.2	33.8
Average relative humidity (%) (at 17:30 IST)	53	55	57	64	71	75	82	80	76	67	61	55	66
Source: India Meteorological Department

== Education ==
- Diu College

== Landmarks ==
With no tall buildings except the fort, the town of Diu has a characteristically low skyline and is known for its Portuguese architecture.

Diu has a white sand beach to the north.

=== Forts ===
Diu Fort was built in 1535 and maintained an active garrison until 1960.

The Diu fort is the most visited landmark in the district. The fort and the Basilica of Bom Jesus in Old Goa were chosen as the two wonders from India, among the seven from across the world, out of a list of 27 monuments built in 16 countries during the Portuguese rule. The fort is built on a hillock next to the sea.

Fortim do Mar is a sea fort in the Diu channel between the island of Diu and the Gogolá peninsula. It has an iconic ship-shaped structure.

=== Churches ===
There are three surviving Portuguese Baroque church buildings, with St. Paul’s Church, completed in 1610, being the only one still in use for its intended purpose. The Church of St. Francis of Assisi (the first church built in Diu, in 1593) is now used as a hospital. St. Thomas' Church is used as a museum.

=== Chapels ===
There are several Chapels scattered in various parts of the town. Some of the prominent ones are: Mother of God Chapel, Our Lady of Rosary Chapel and the Bastion Chapels of the city wall and fort.

== Transport ==
Diu is linked to the mainland Gujarat by a bridge. Local transport is available by road from Una, Rajula and Mahuva in Gujarat. Diu Airport has direct flights to Mumbai and Keshod operated by Alliance Air, Ahmedabad and Surat operated by IndiGo and North Goa operated by Star Air. Jet Airways, also used to have services here until it was bankrupted in 2019.

== See also ==
- Portuguese India
- Goans
- Union Territories
