= Códice Casanatense =

16th-century Portuguese illustrations

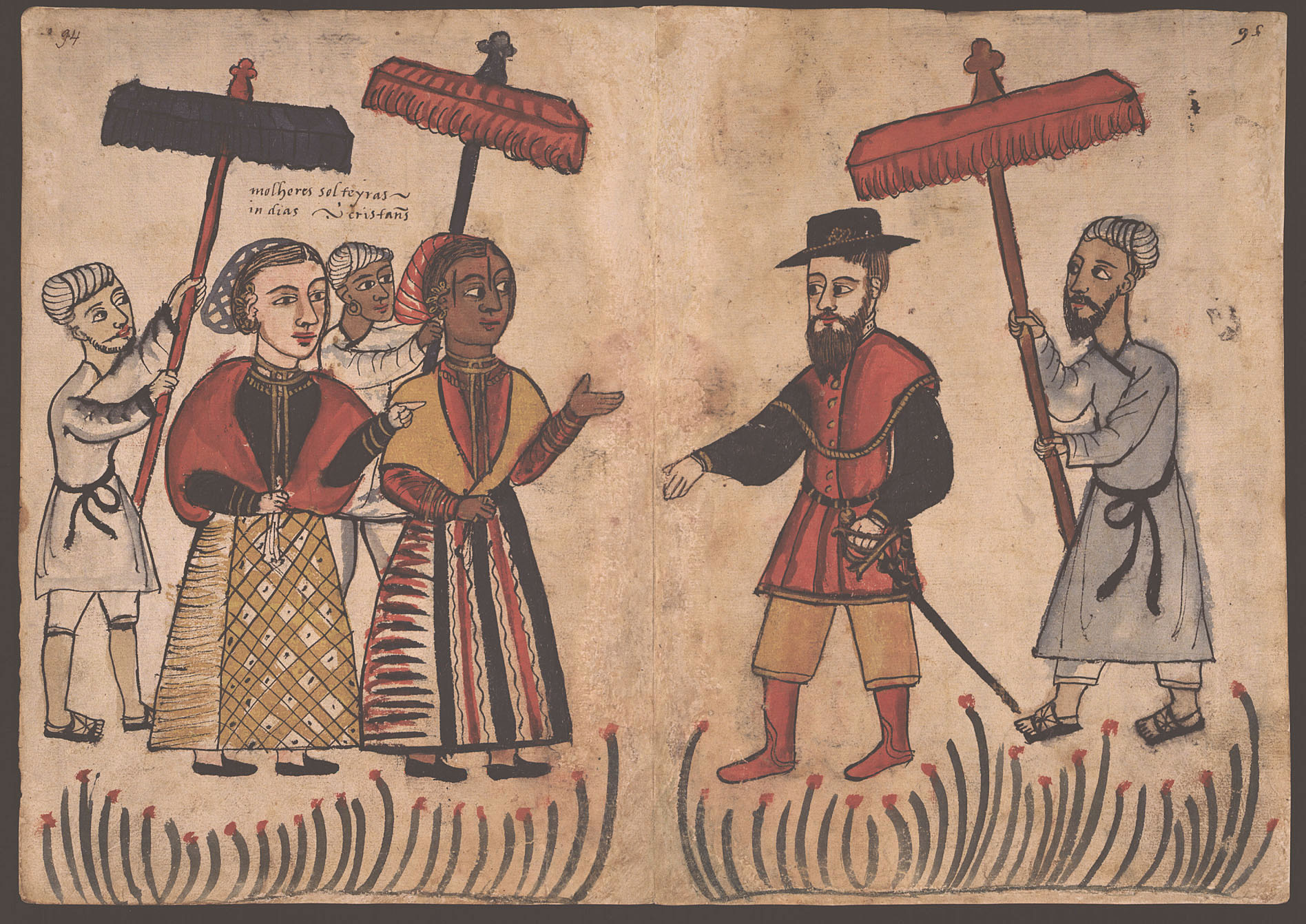
- A Portuguese nobleman in India, illustration from the Códice Casanatense (c. 1540).

Overview
- Official name: Album di disegni, illustranti usi e costumi dei popoli d'Asia e d'Africa con brevi dichiarazioni in lingua portoghese
- Common ID: Codex Casanatense 1889
- Created: c. 1538 – early 1560s
- Origin: Goa, Portuguese India

Physical Characteristics
- Format: Codex / Album
- Material: Ink and watercolor on paper
- Size: 142 pages
- Condition: Complete; 76 watercolor illustrations

History & Provenance
- Language: Portuguese (captions)
- Artist: Unknown (Indian artist trained in a Sultanate studio)
- Earliest Owner: João da Costa (sent to Lisbon in 1627)
- Later Owner: Cardinal Girolamo Casanata (acquired 17th century)
- Holding Repository: Biblioteca Casanatense (Rome, Italy)

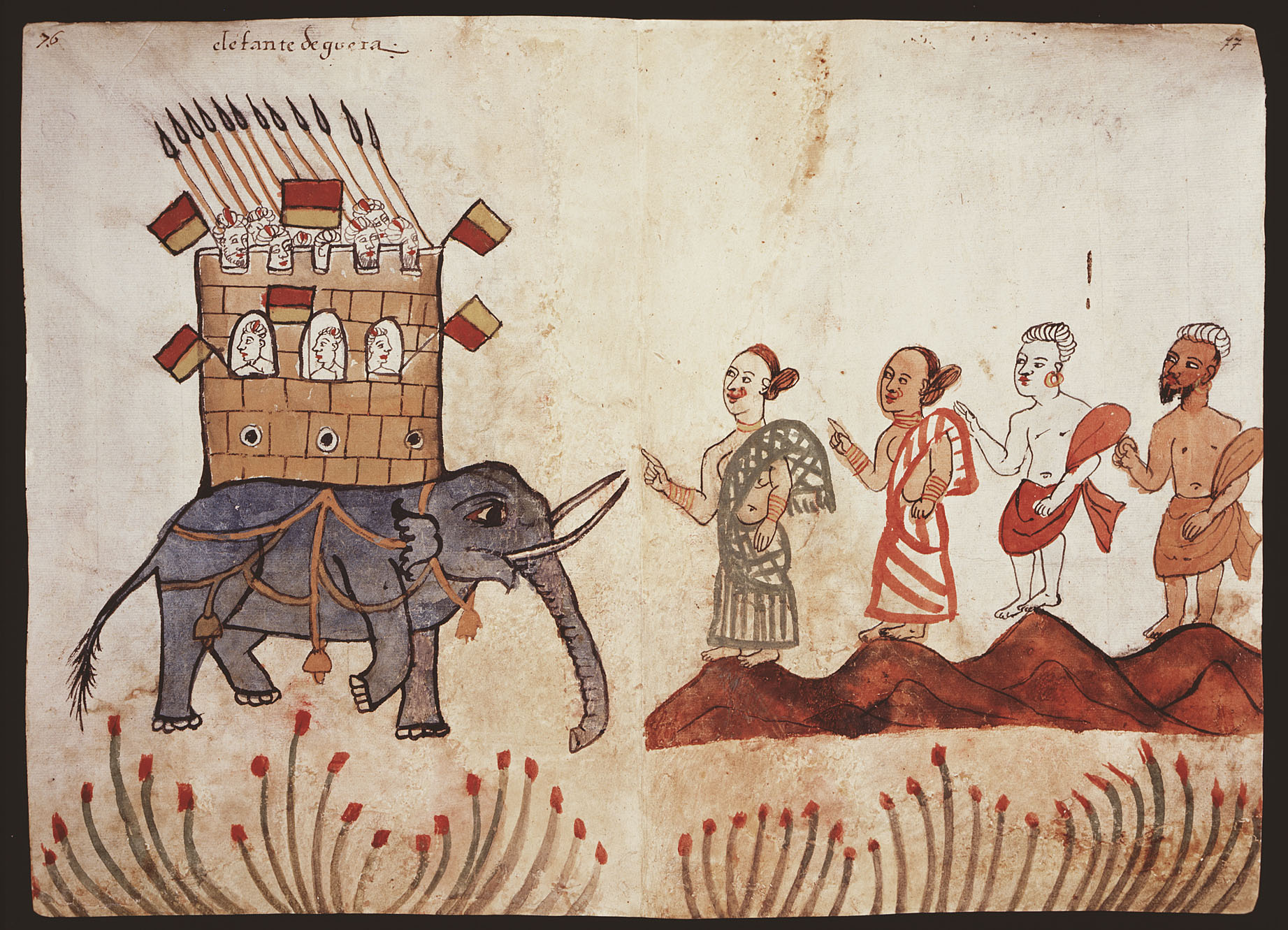
A war elephant, from the Códice Casanatense

The Códice Casanatense, its popular Portuguese title, or the Codex Casanatense 1889, is a set of 16th-century Portuguese illustrations, which depict peoples and cultures whom the Portuguese frequently had contact with around the Indian and Pacific Oceans. It is now kept at the Biblioteca Casanatense in Rome, with the official designation of Album di disegni, illustranti usi e costumi dei popoli d'Asia e d'Africa con brevi dichiarazioni in lingua portoghese ("Album of drawings, illustrating the uses and customs of the people of Asia and Africa with brief descriptions in Portuguese language").

== Contents and origin ==
The codex consists of seventy-six watercolor illustrations, one of which is a later addition. Most come with a short description, and include illustrations of people from east Africa, Arabia, Persia, Afghanistan, Balochistan, India, Ceylon, Malaysia, China, and the Moluccas, as well as some insights into fauna, flora, and certain traditions, such as the Hindu religion—previously unknown in Europe. Several of its inscriptions provide information as to the date it was made, namely the allusion to the siege of Diu in 1538, but the absence of any mention of the Japanese, whom the Portuguese contacted in 1541–1543. It is therefore possible it was made circa 1540.

Its earliest recorded owner was the novice João da Costa of the College of St. Paul of Goa, who in 1627 sent it to Lisbon, according to information inscribed within the codex. Once in Europe, it was acquired by Cardinal Girolamo Casanata who, on his death in 1700, bequeathed it along with his private collection to the Dominican Order, for the creation of a new library, where it is now kept. It was first brought to public attention by the scholar Georg Schurhammer, who published several pictures in the Portuguese historical magazine Garcia da Horta in the 1950s.

The Códice Casanatense provides an insight into the culture of the peoples in 16th-century Africa and Asia, and is valuable for the study of popular arms and garments of the era.

== Gallery ==
=== Sub-Saharan Africa ===
==== Abyssinia ====
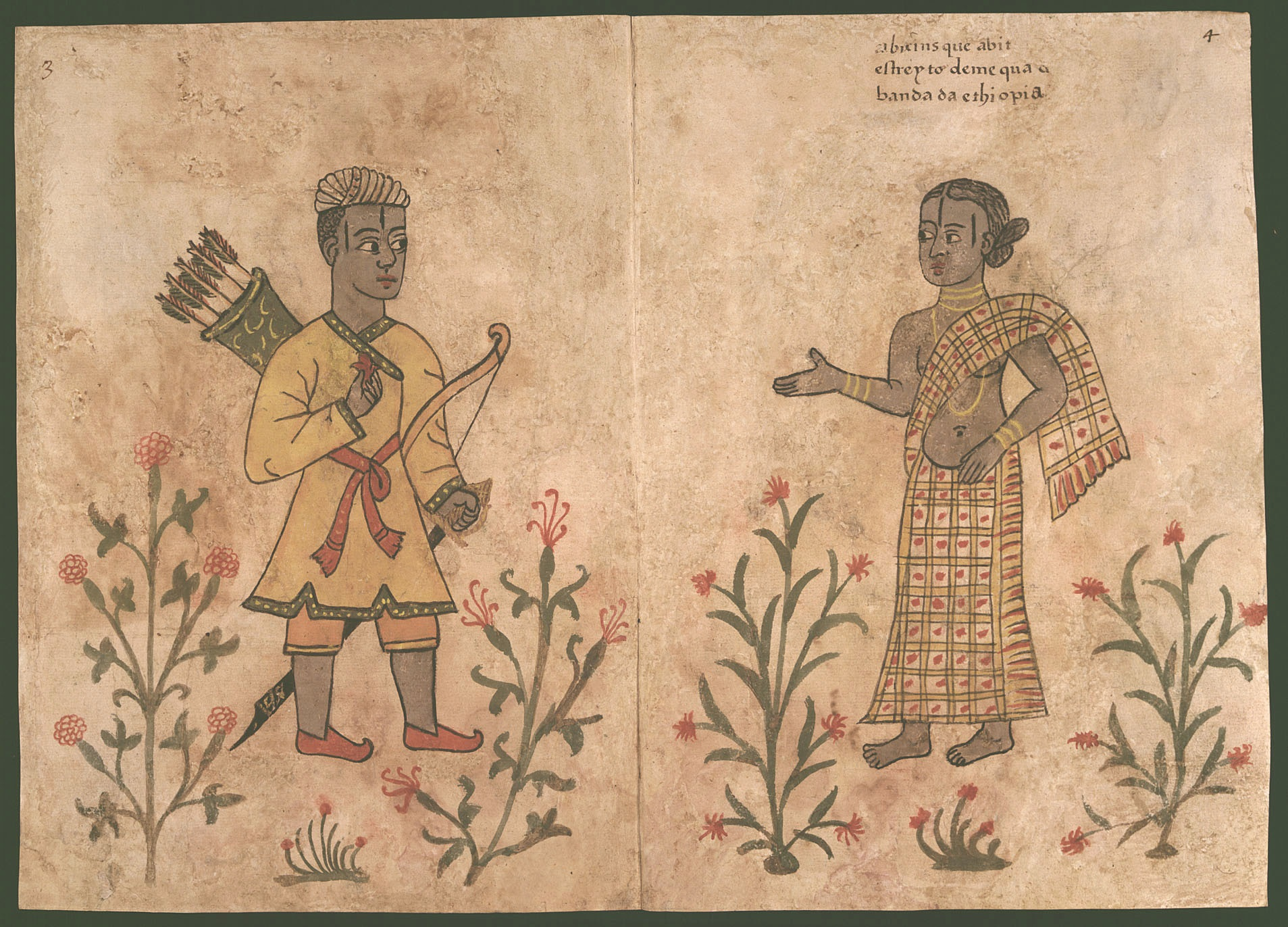
Abyssinian warrior and his wife

==== Nubia ====
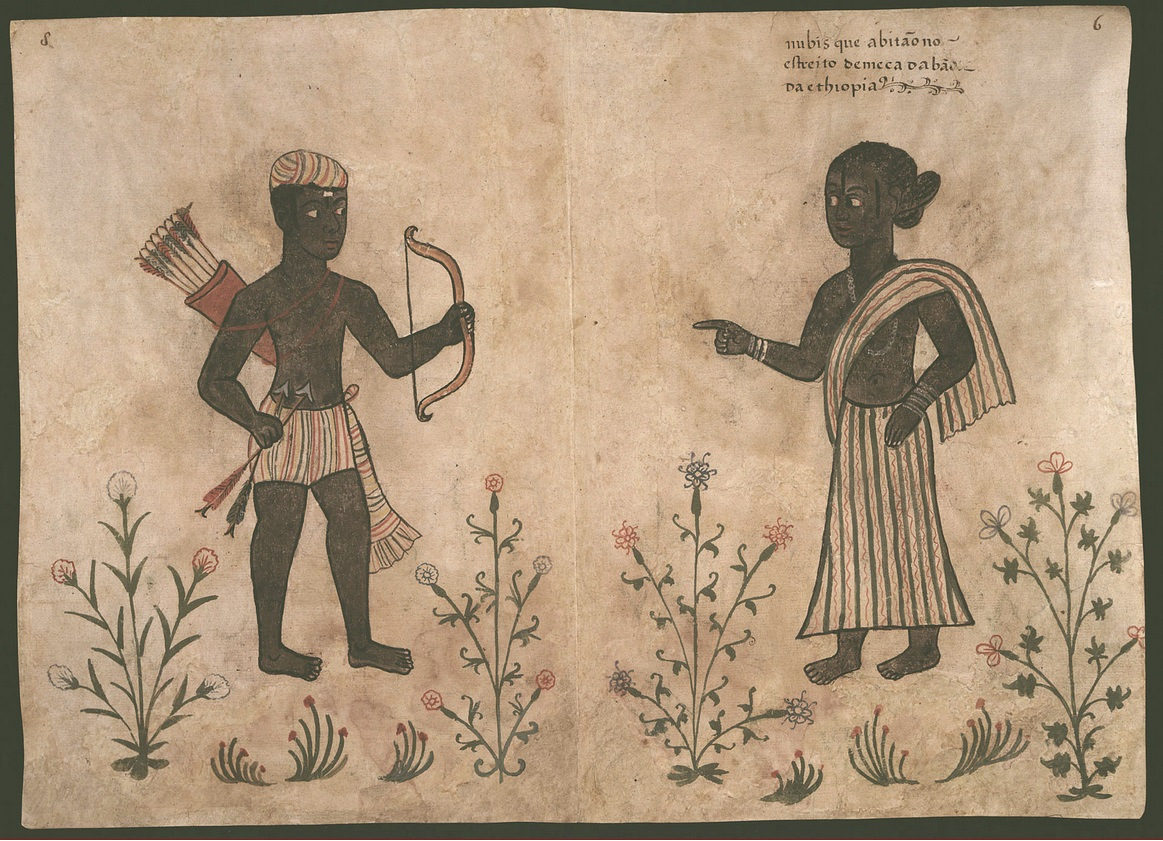
Nubians

==== Cafreria ====
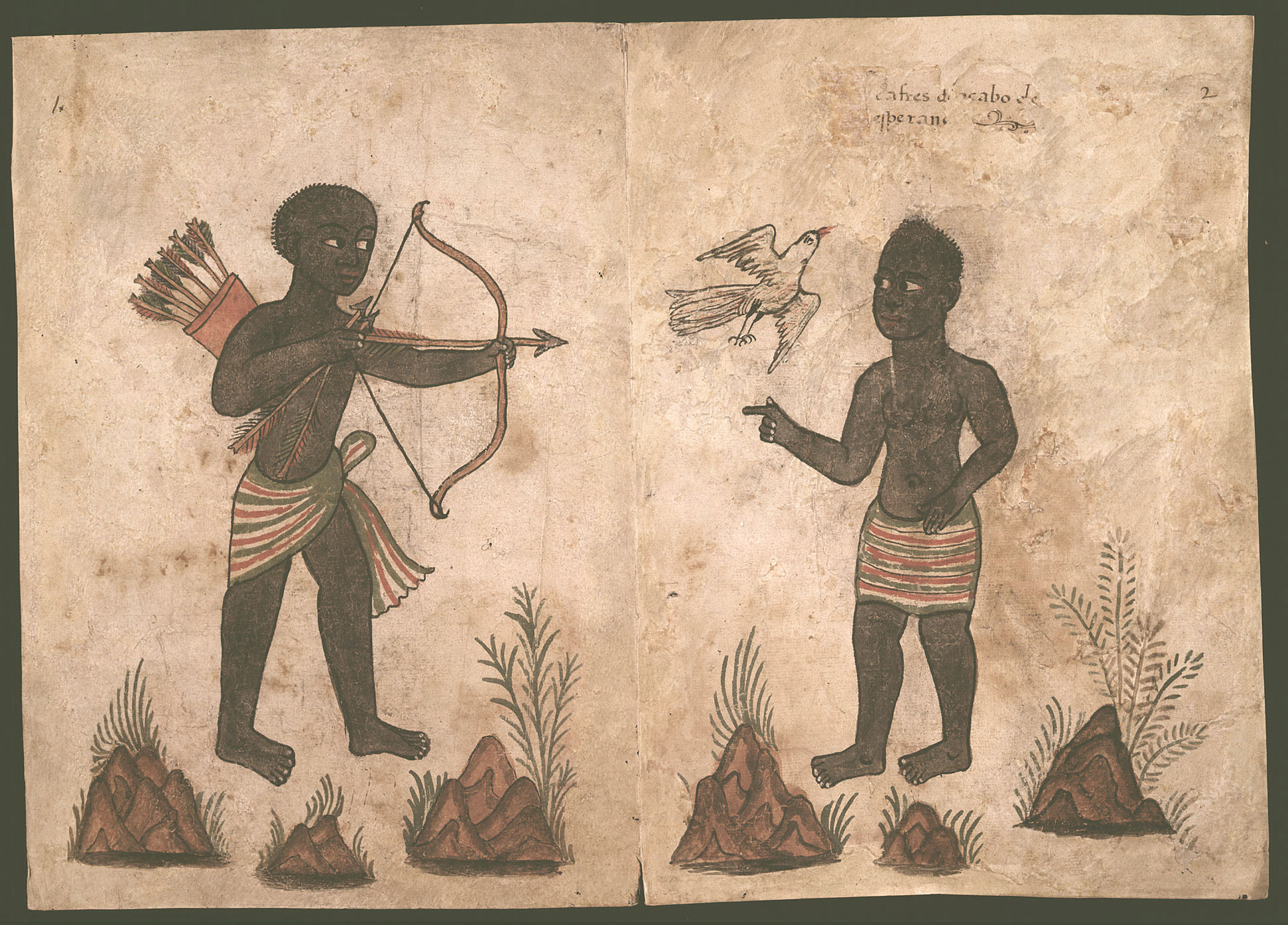
Inhabitants of the headland on the Atlantic coast of the Cape Peninsula, South Africa, named Cabo da Boa Esperança and its inhabitants dubbed Cafres by the Portuguese

=== West Asia ===
==== Arabia ====
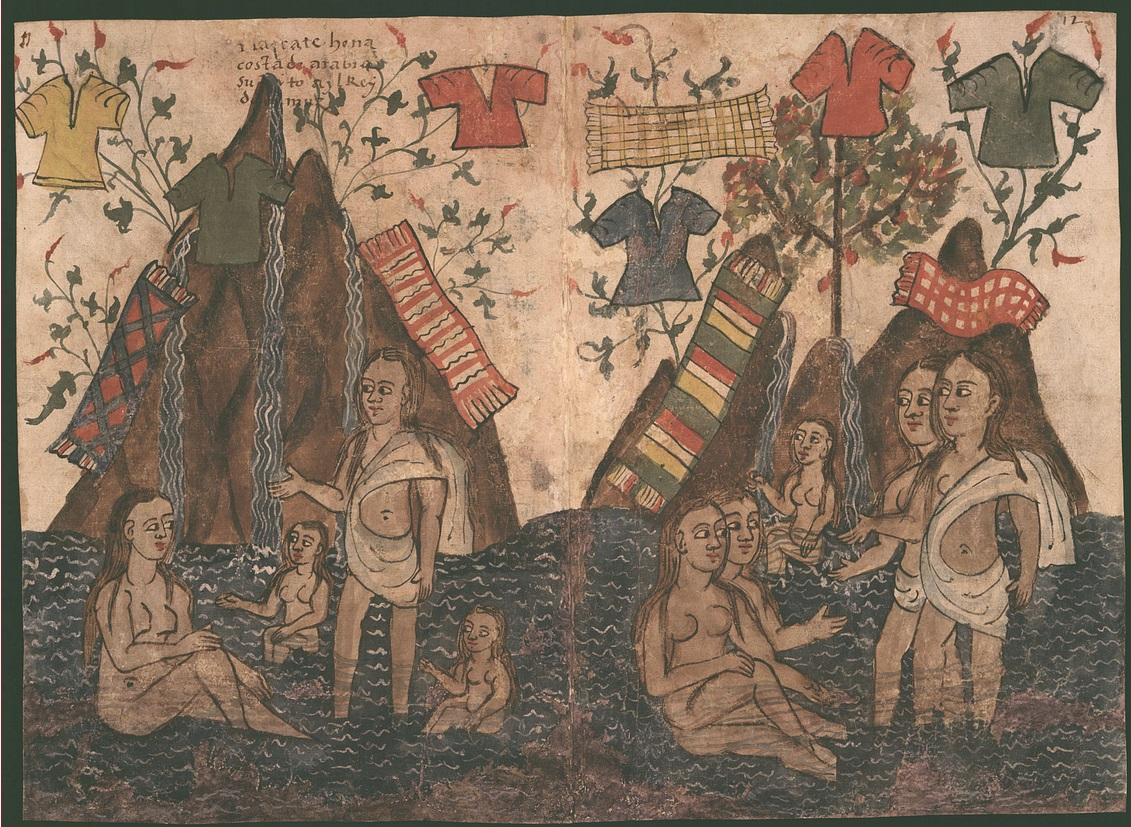
Bathing scene of the women of Muscat

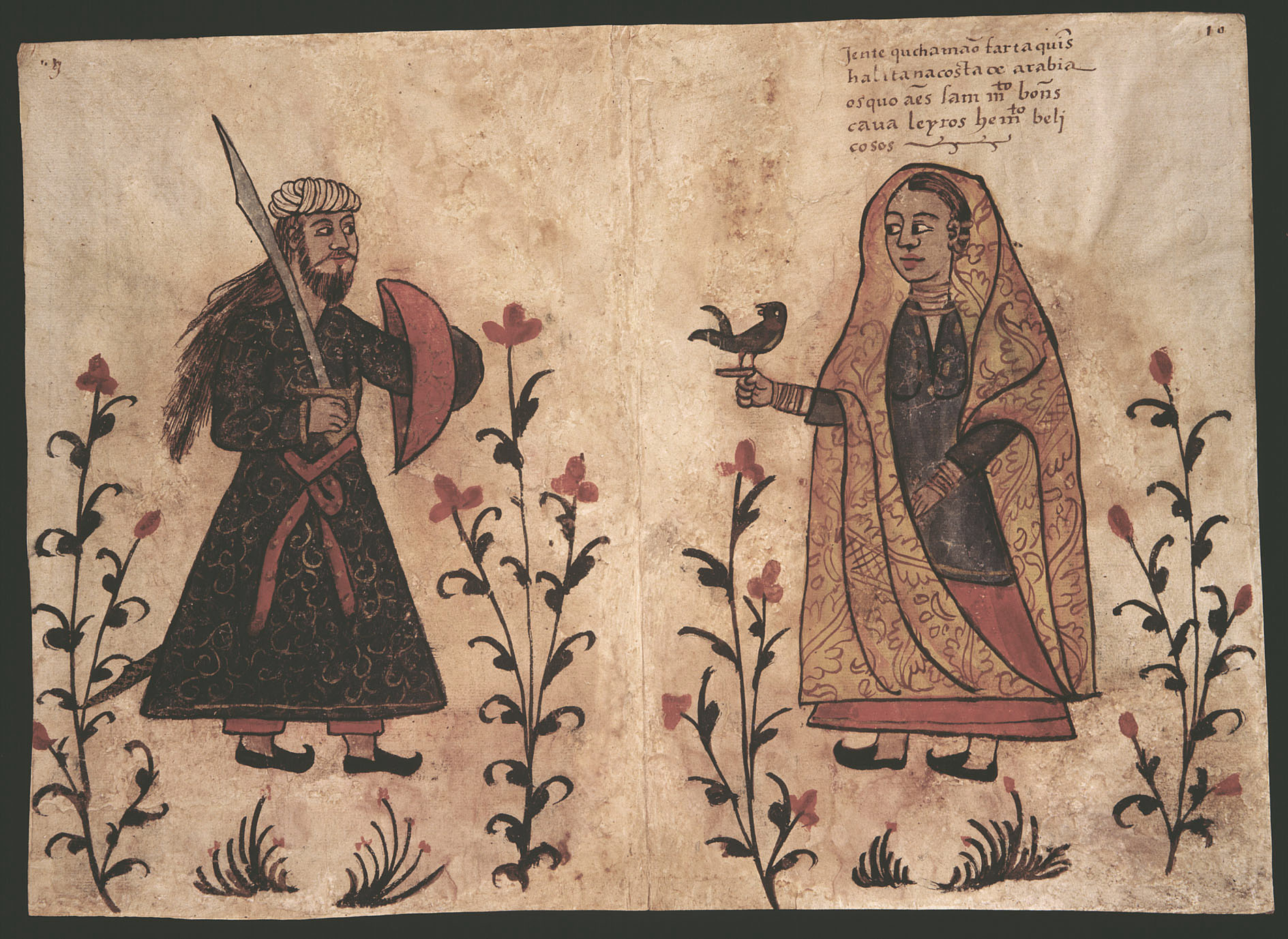
Inhabitants of the Kingdom of Fartakh in the east Arabian coast and Socotra, called Fartaques by the Portuguese

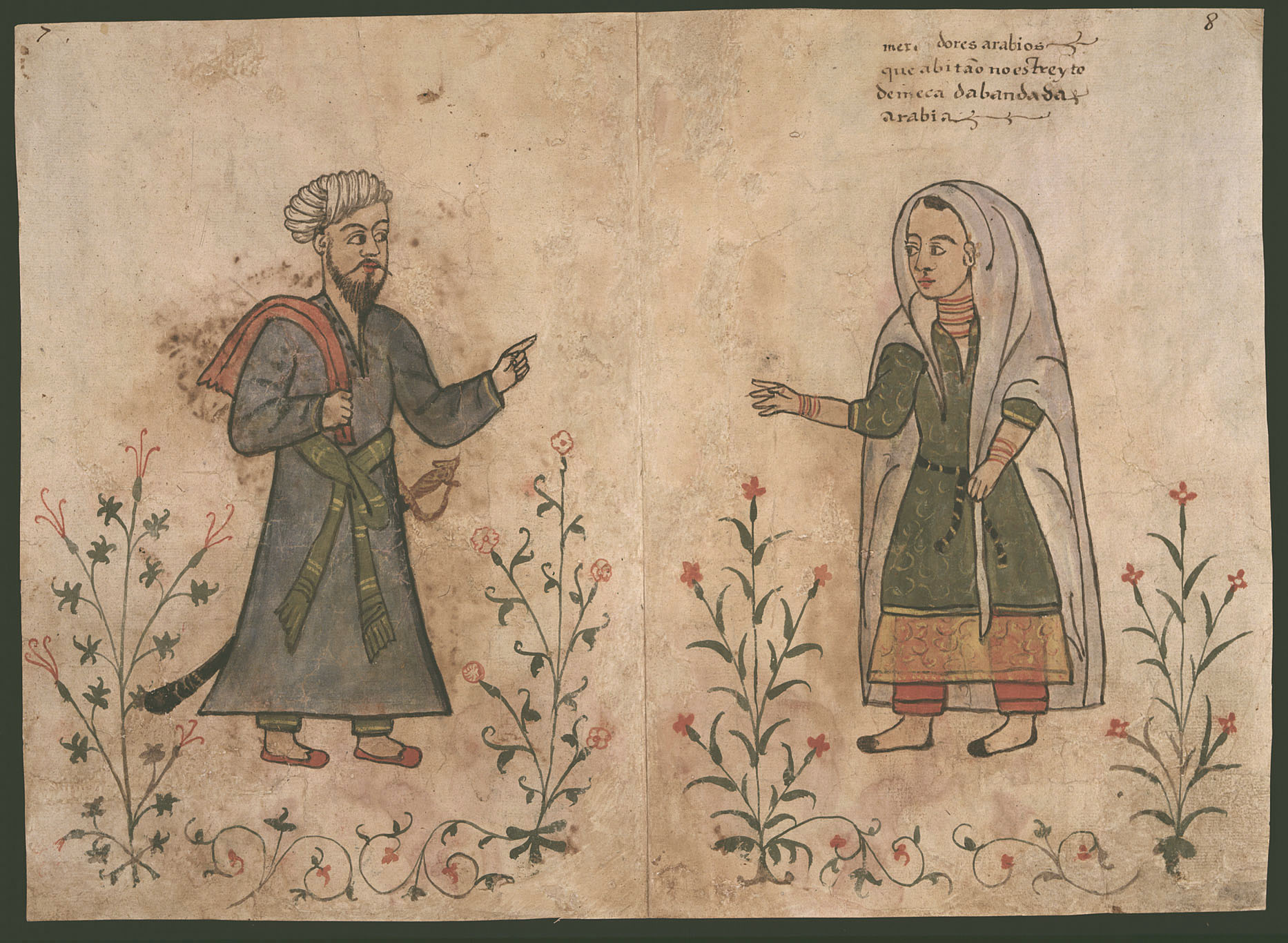
Arabian merchants from the Hejaz

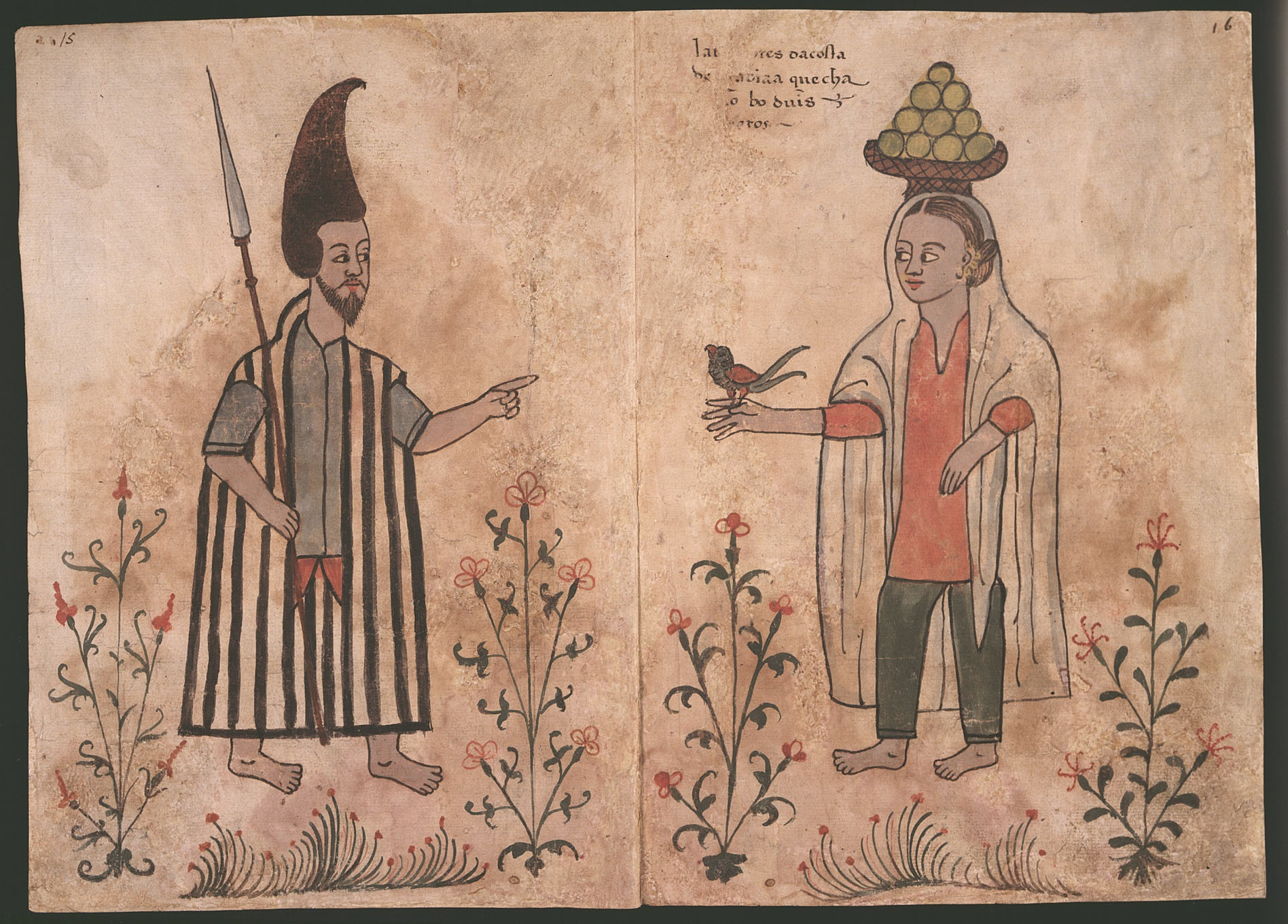
Farmers from southeastern Arabia, possibly Yemen, called Boduis by the Portuguese

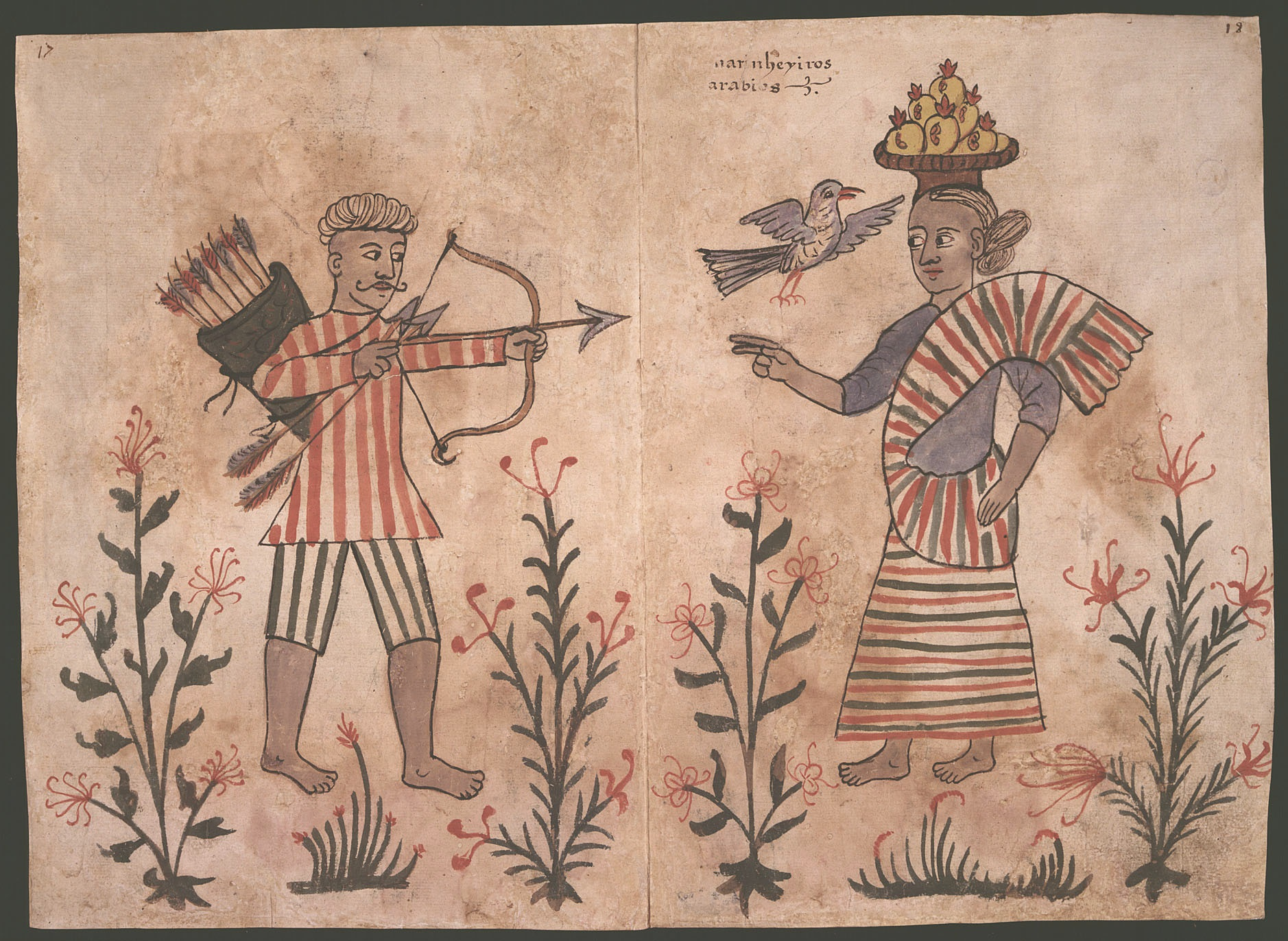
"Sailors" from Arabia, probably fishermen

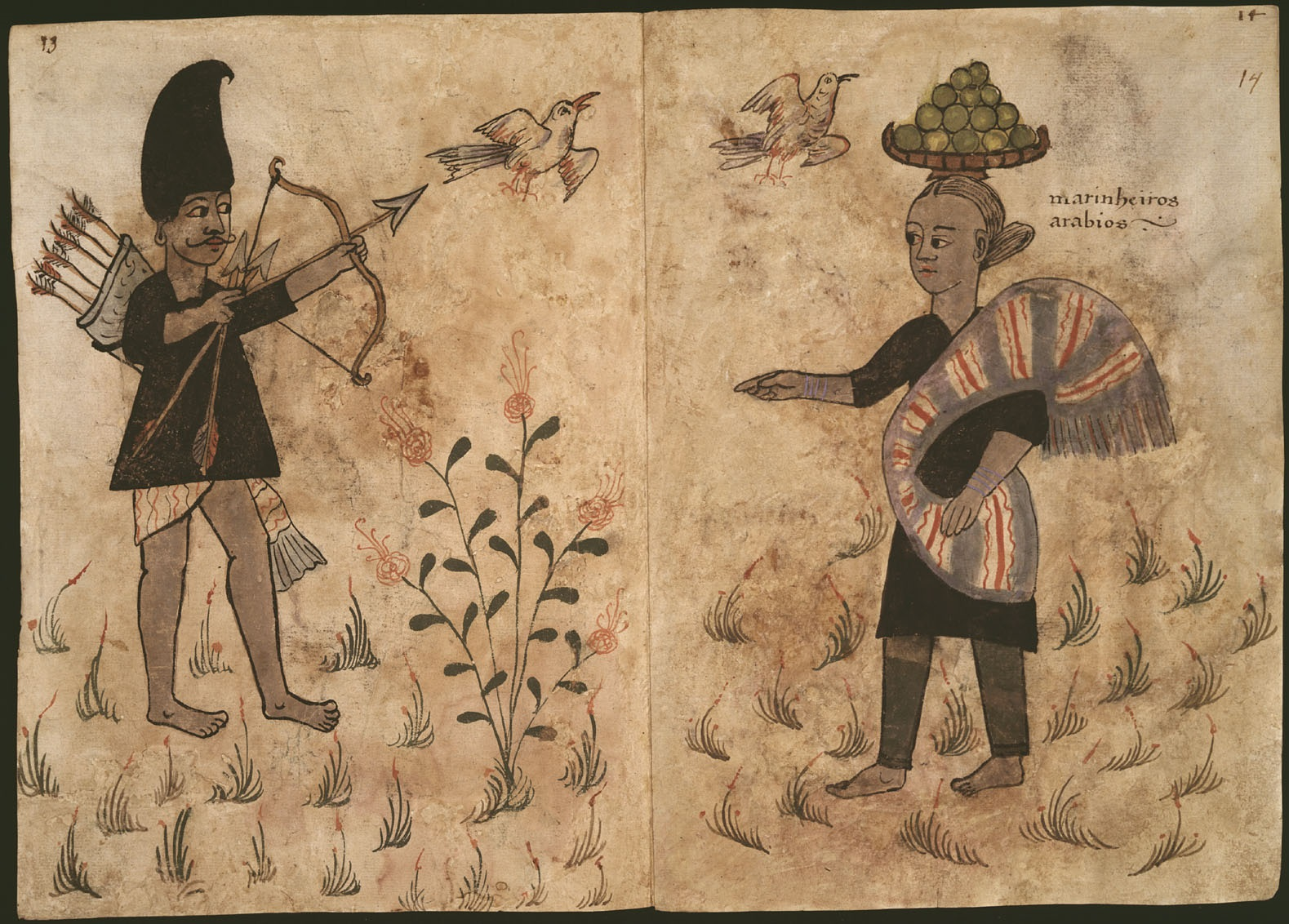
Sailors from Arabia, repetition

==== Mesopotamia ====
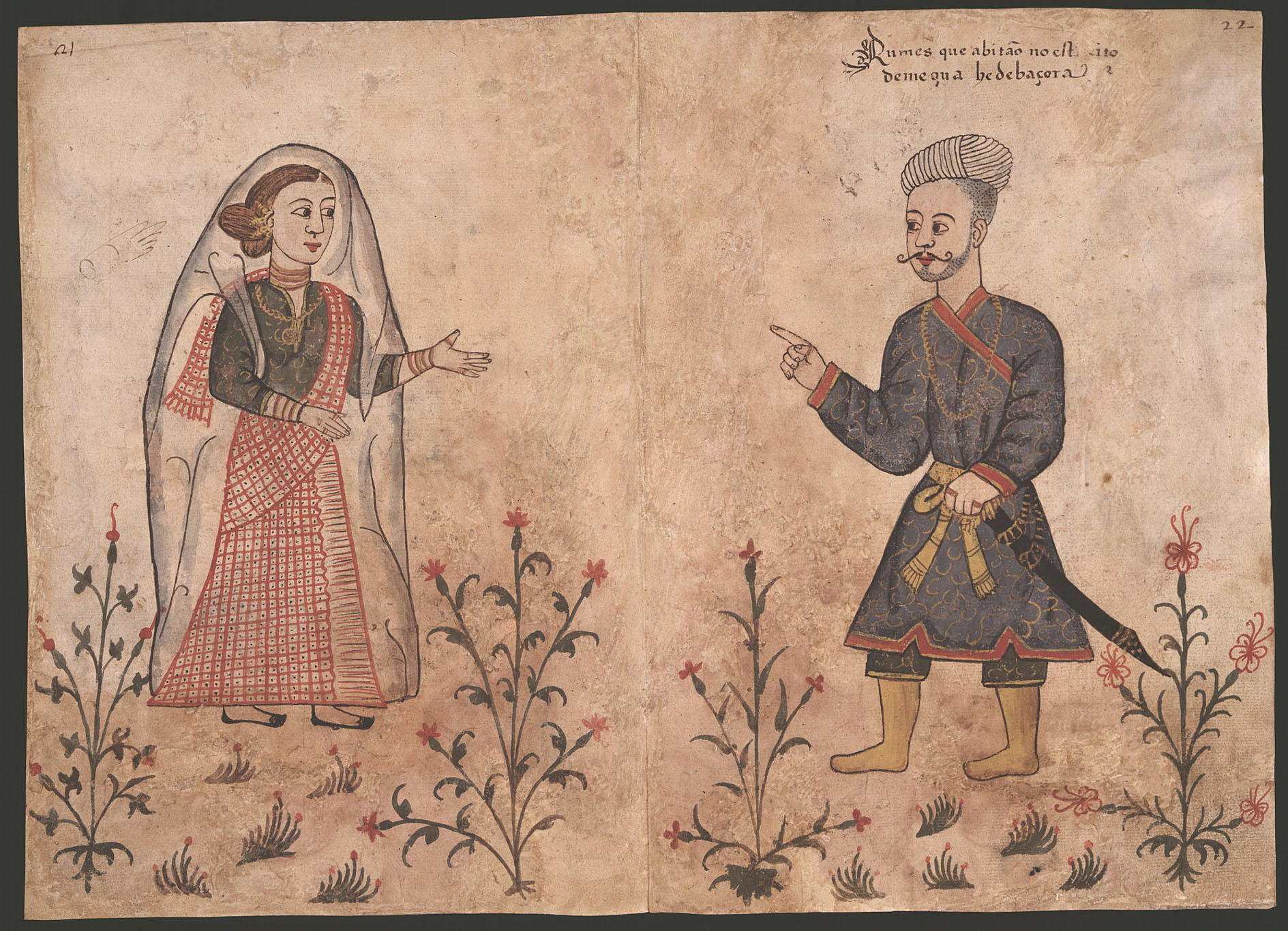
"Rumes" (Turks) that inhabit the Red Sea and Basra

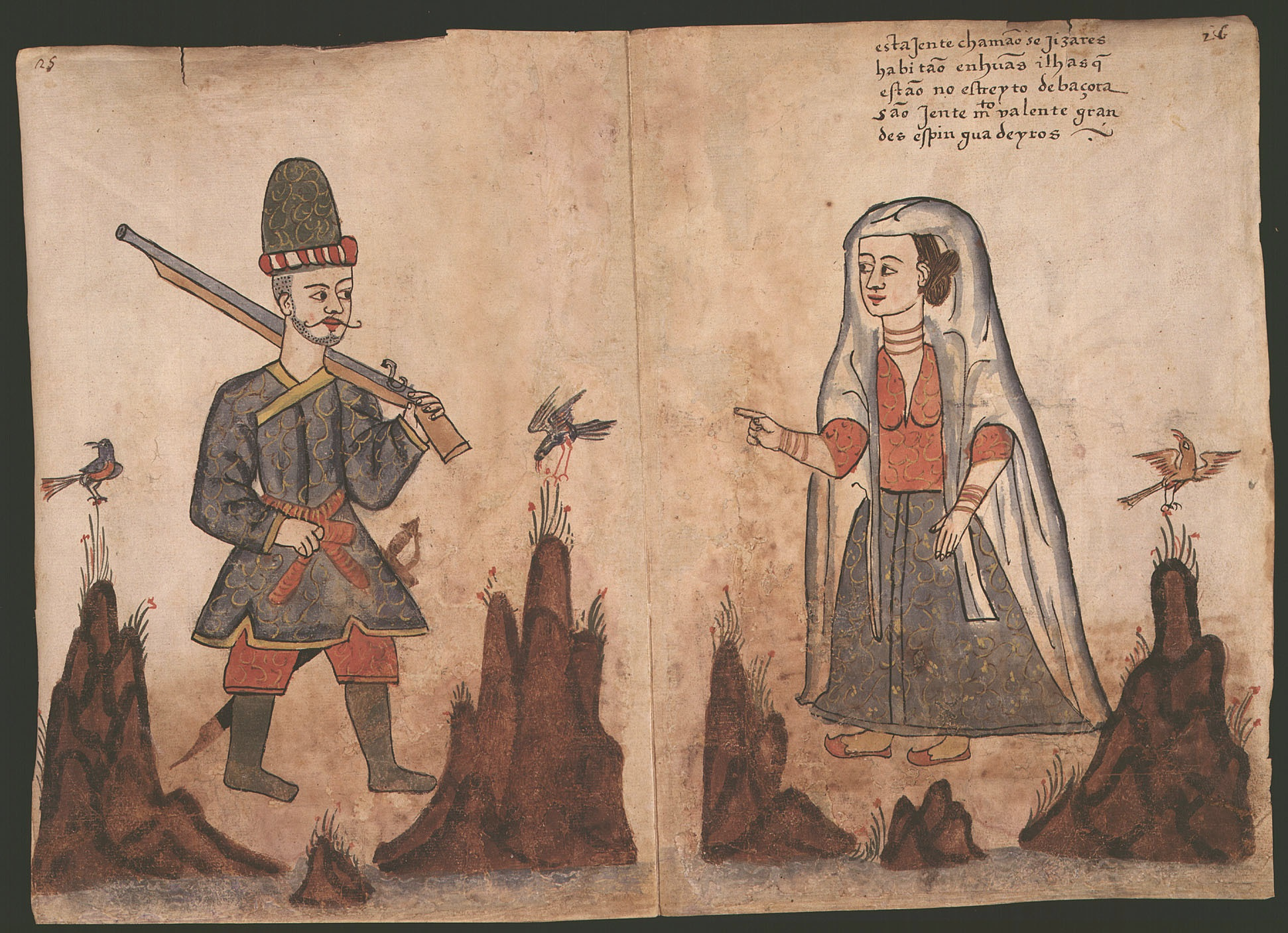
Marsh Arabs

==== Hormuz ====
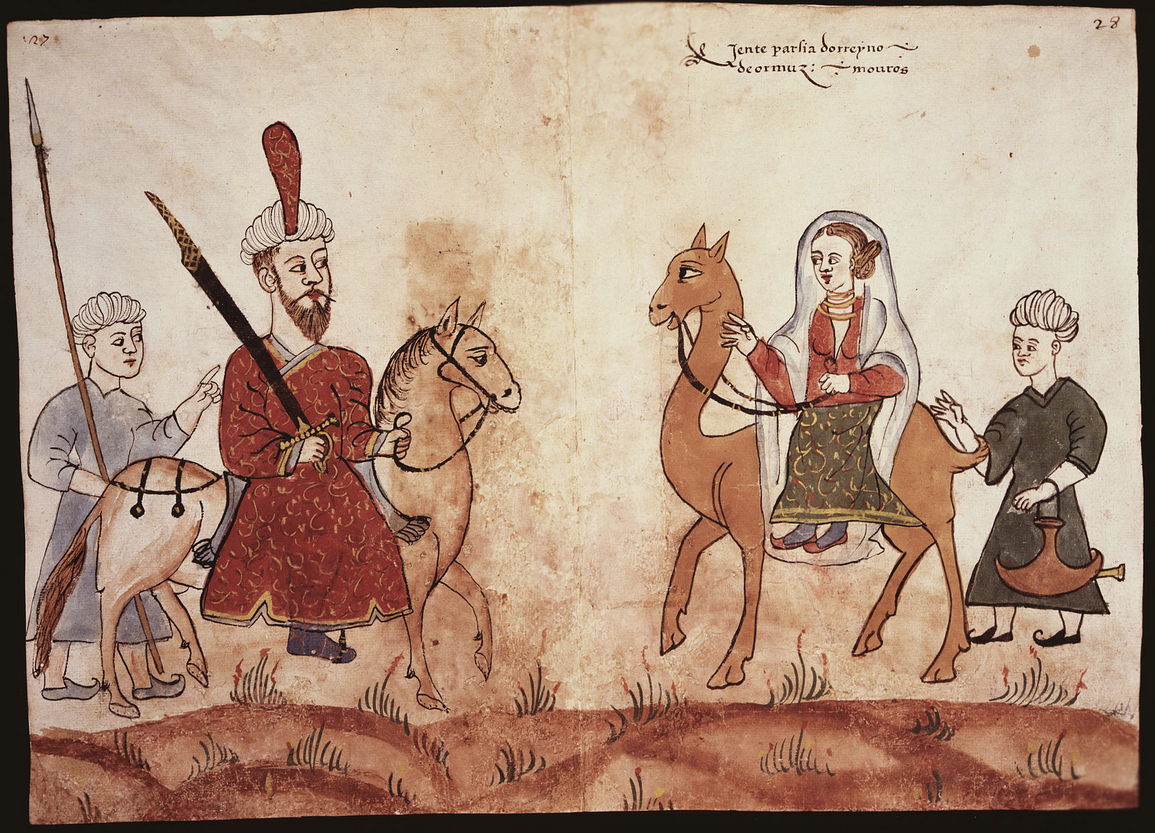
Iranian couple from Hormuz

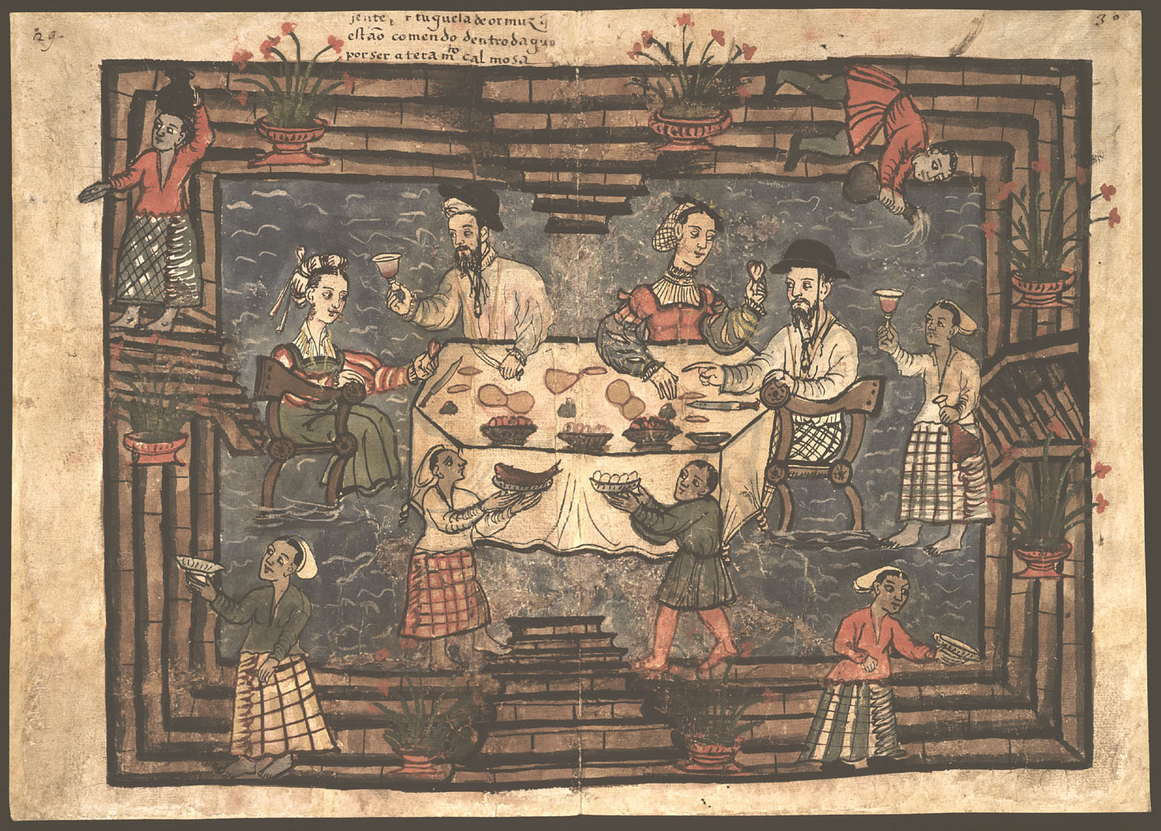
A dinner of Portuguese in Hormuz; the climate was hot enough that people purposely flooded their homes.

==== Persia and Afghanistan ====
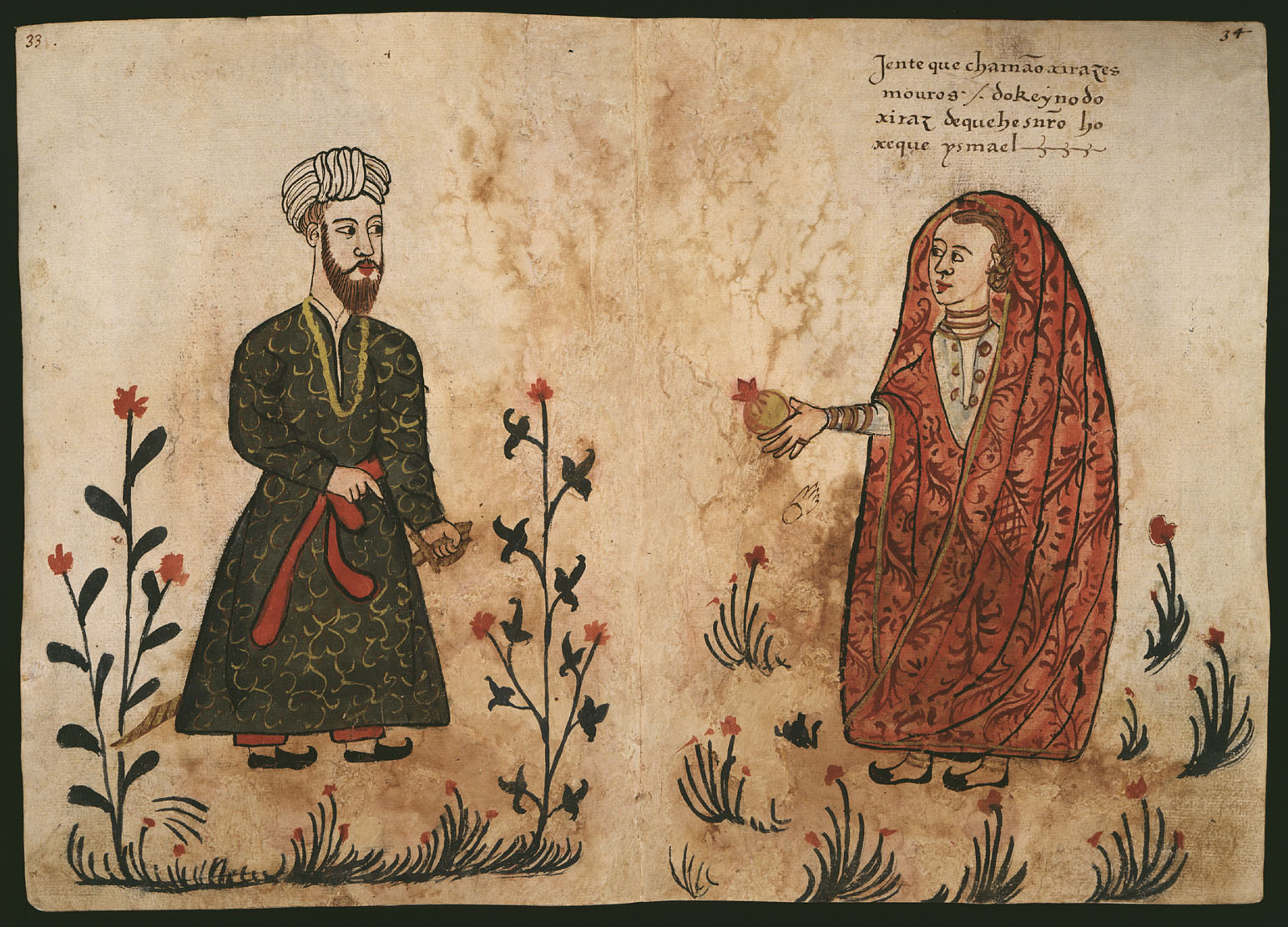
A couple from Shiraz

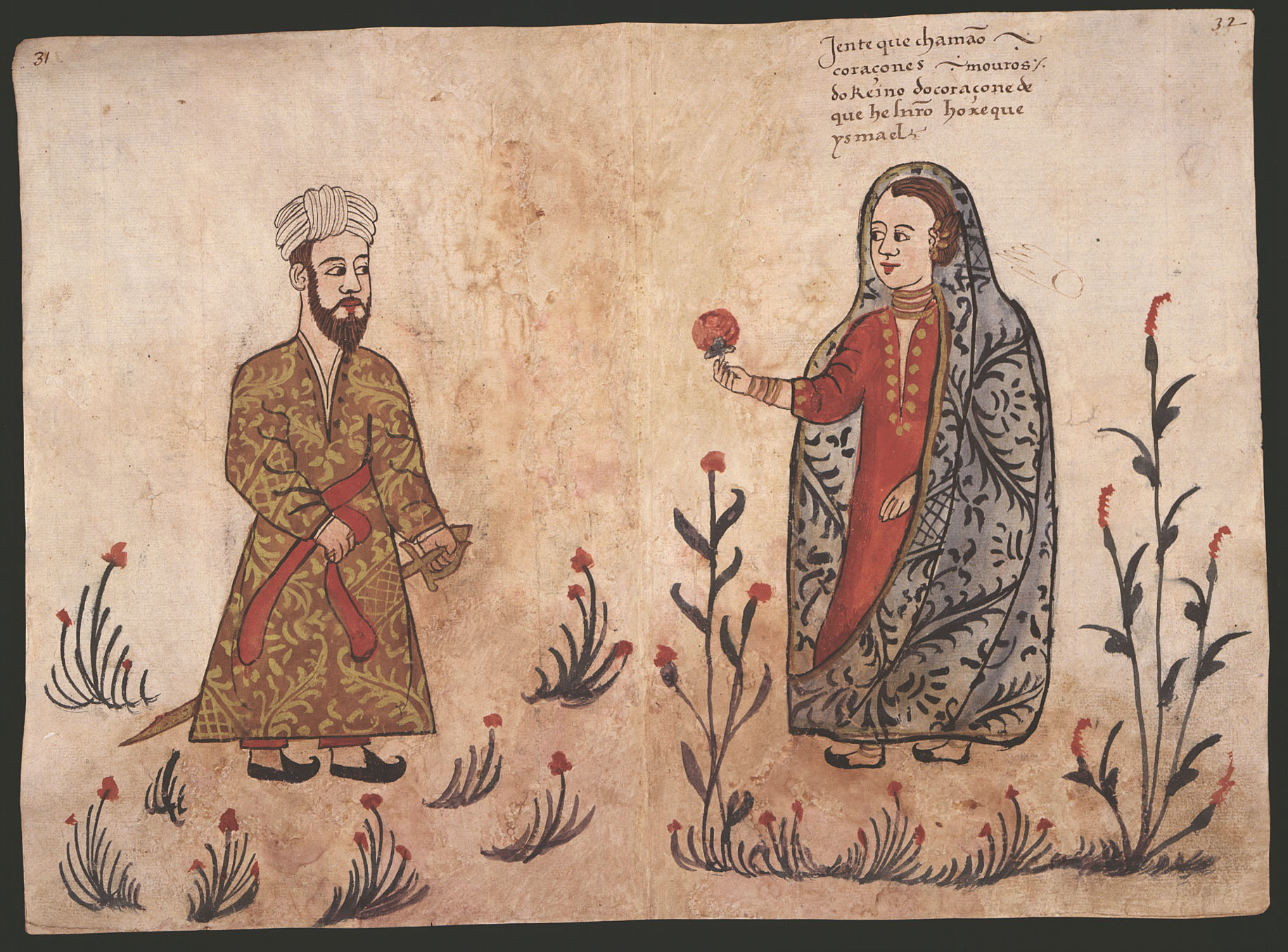
A couple from Khorassan

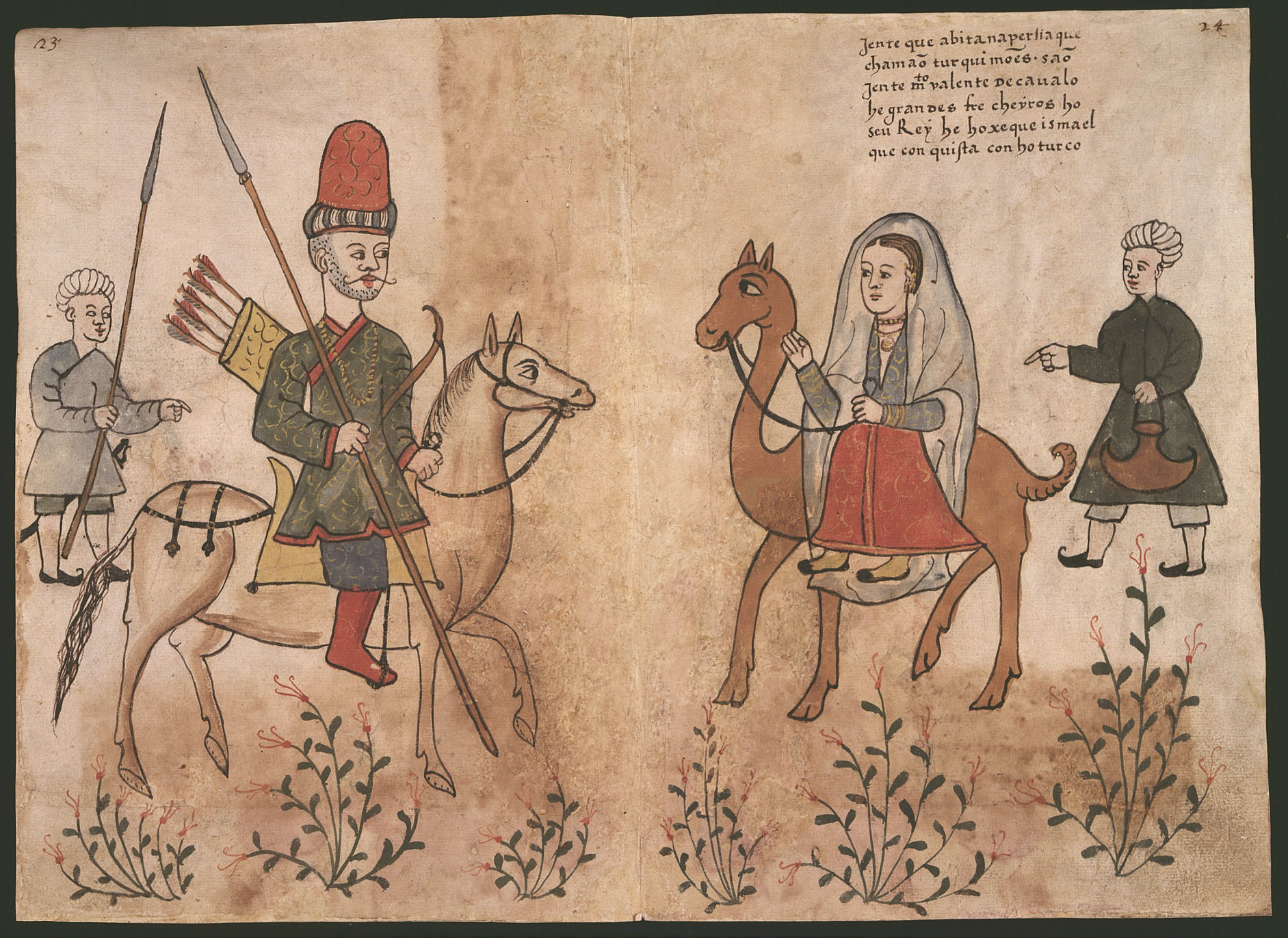
Turkmens from Persia

==== Balochistan ====
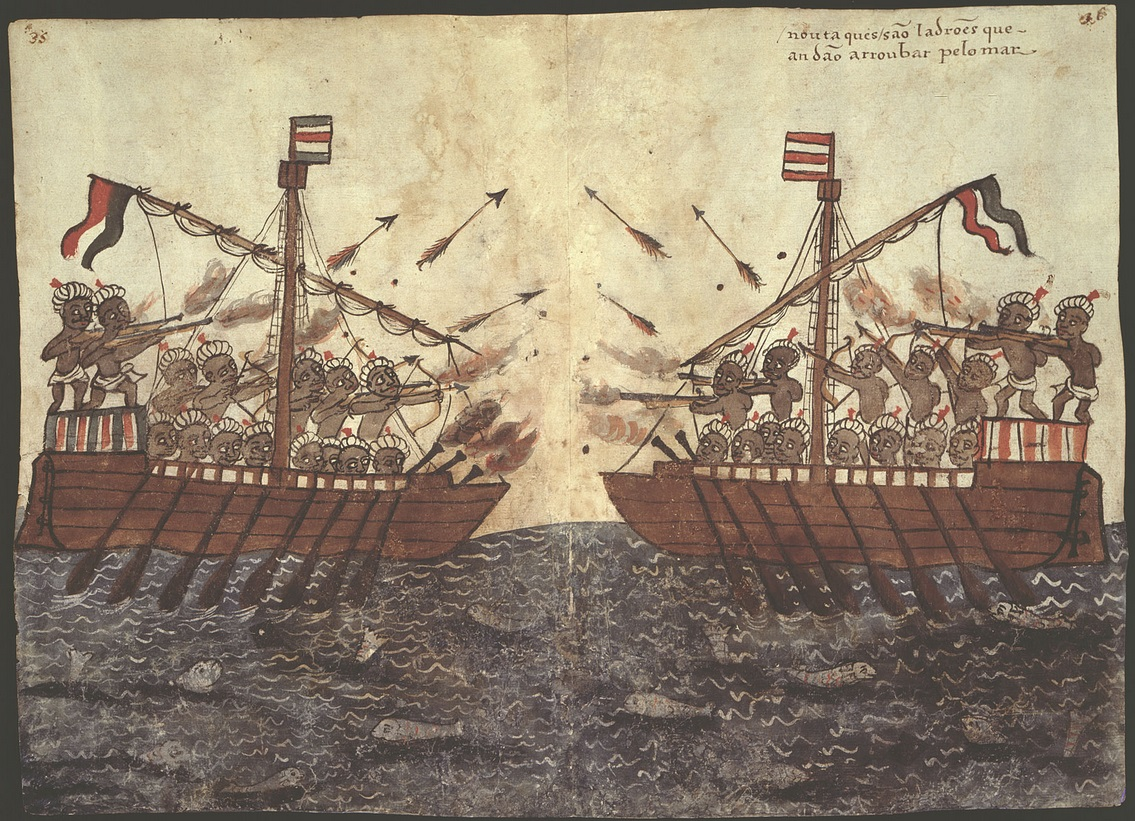
Nautaques, Baloch fishermen who also attacked trade ships

=== South Asia ===
==== Sindh ====
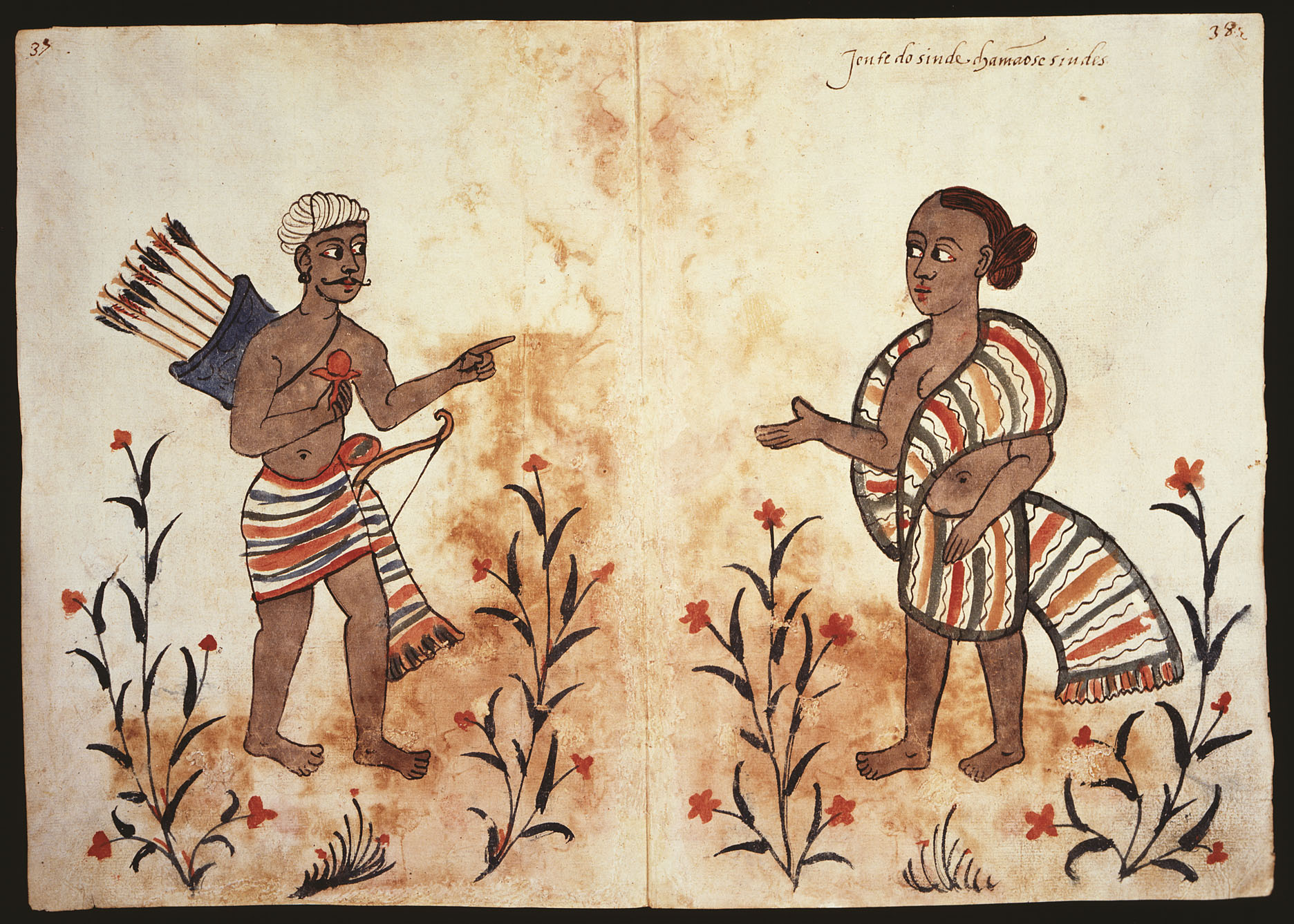
Sindhis

==== Gujarat ====
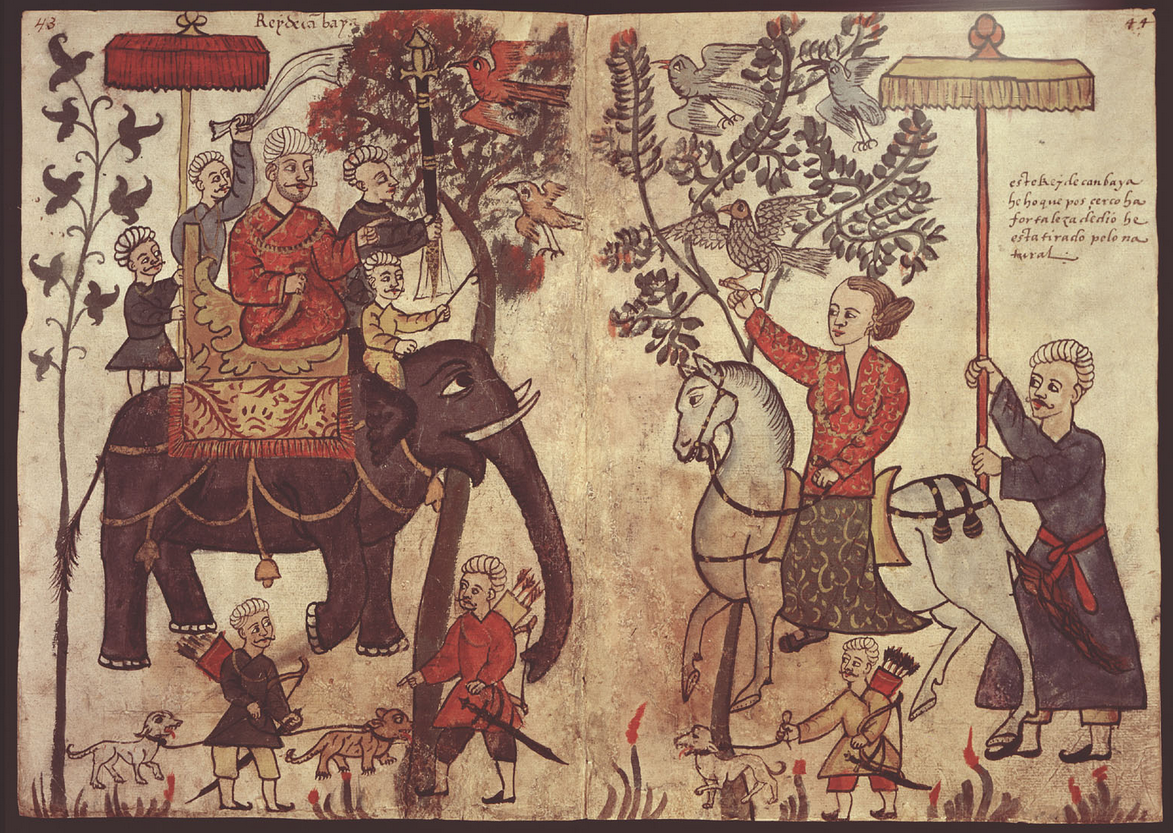
"King of Cambay", the Sultan of Gujarat

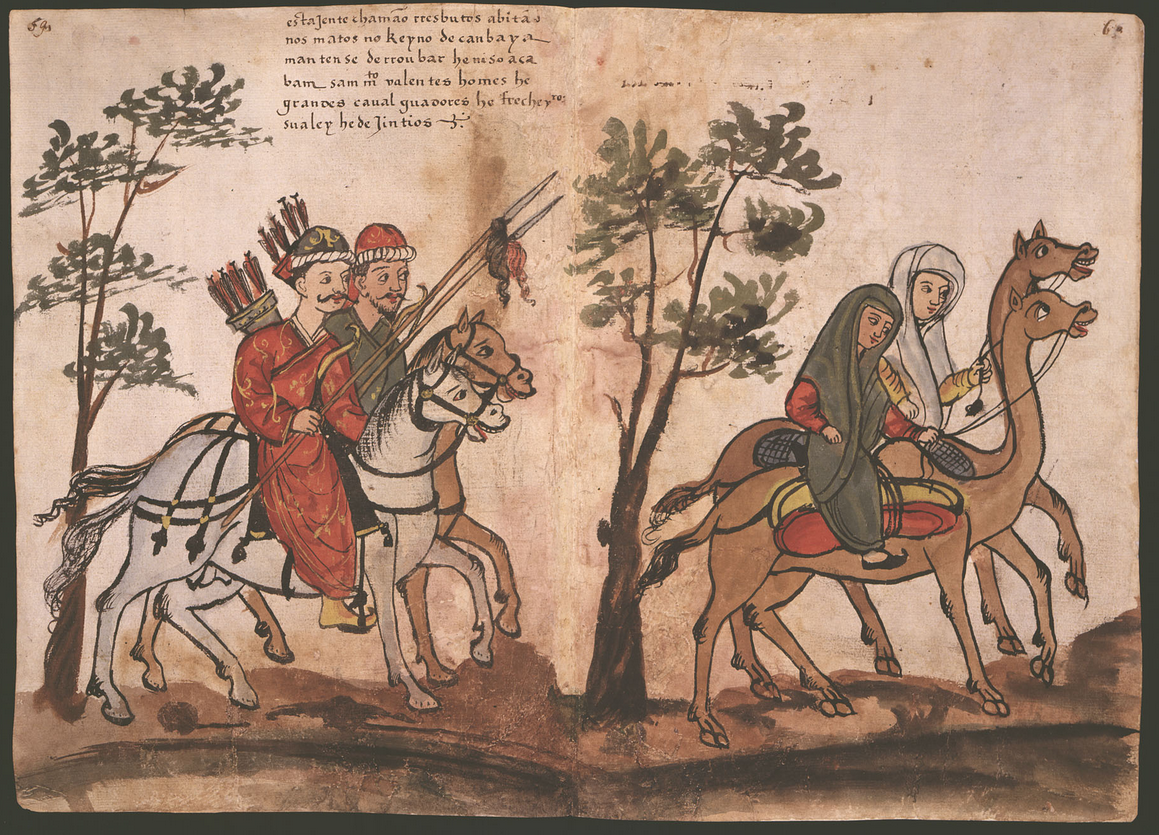
Rajputs, "who inhabit the backwoods of Cambay"

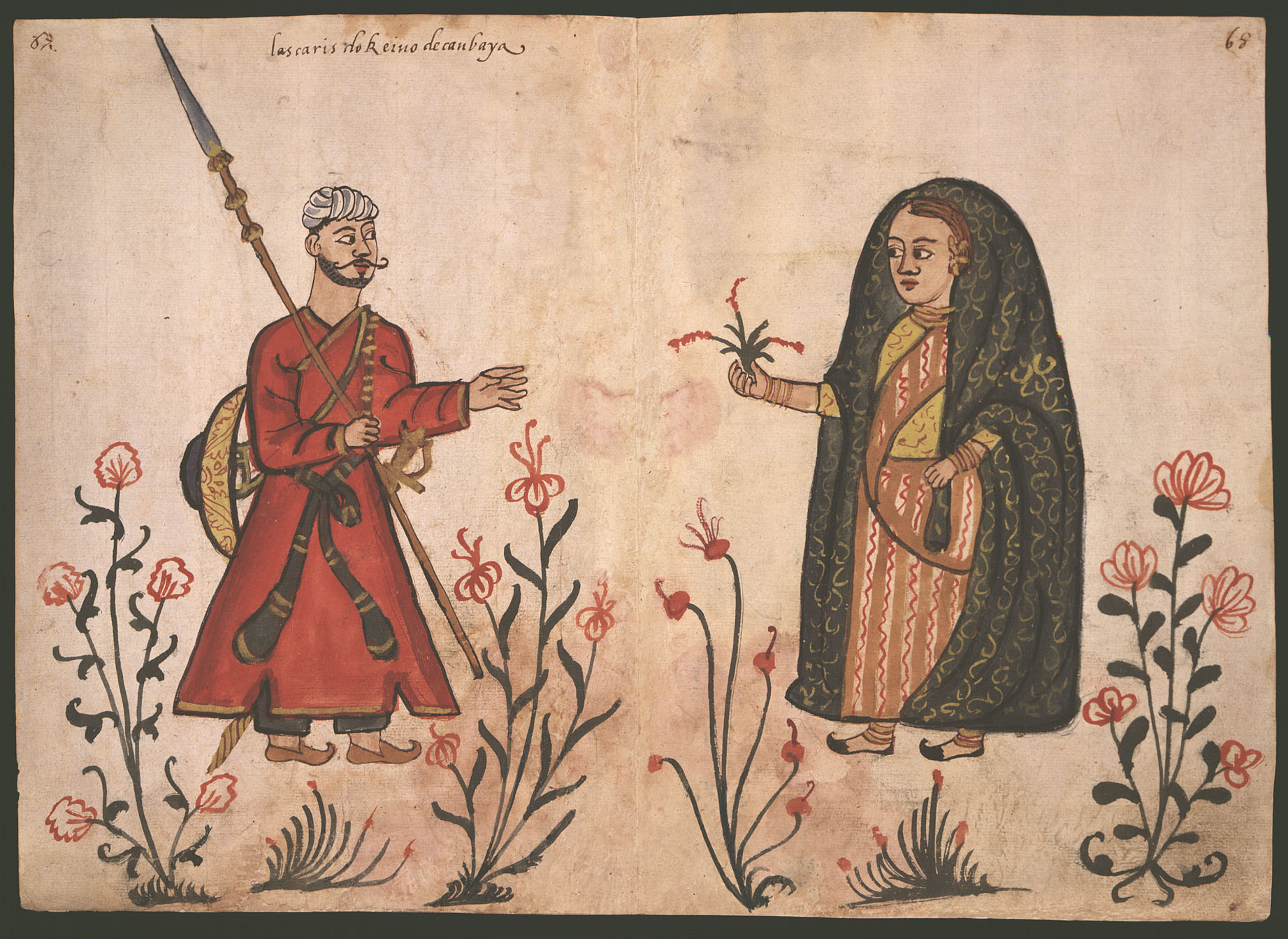
Gujarati couple of a lascarin (foot soldier) and his wife

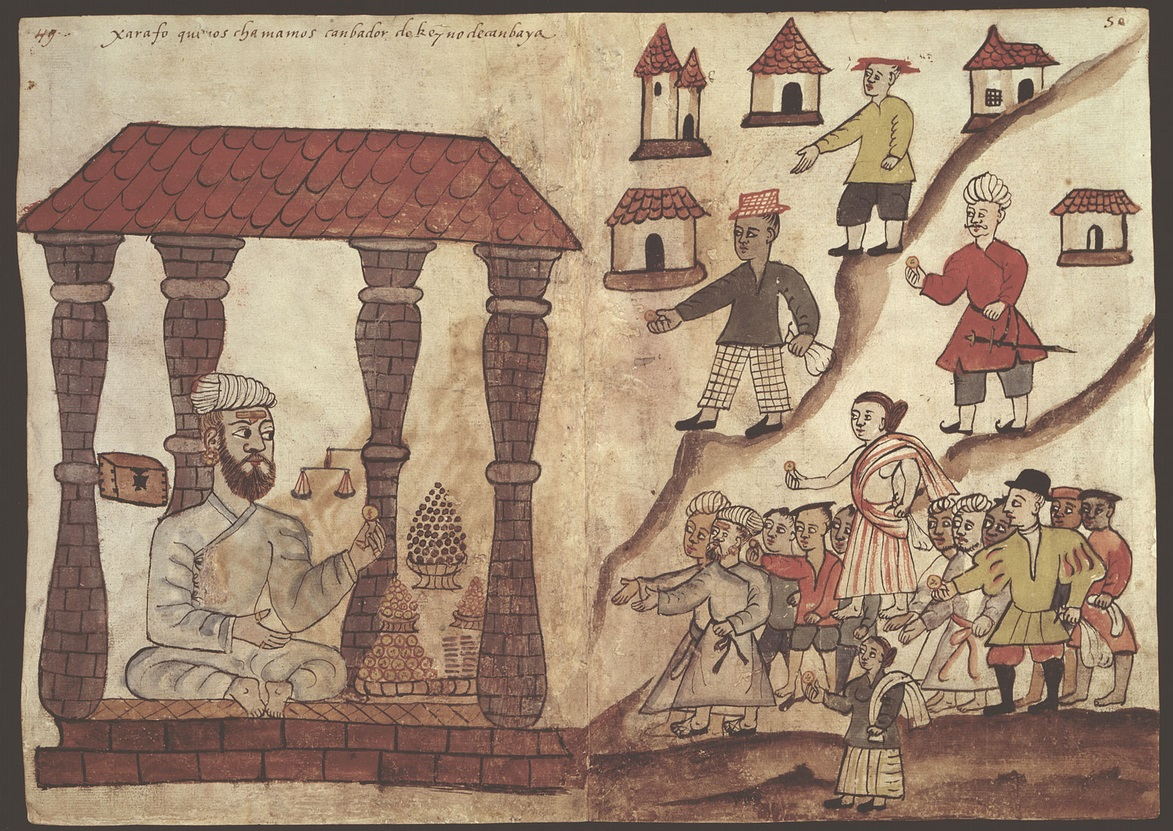
Money changer of Gujarat

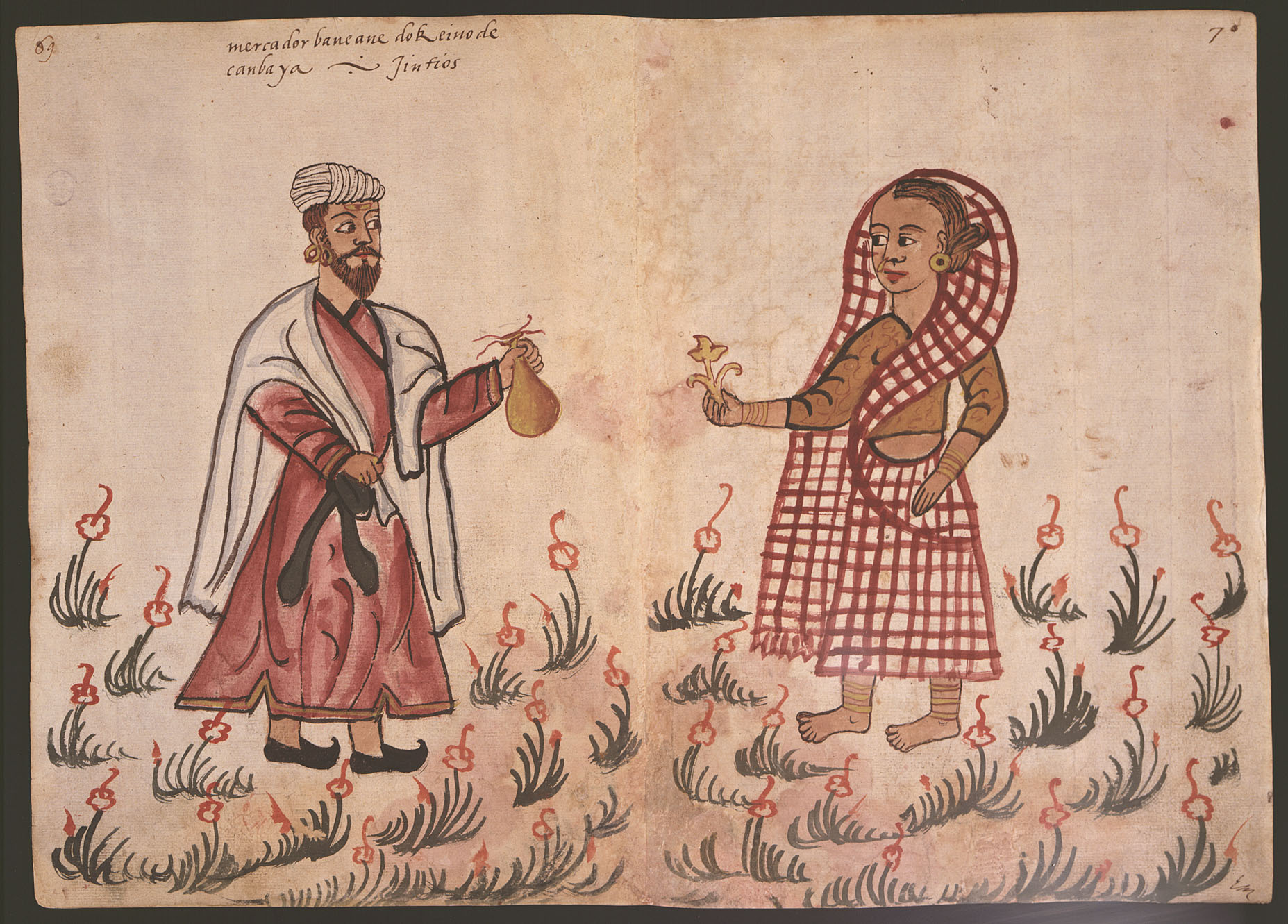
Merchants of Gujarat

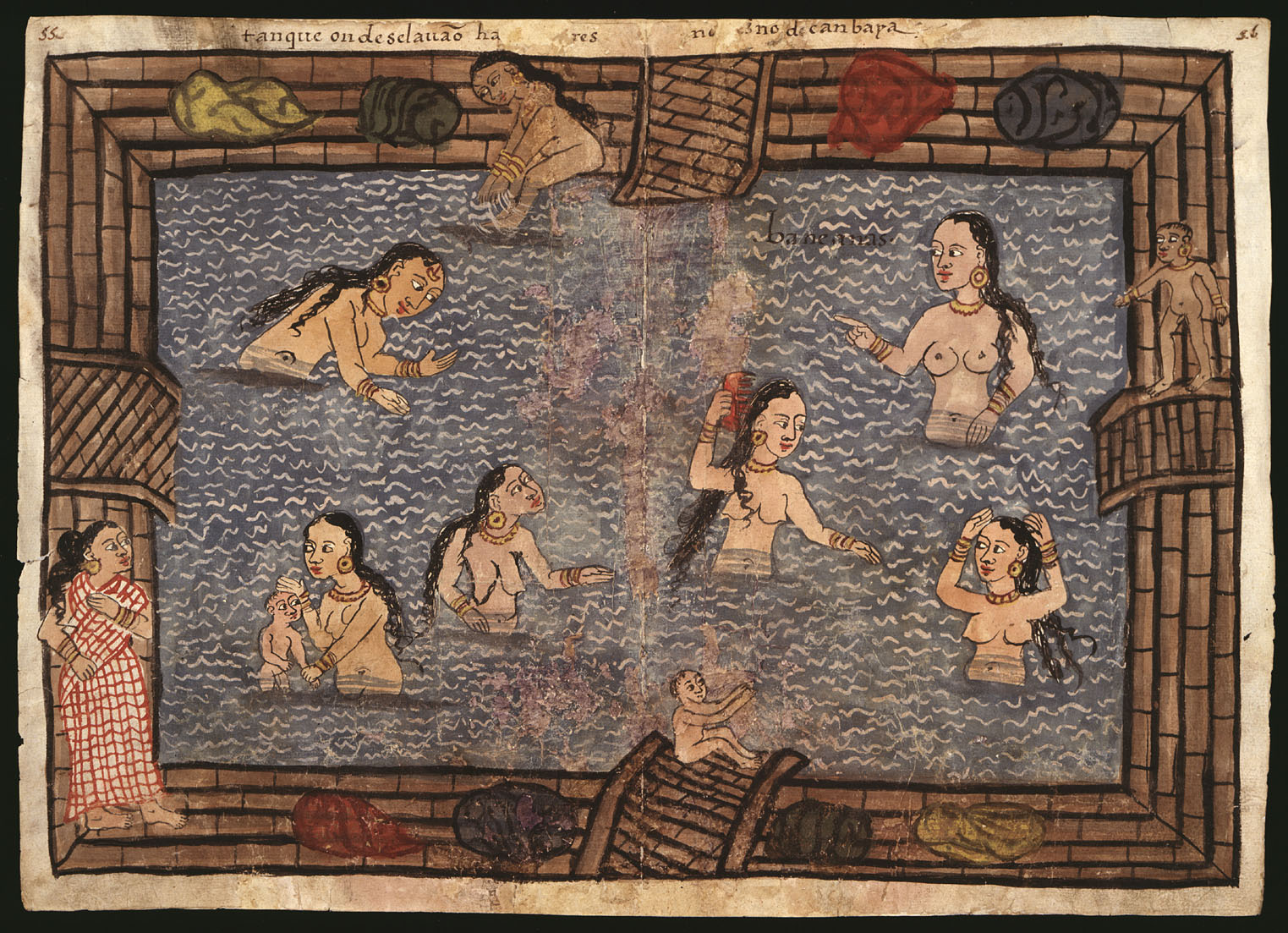
Water tank in Gujarat

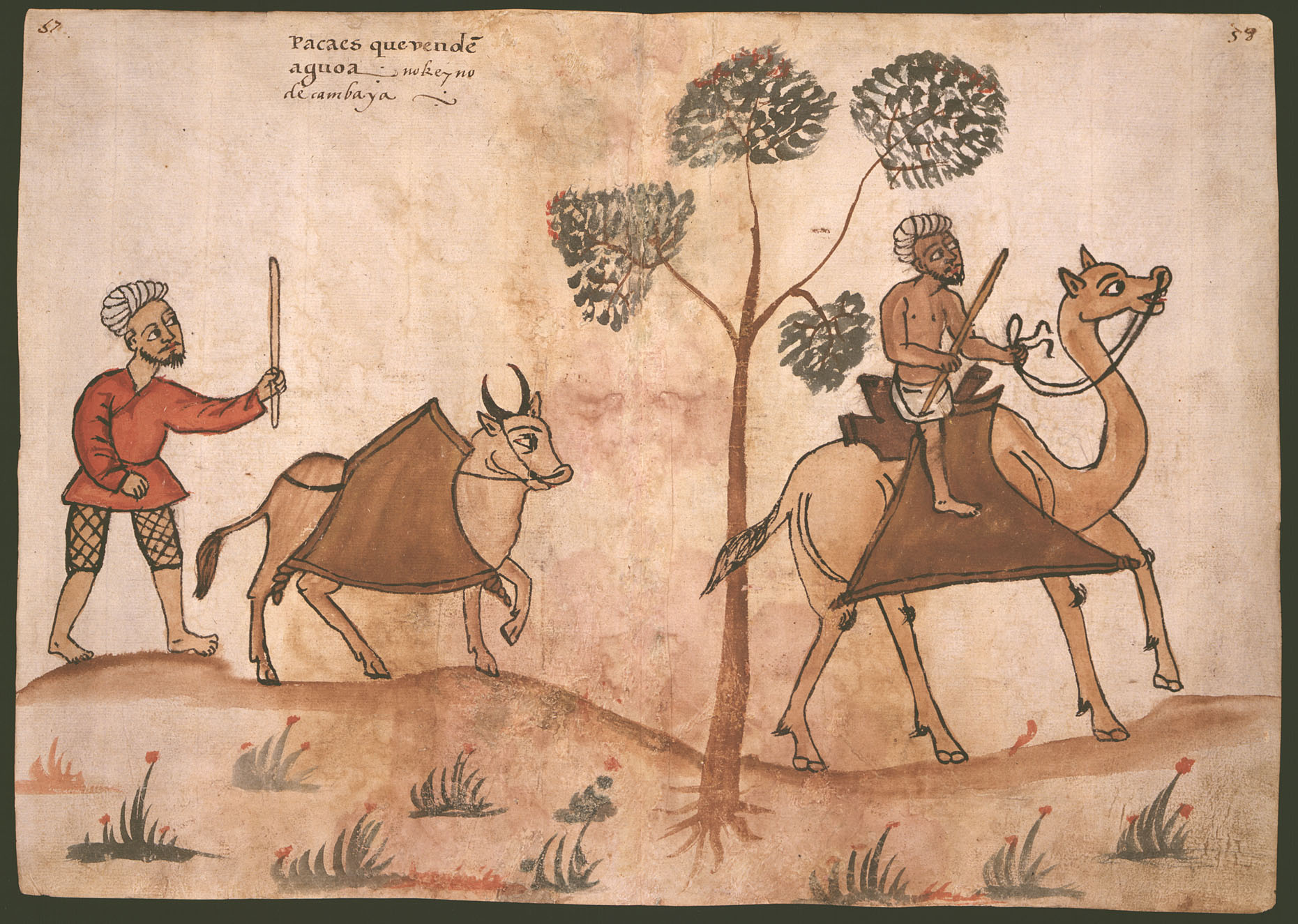
Water sellers of Gujarat

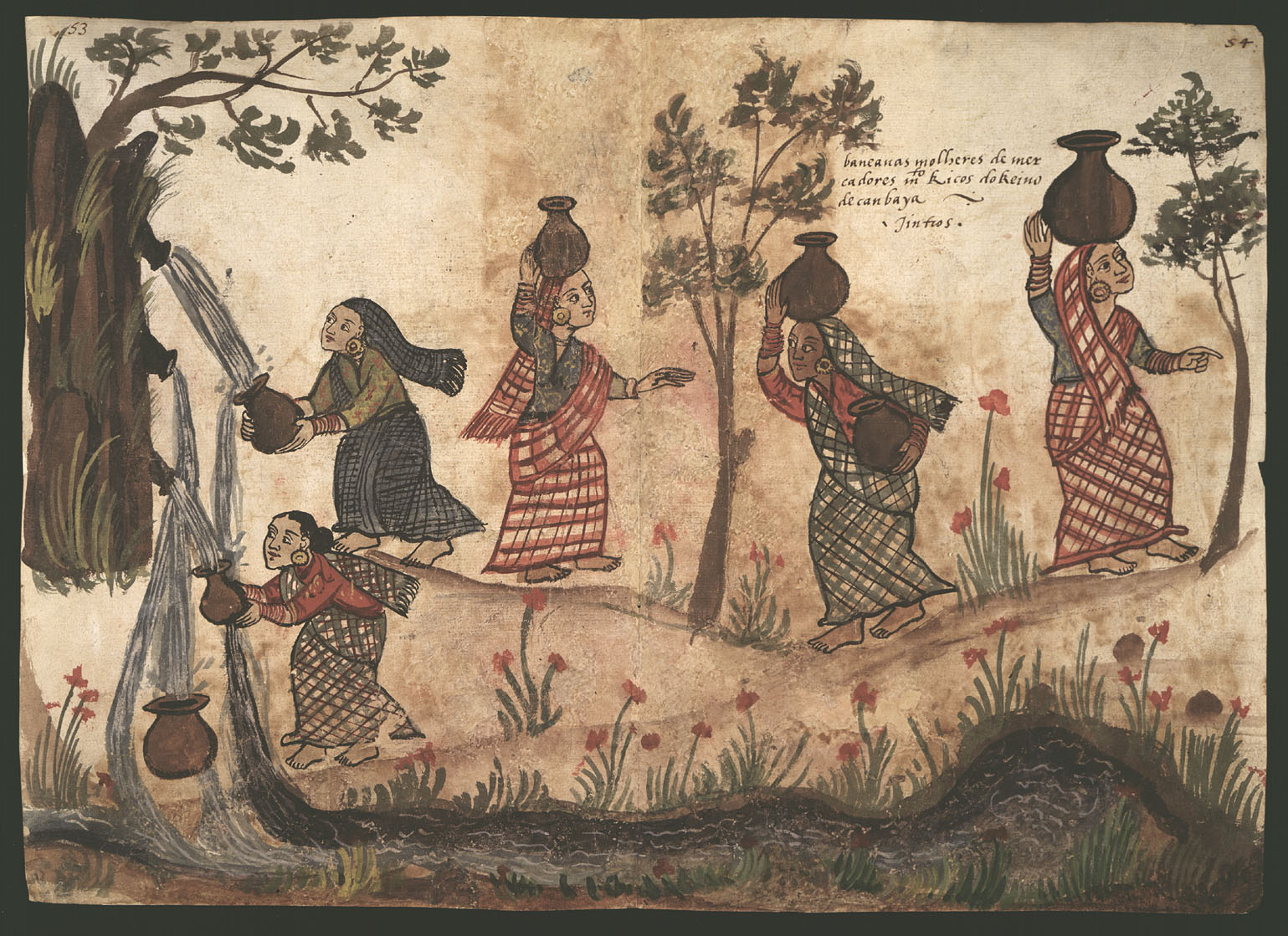
Gujarati women

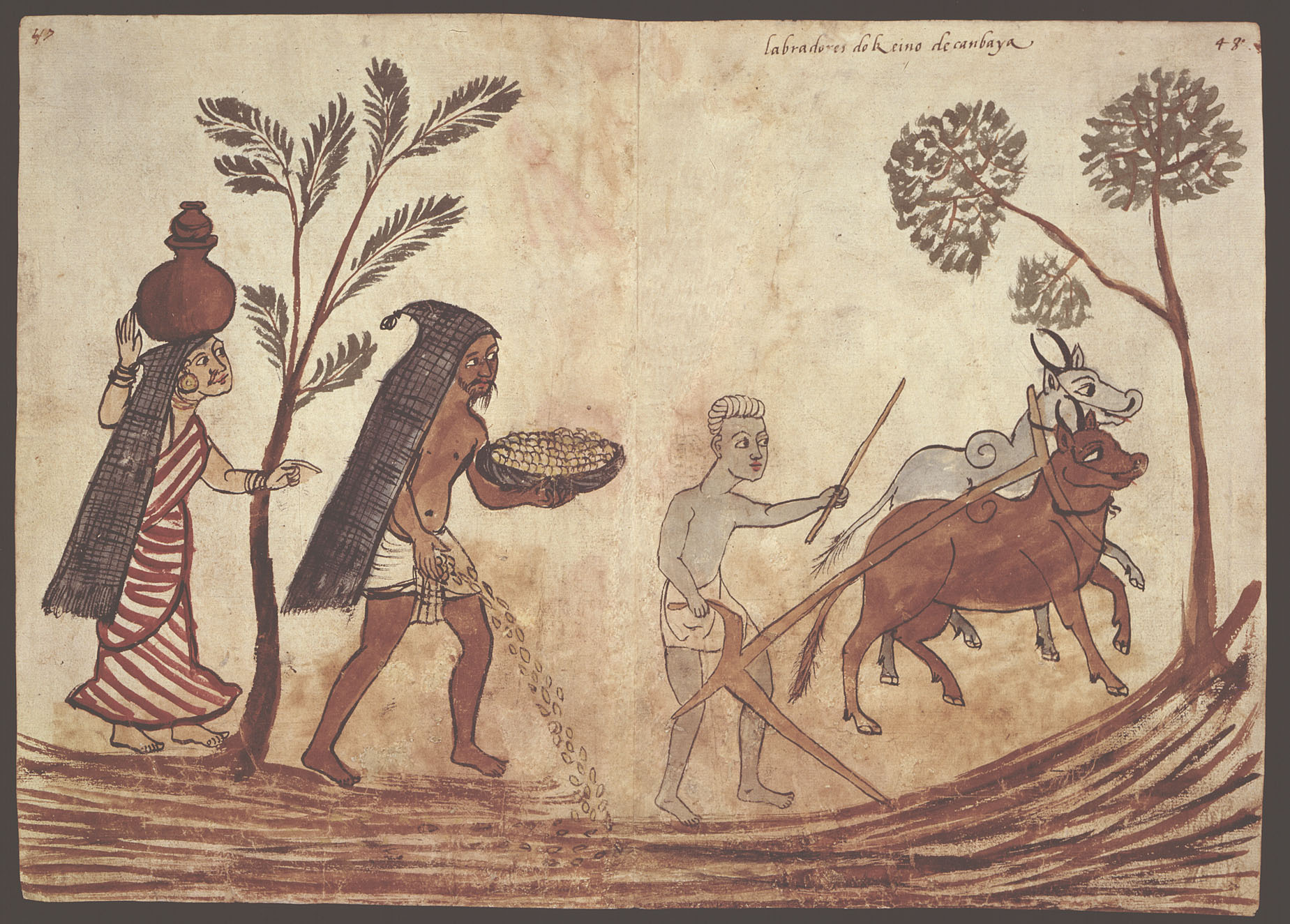
Farmers and land workers of Gujarat

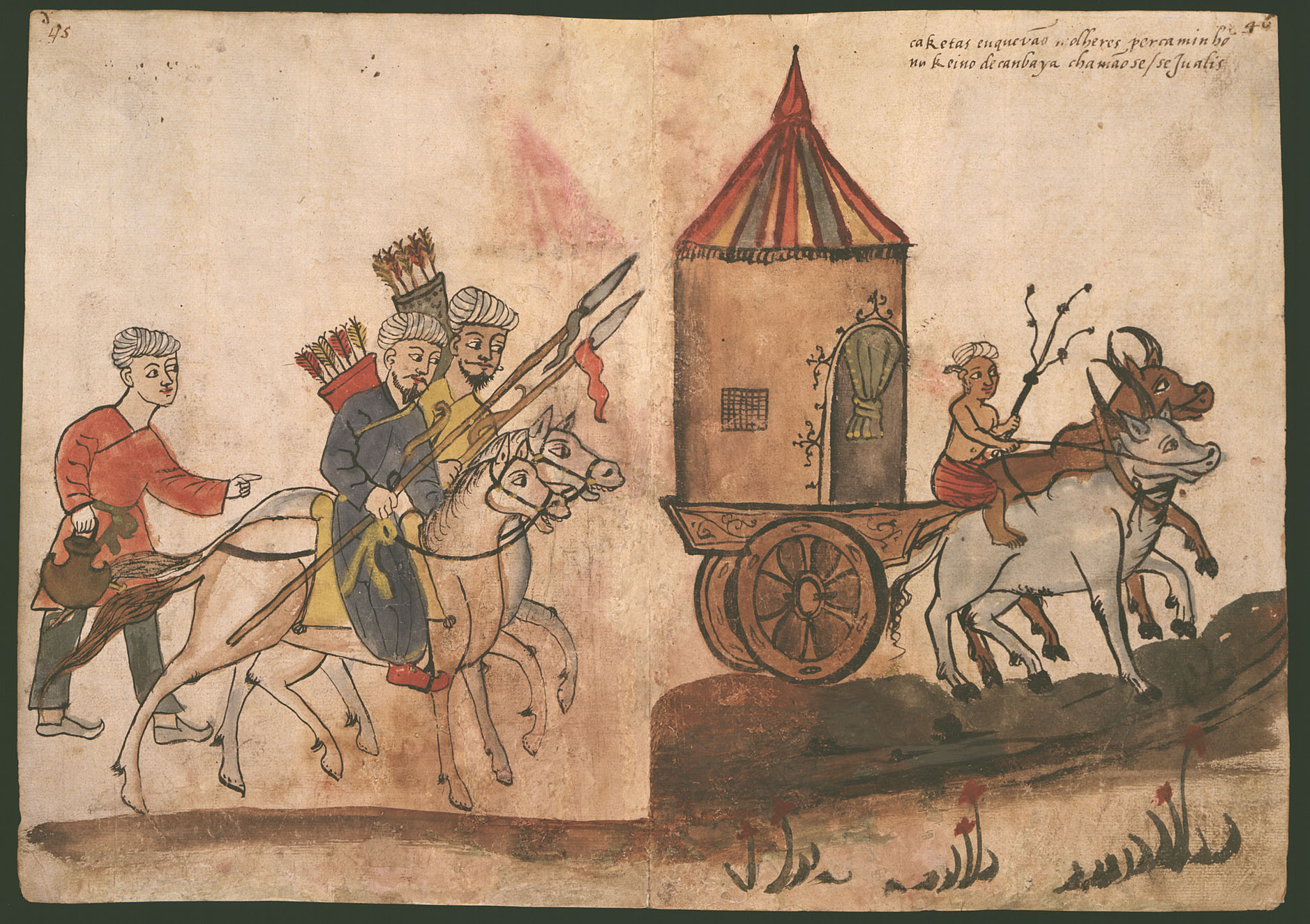
Carriage of Gujarat

==== Northern and Northeastern India ====
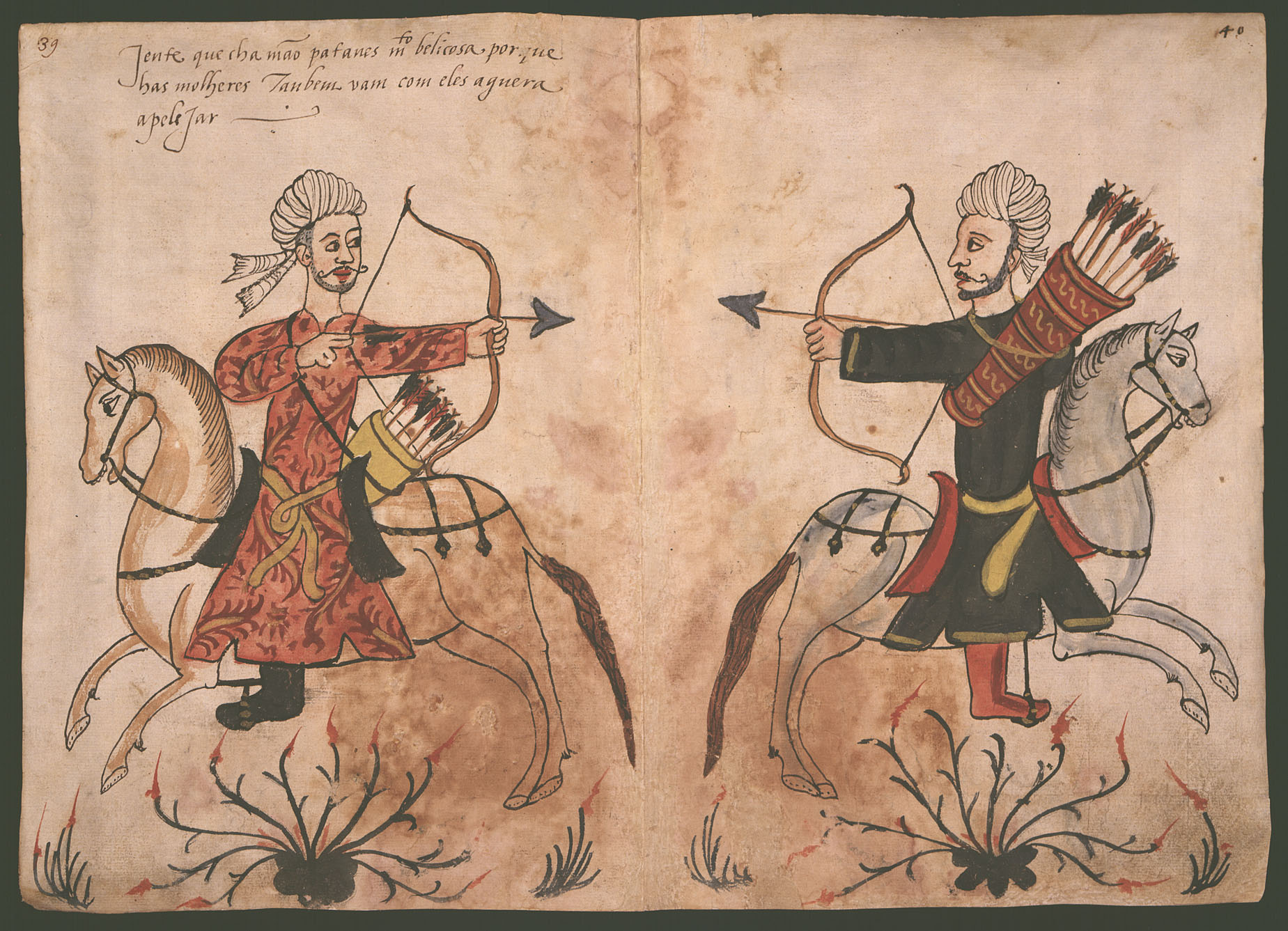
Pashtun Horse Archers

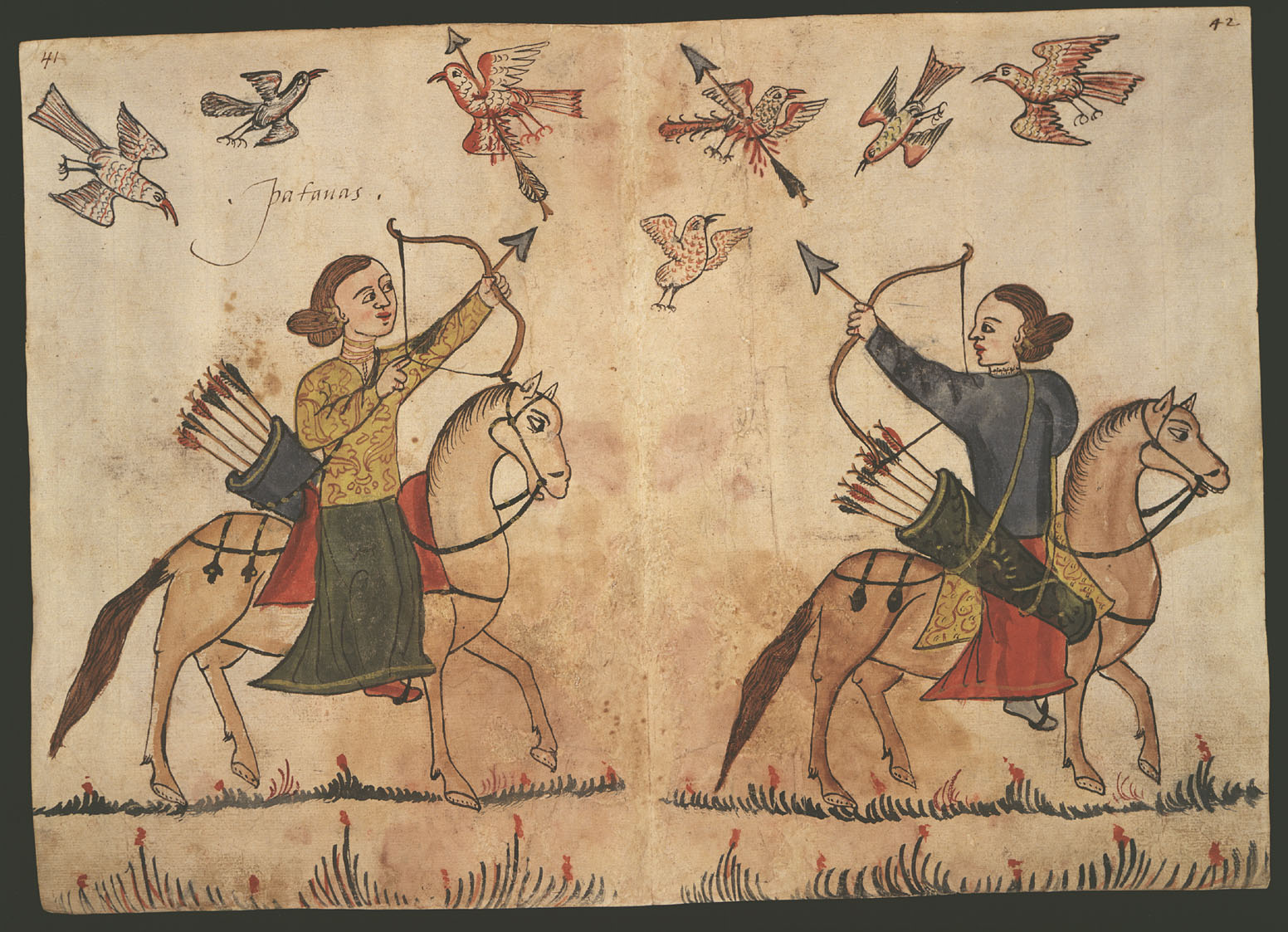
Pashtun Horse Archers

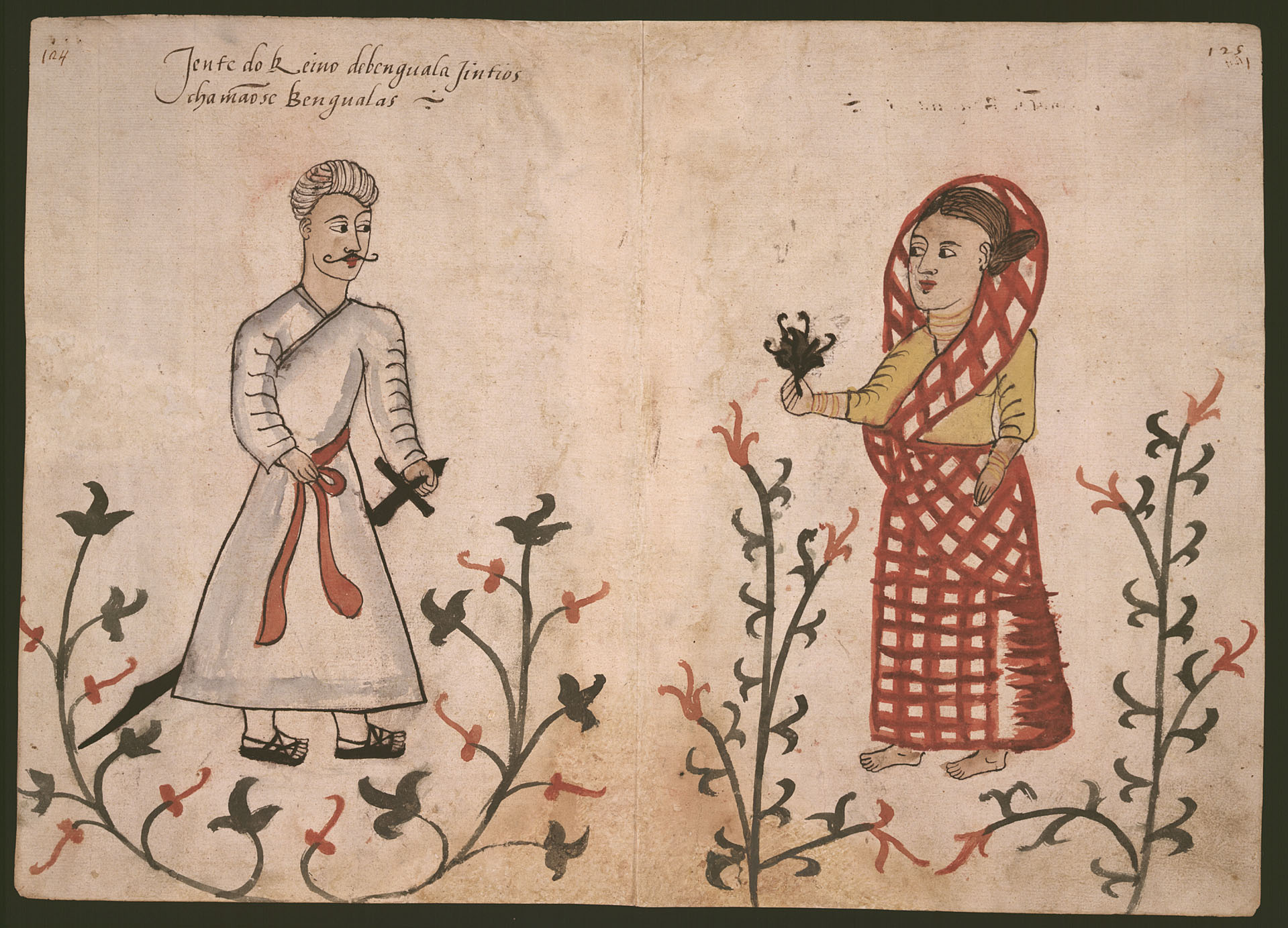
Bengalis

==== Goa and the Kanara Coast ====
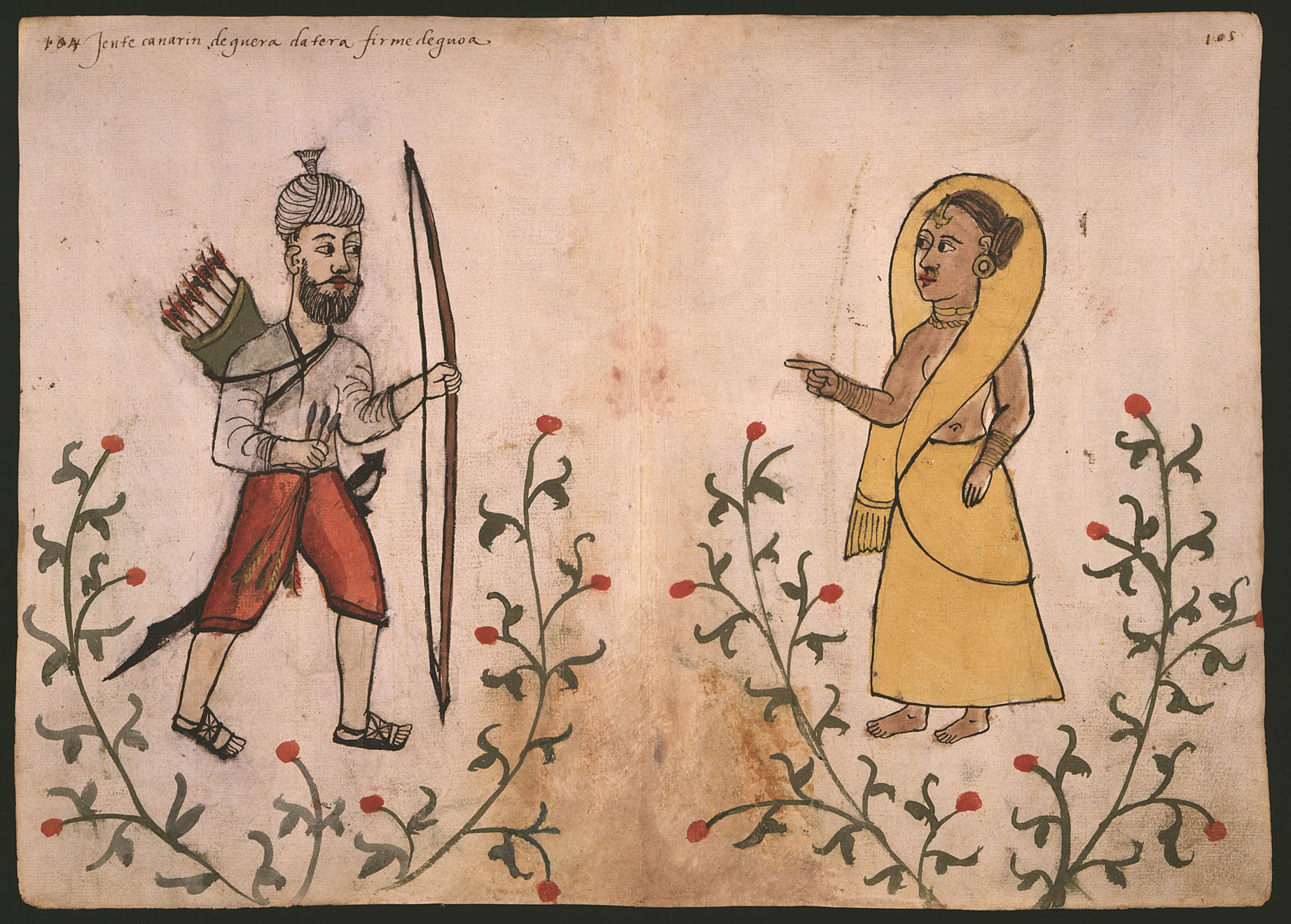
Goan footsoldier, who were known to use longbows

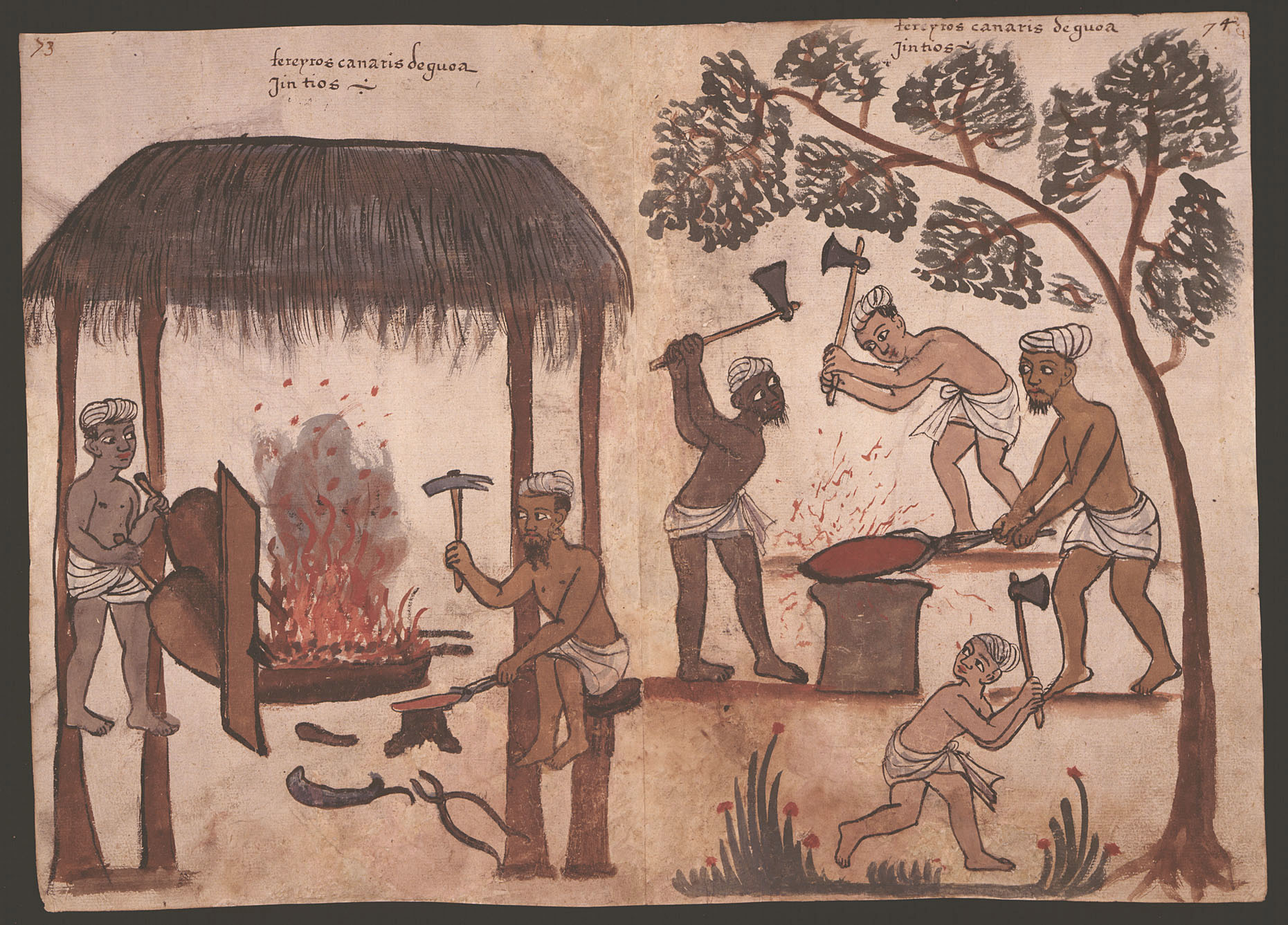
Goan blacksmiths

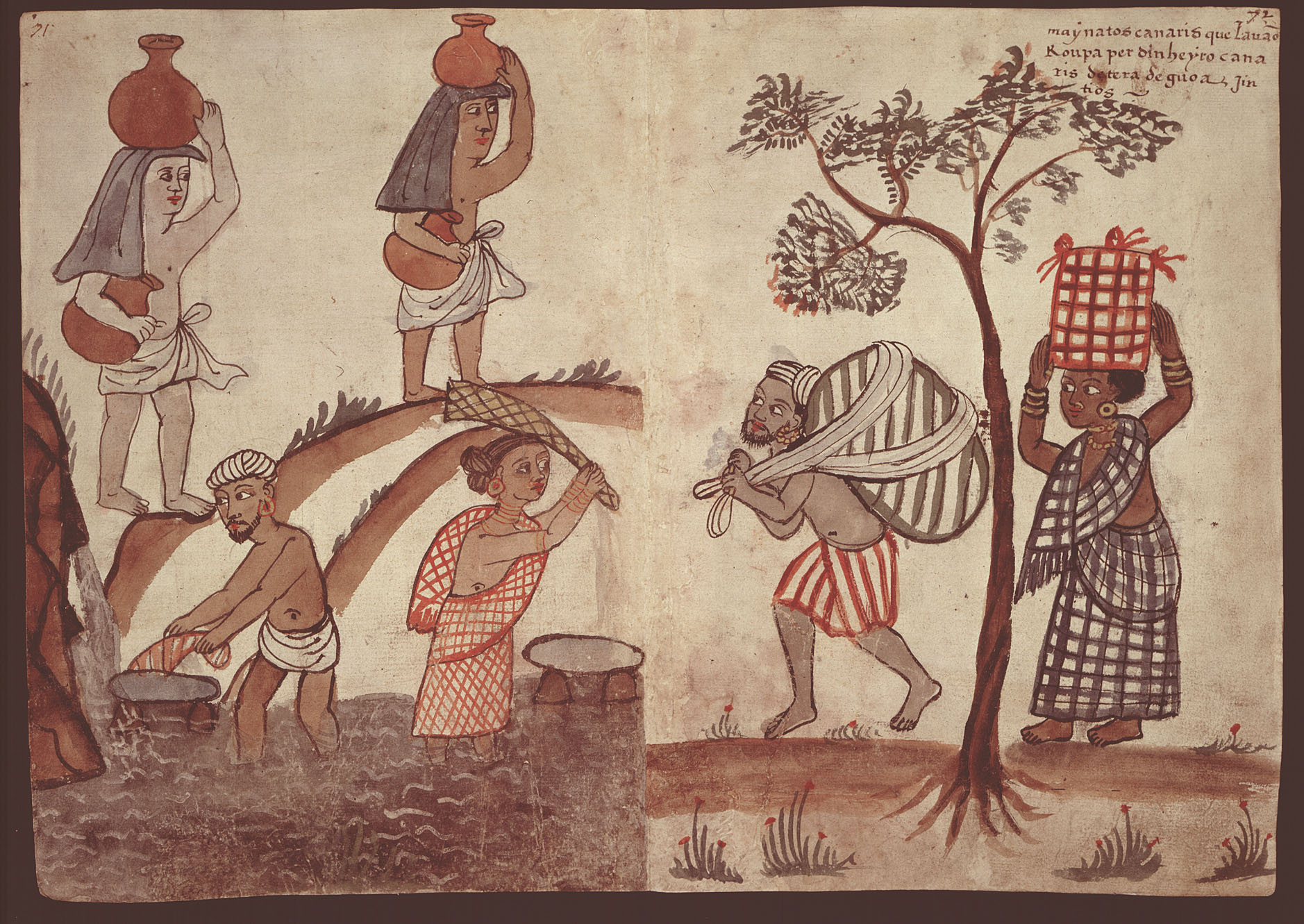
Clothes washers, called mainatos by the Portuguese

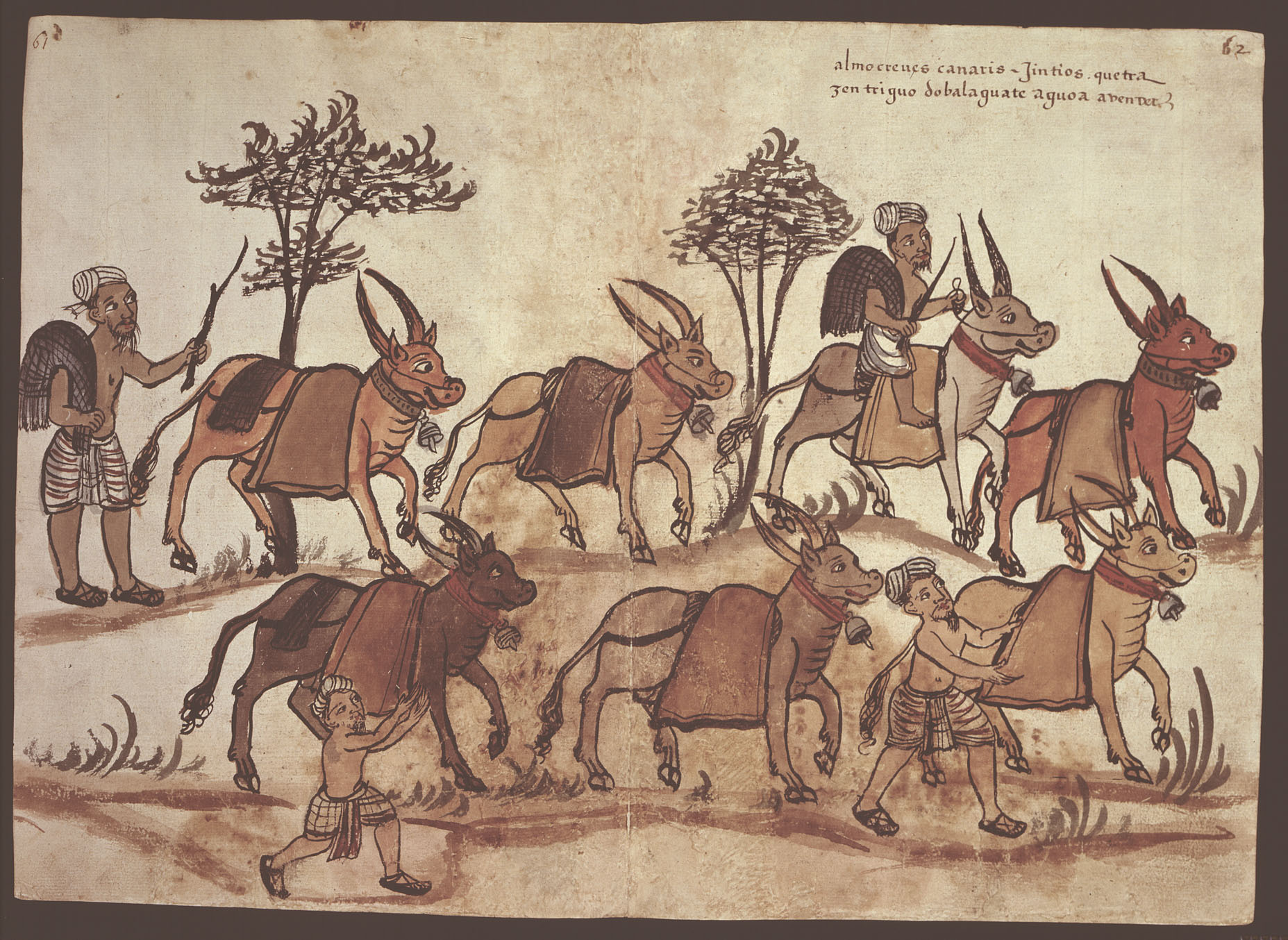
Wheat sellers in Goa

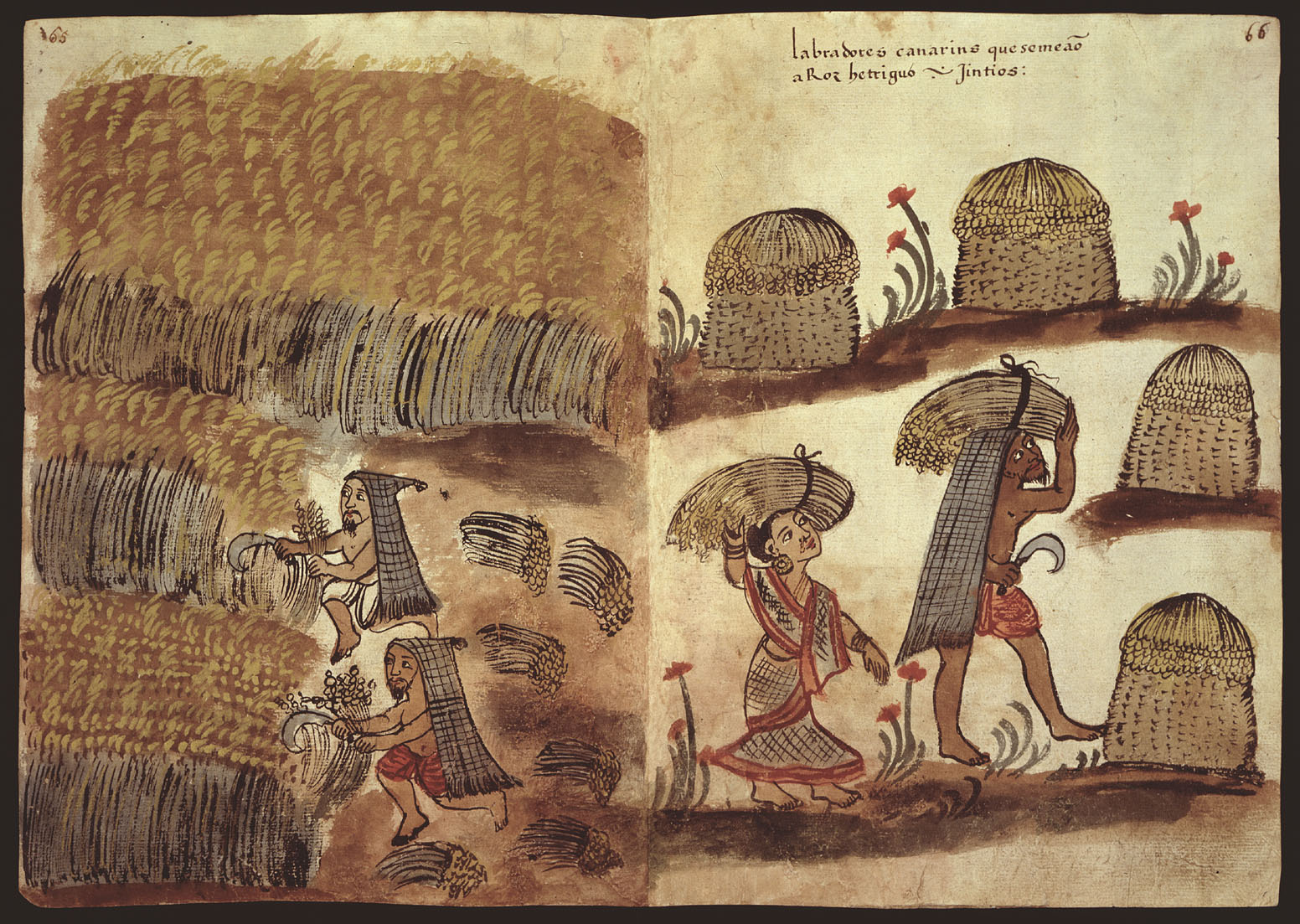
Goan farmers

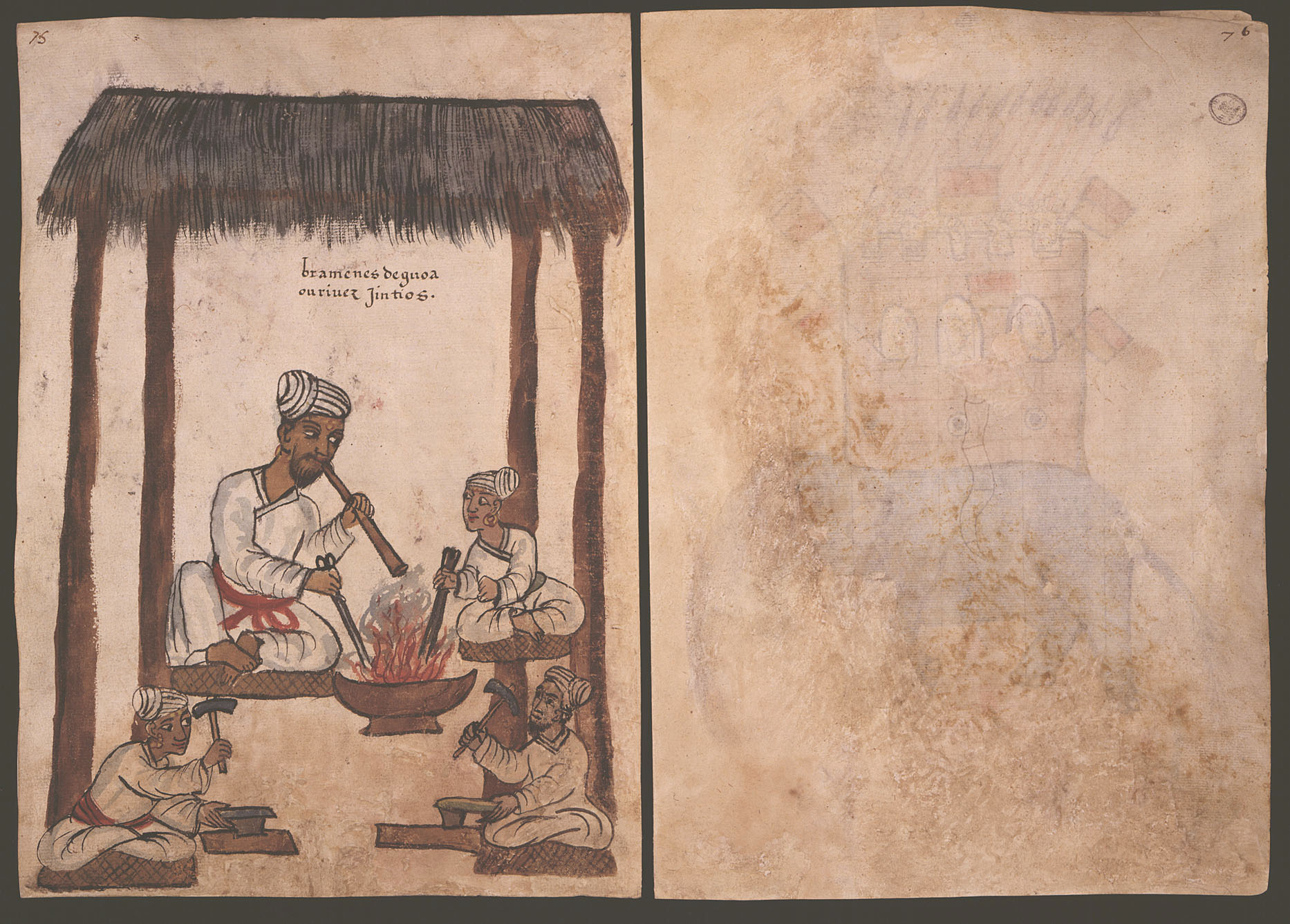
A Brahmin goldsmith from Goa

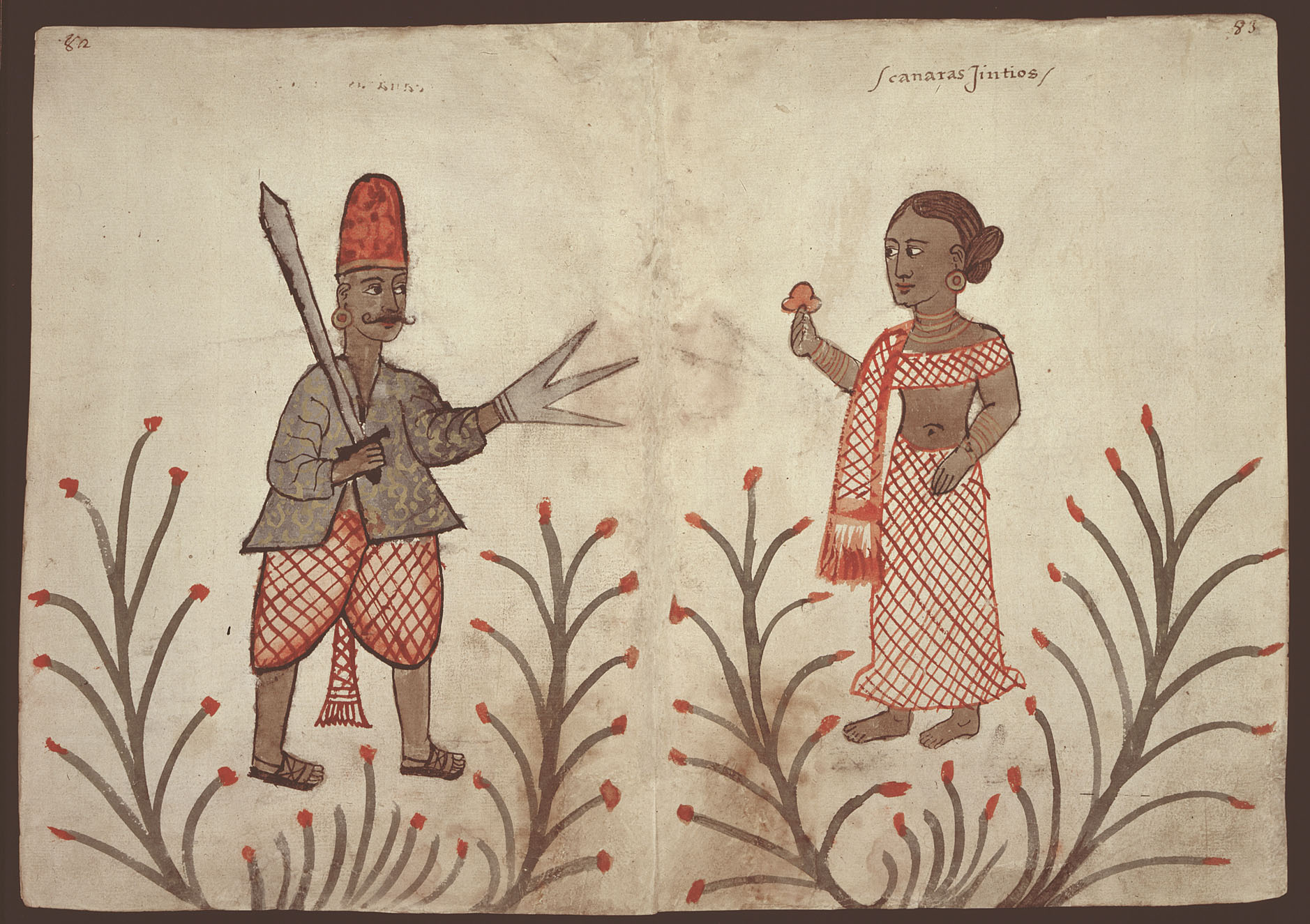
Hindu Kanarese, called "gentiles" by the Portuguese

==== Malabar Coast ====
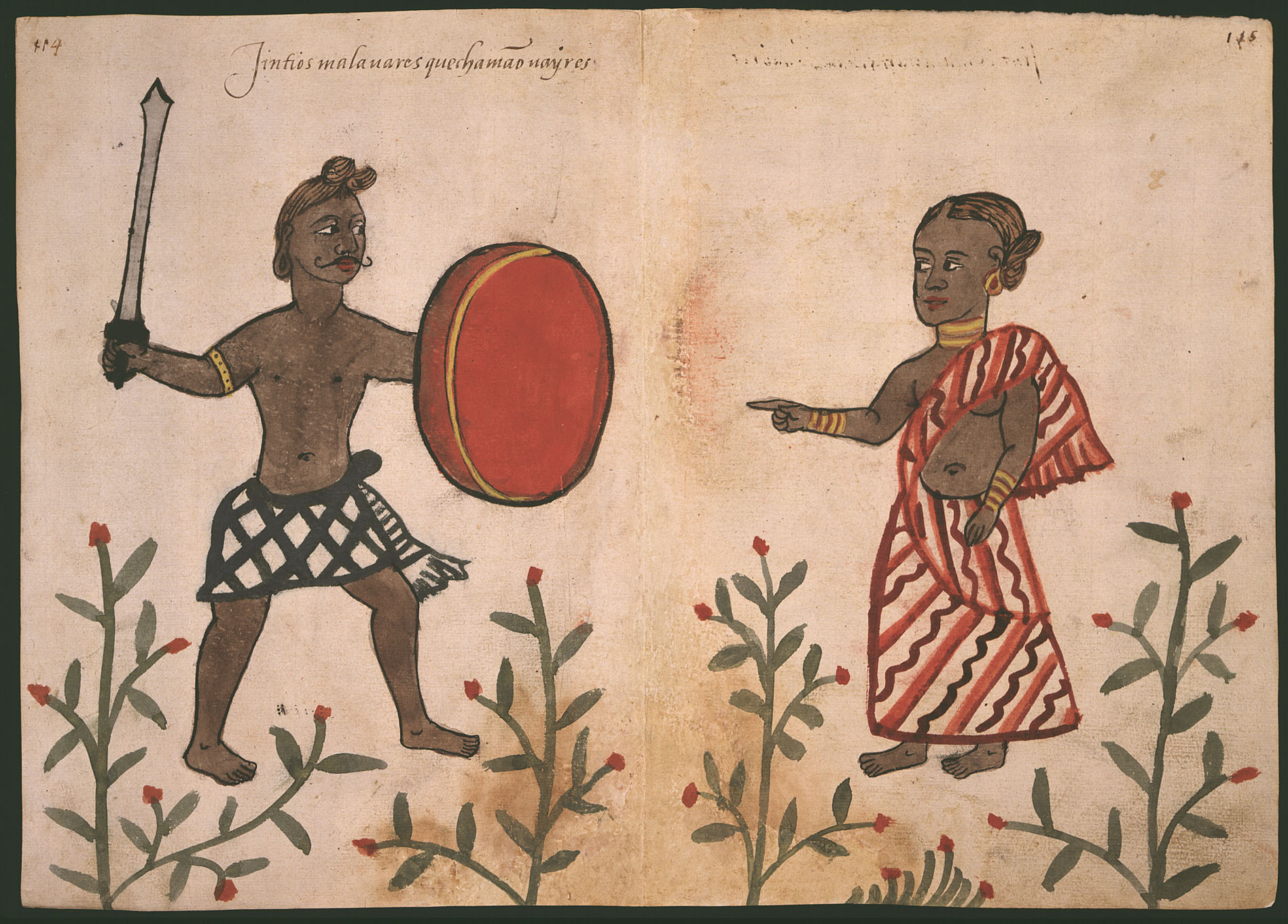
Nayars or Nairs, a Hindu "warrior" caste of the Malabar Coast

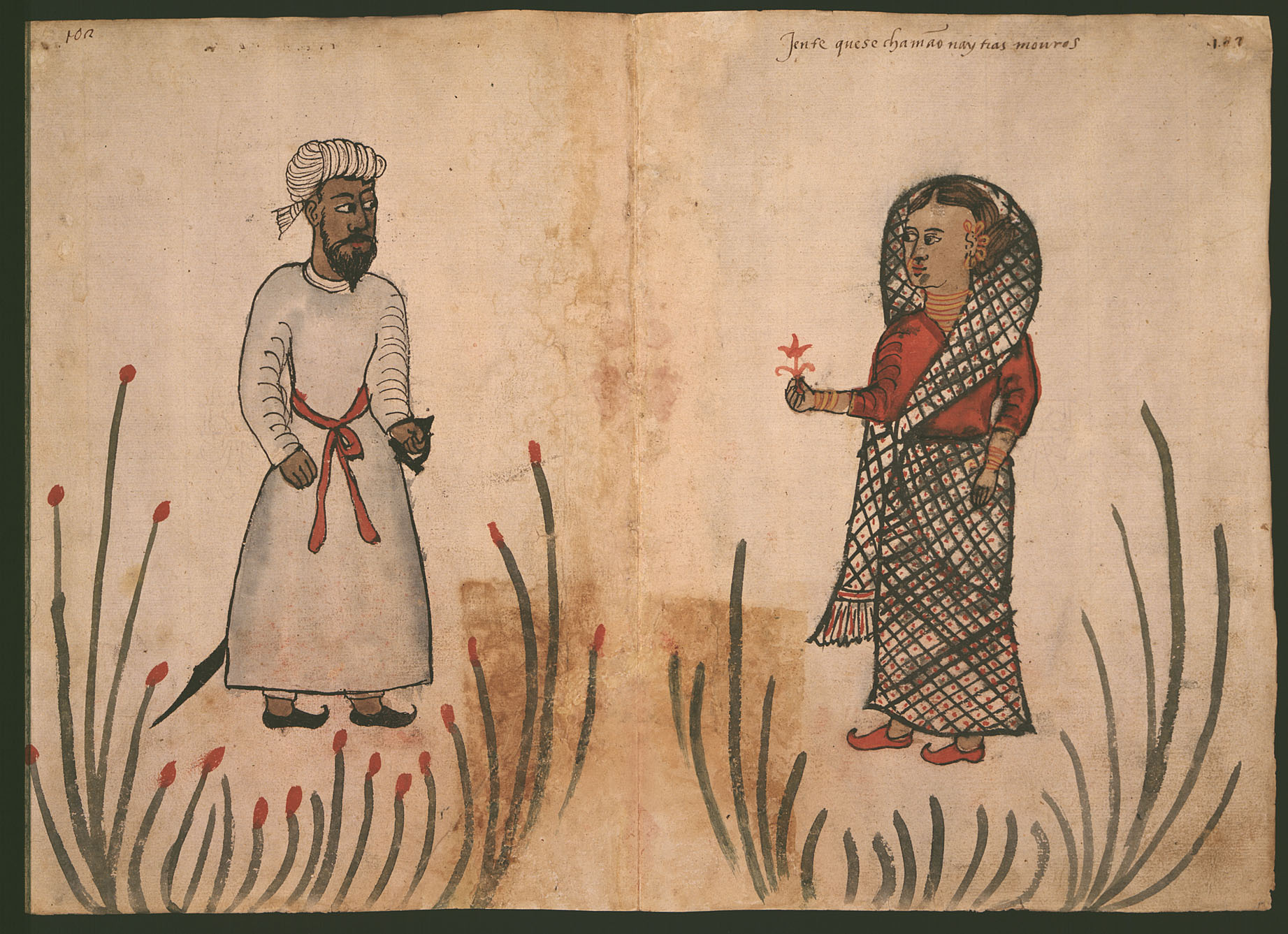
Descendants of Muslim men married to Indian women, called Naitás ("Navayats") by the Portuguese

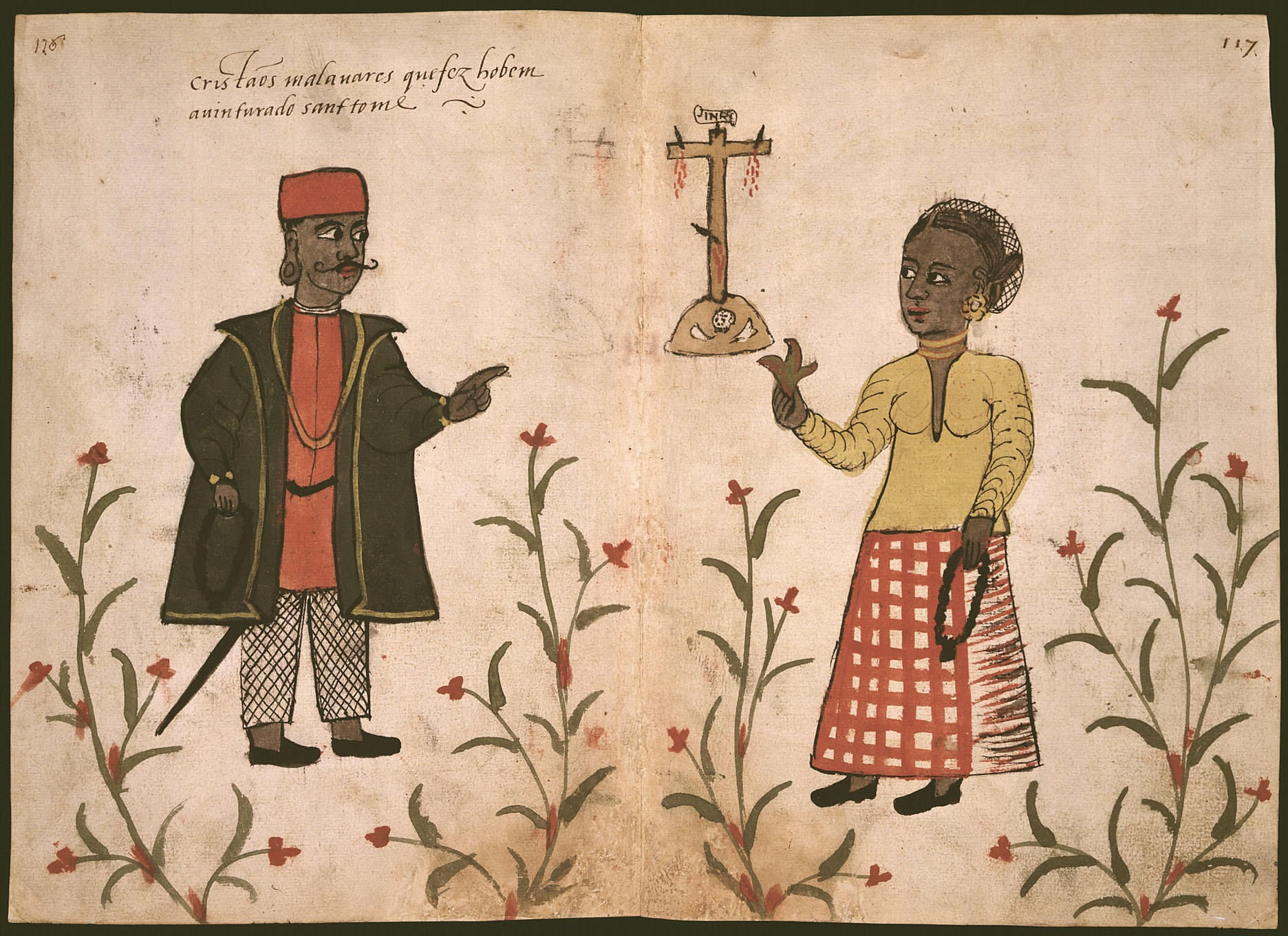
Malabarese Christians of Saint Thomas

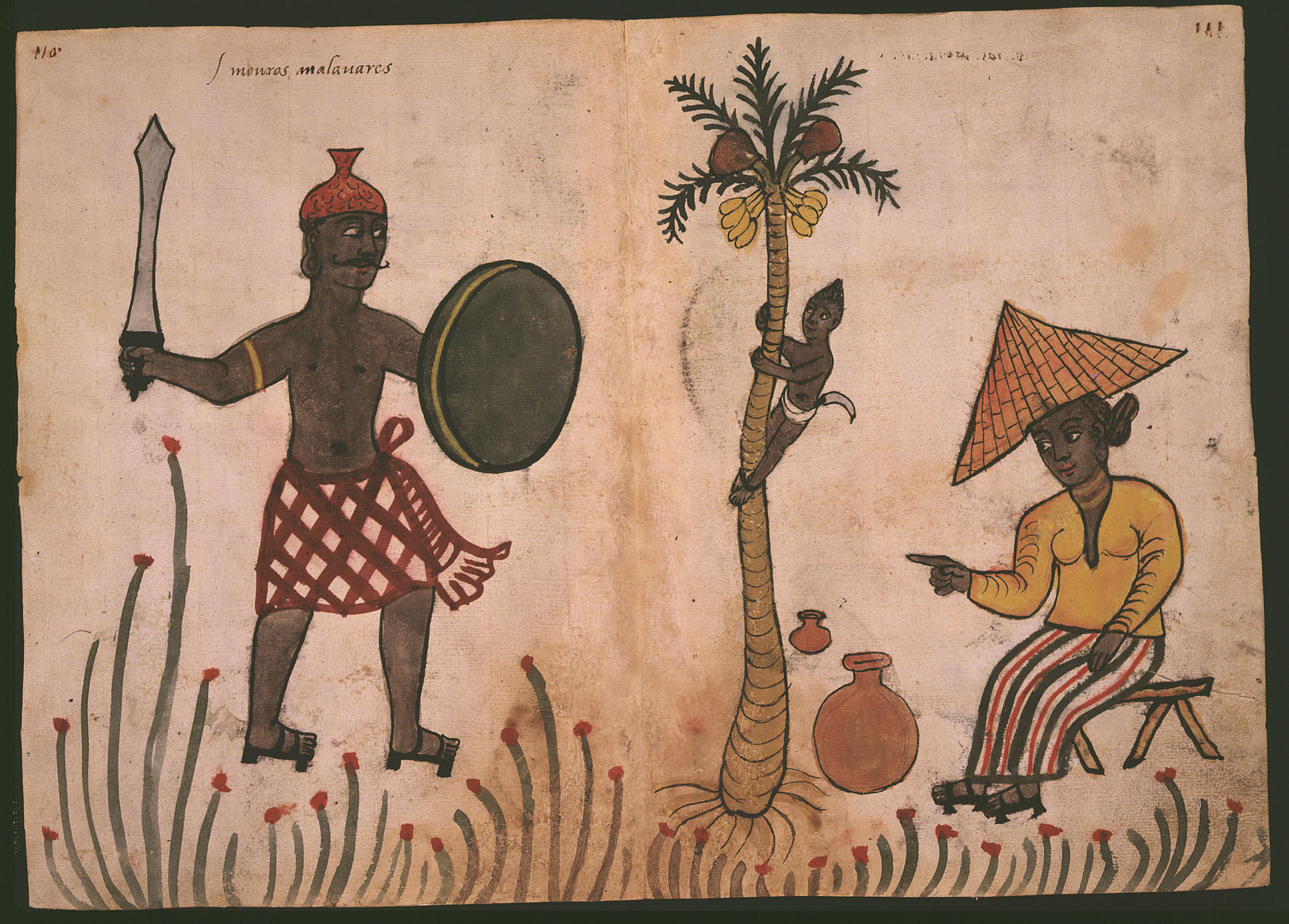
Malabarese Muslims (Mappila)

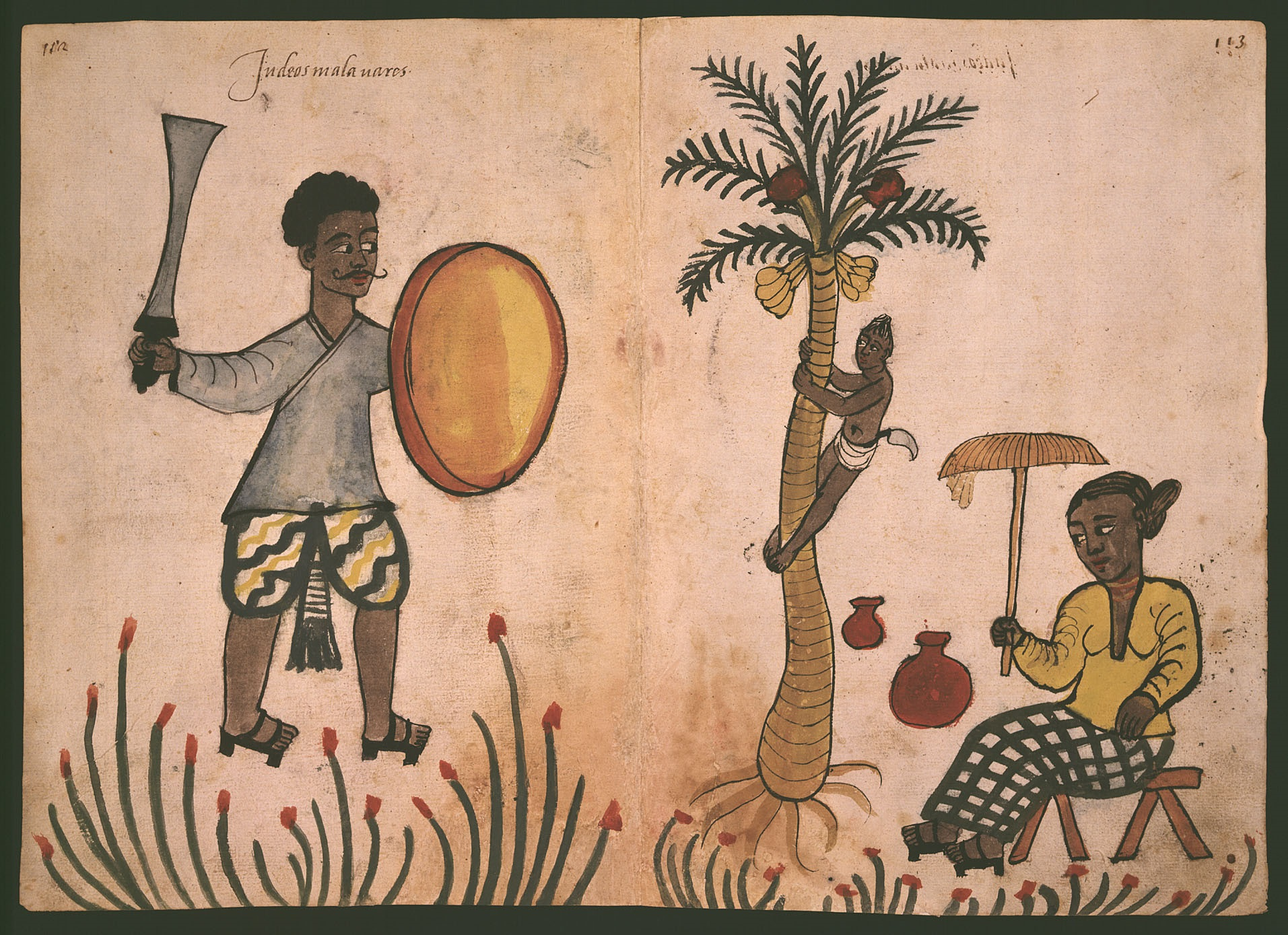
Malabarese Jews

==== Coromandel Coast ====
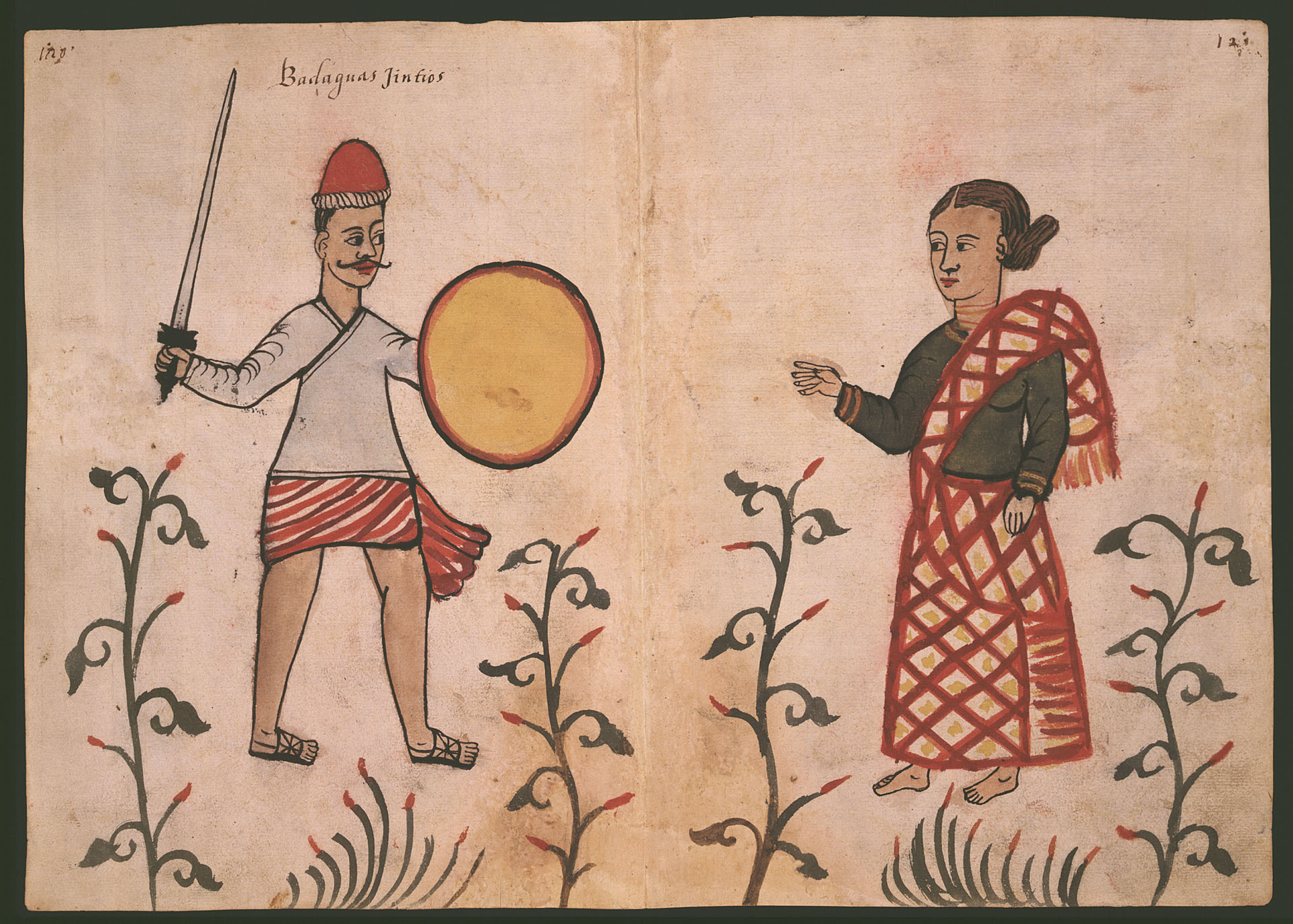
Badagas, who inhabited the southeastern coast of India

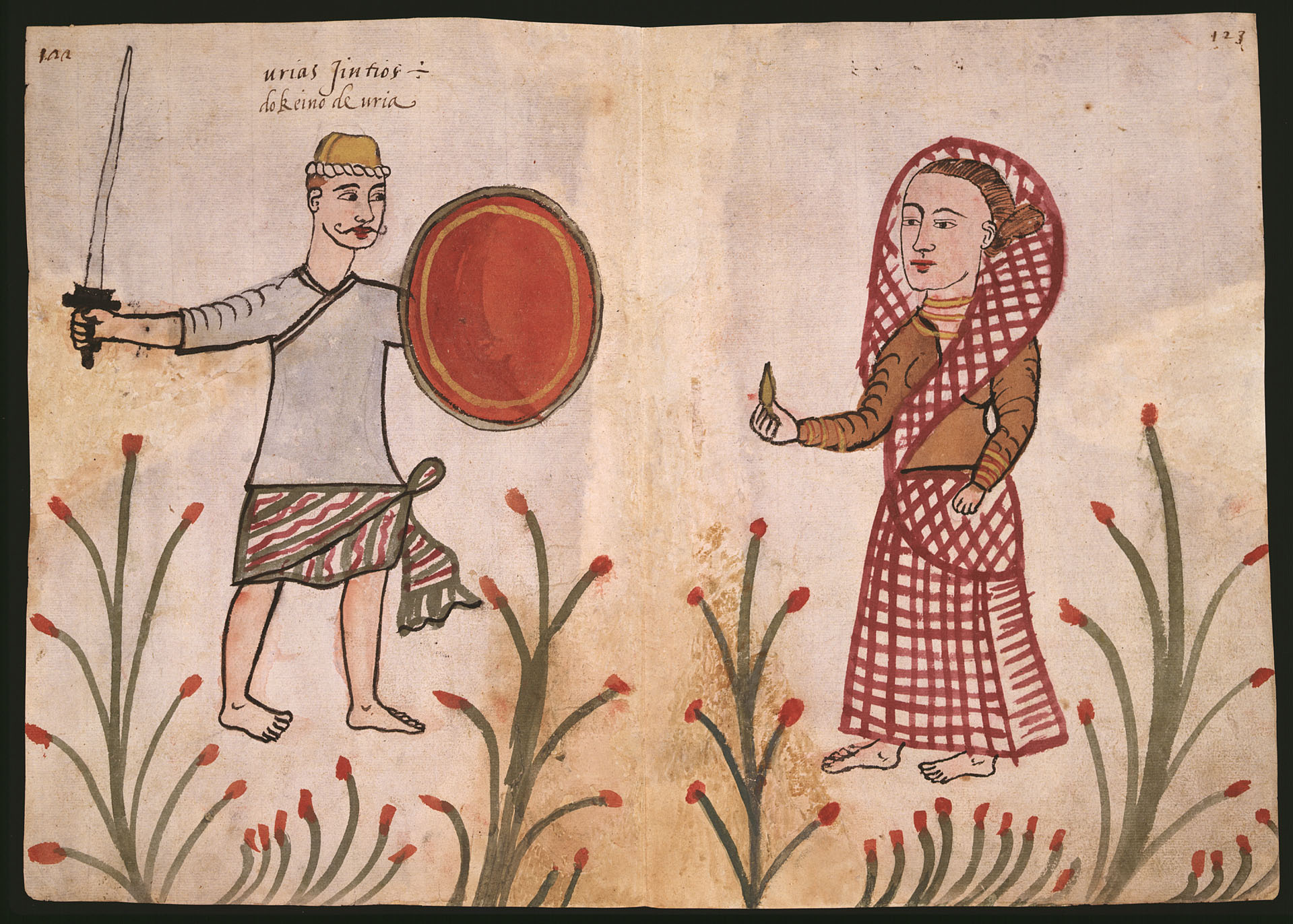
People from Orissa, in the eastern coast of India

==== Ceylon ====
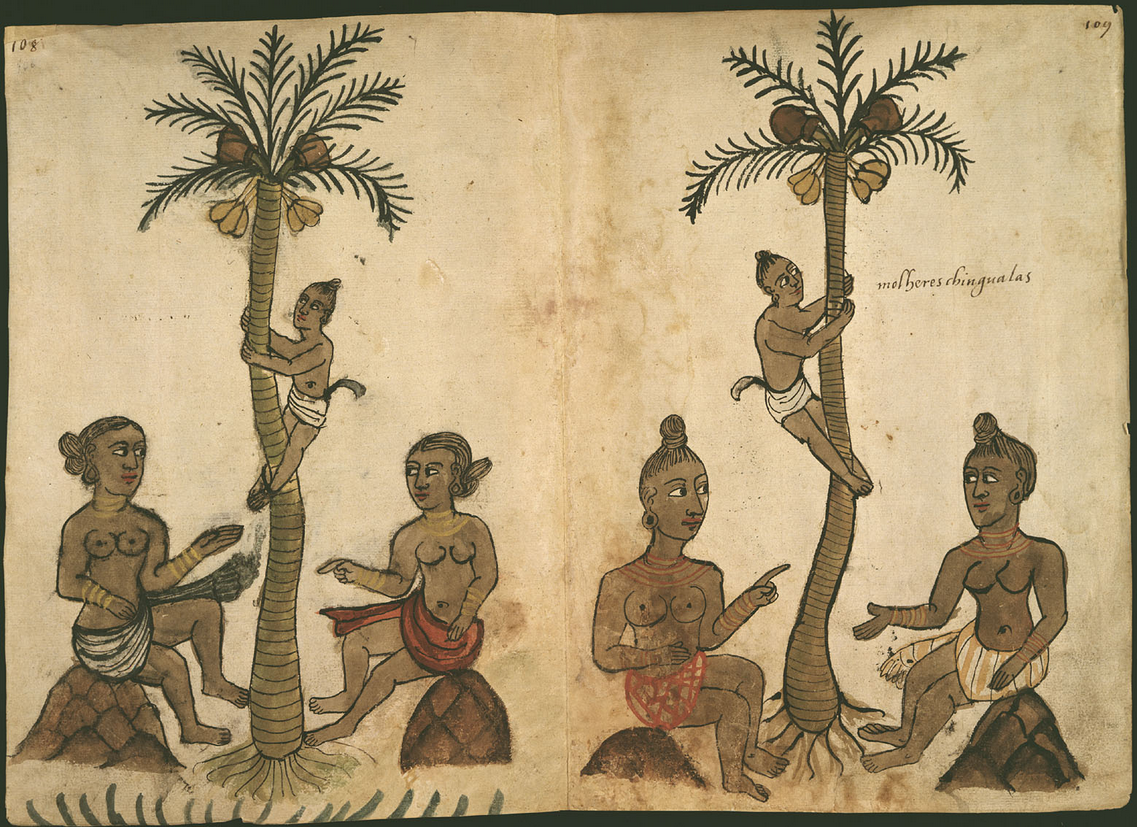
Women of Sri Lanka

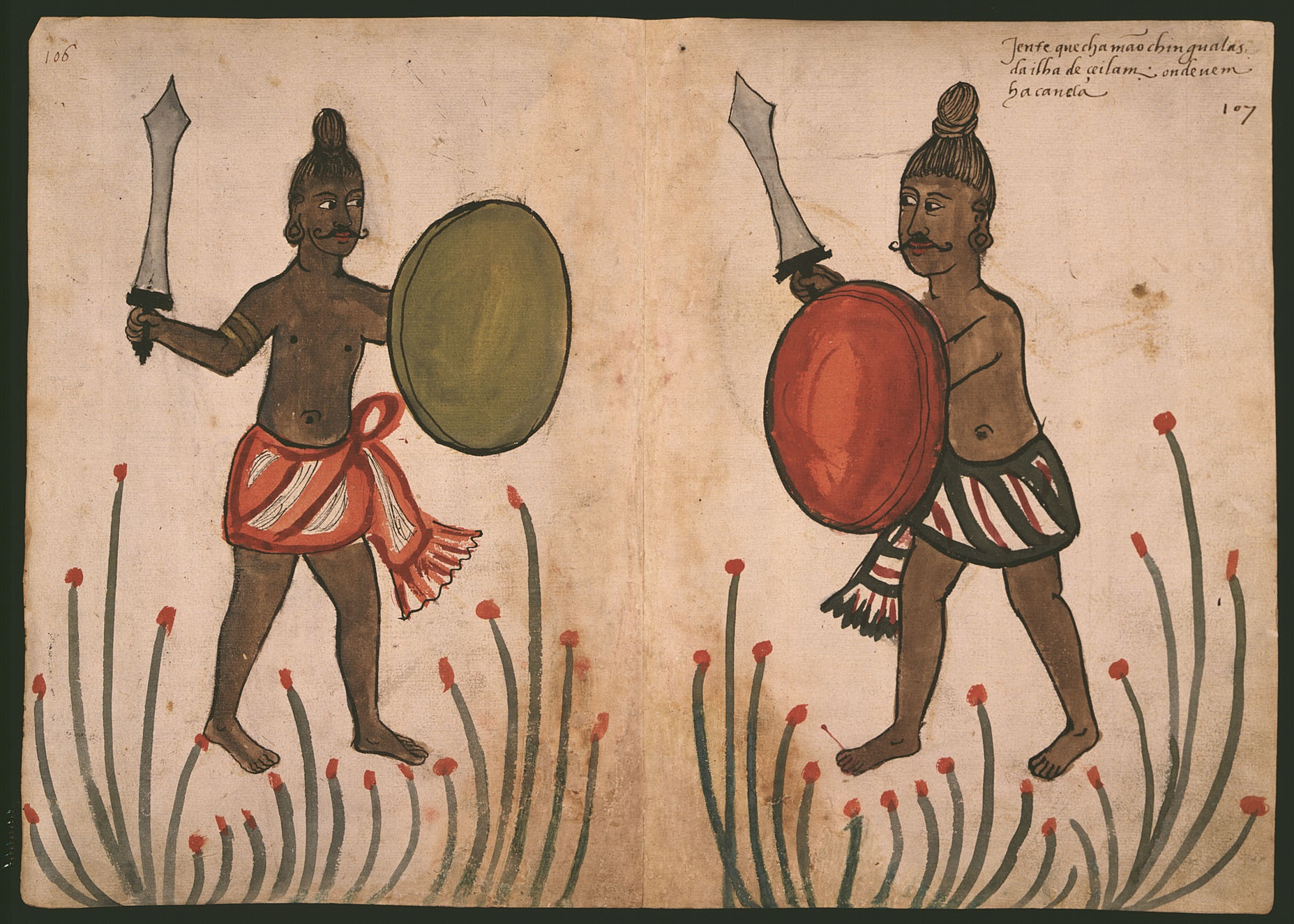
"Chingalas"; warriors of Sri Lanka, "where the cinnamon is born"

==== Maldives ====
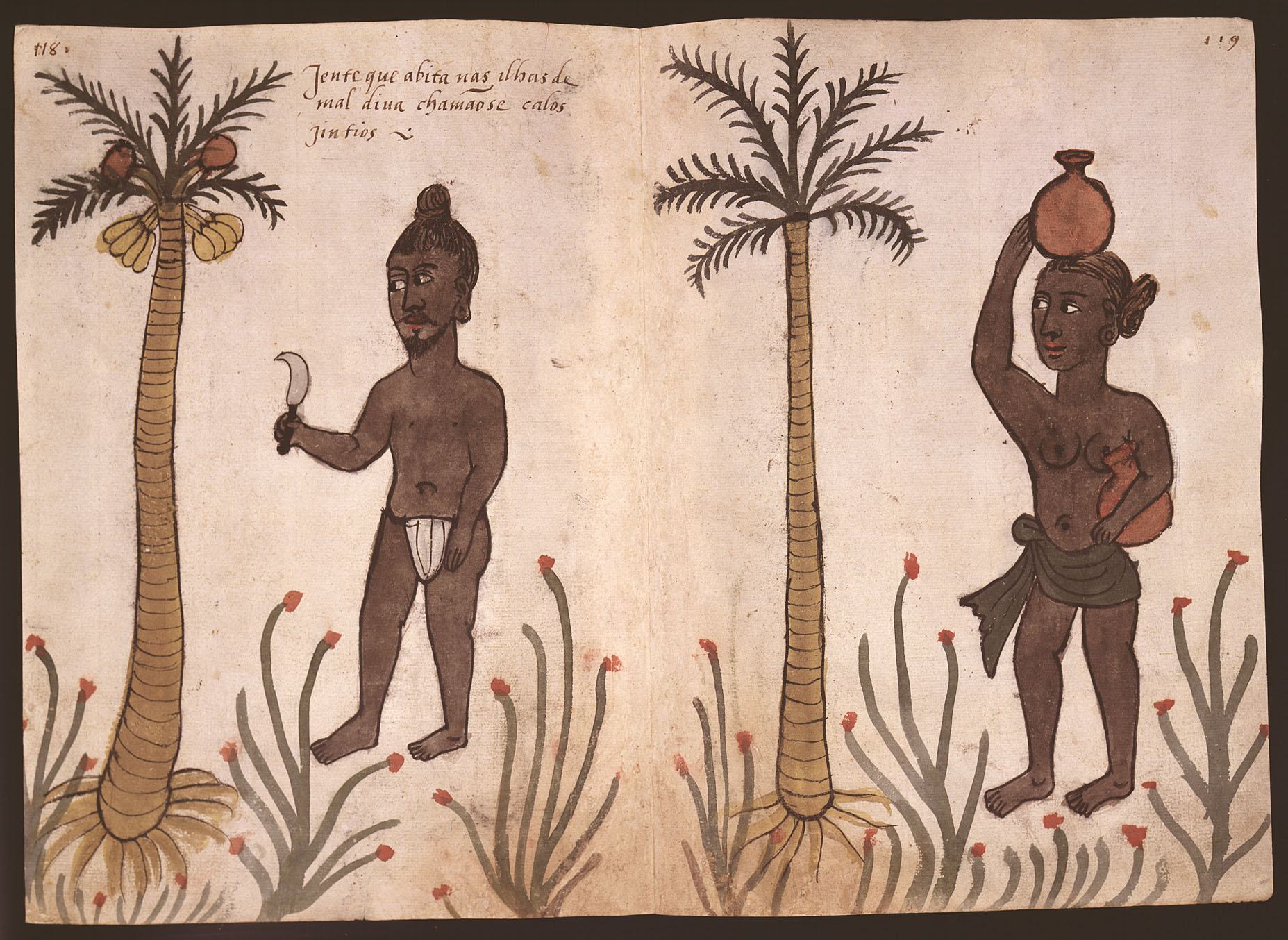
Maldivians

=== Southeast Asia ===
==== Burma ====
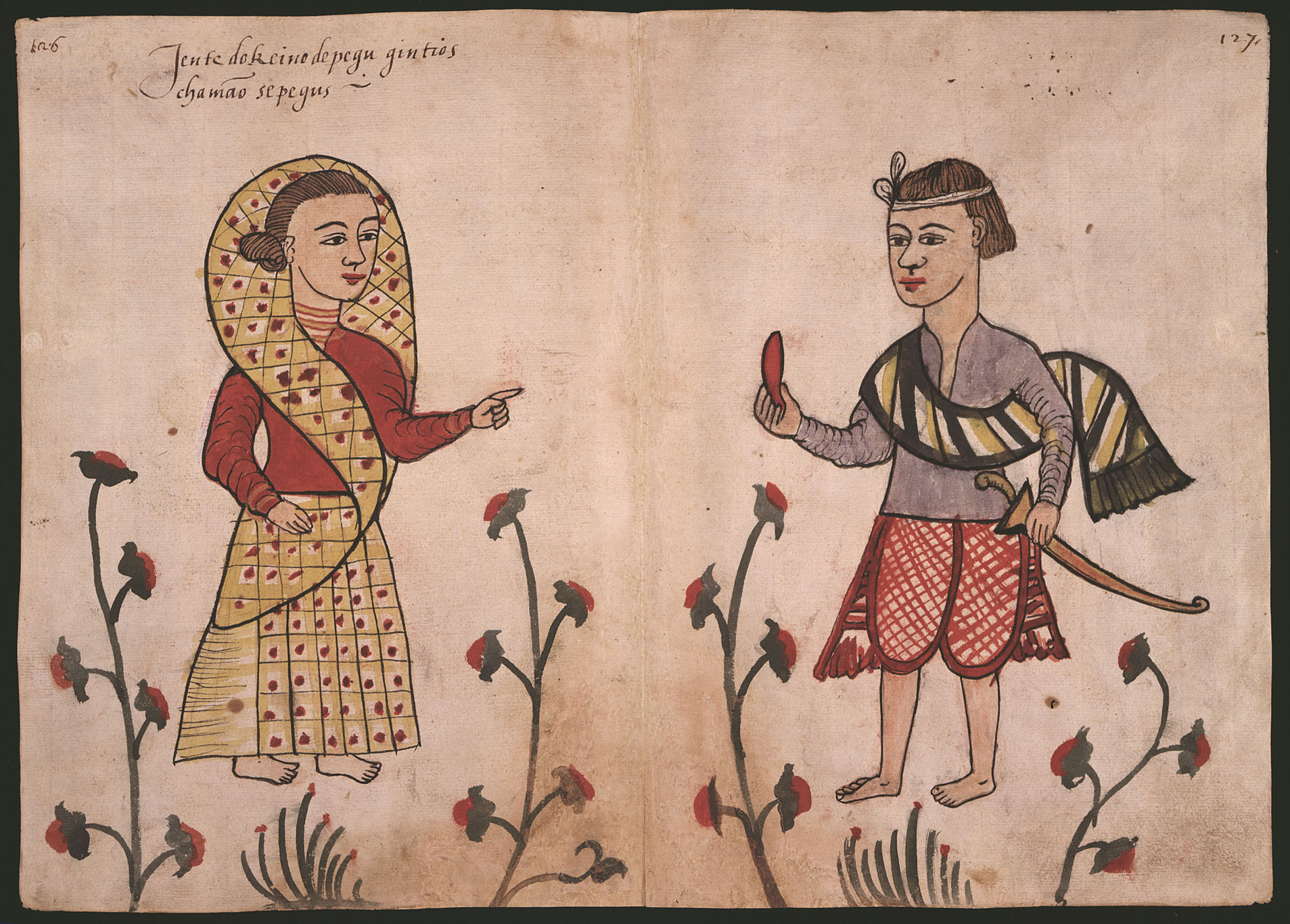
People from the Kingdom of Bago

==== Malacca ====
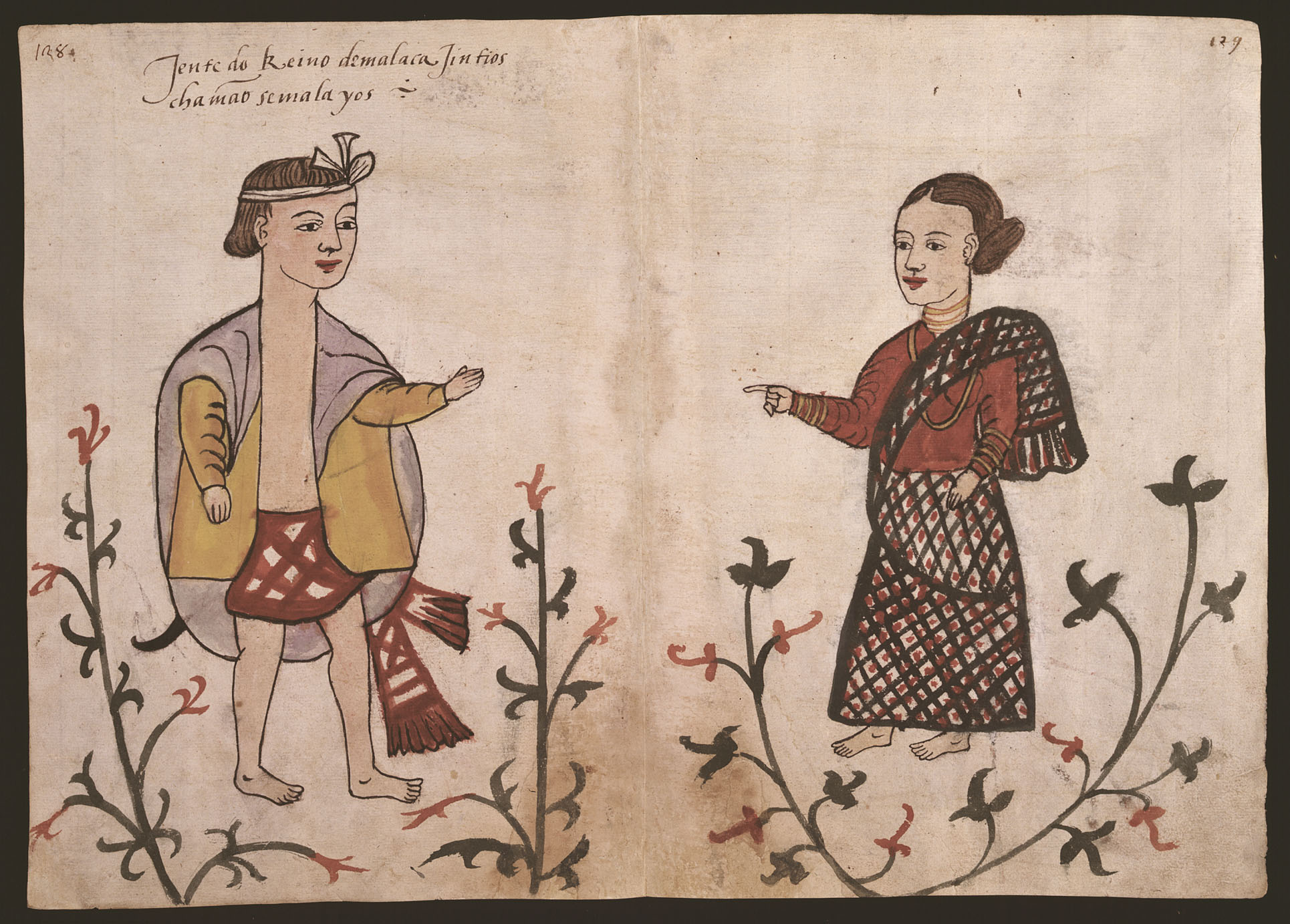
Malay "gentiles" of the Kingdom of Malacca

==== Indonesia ====
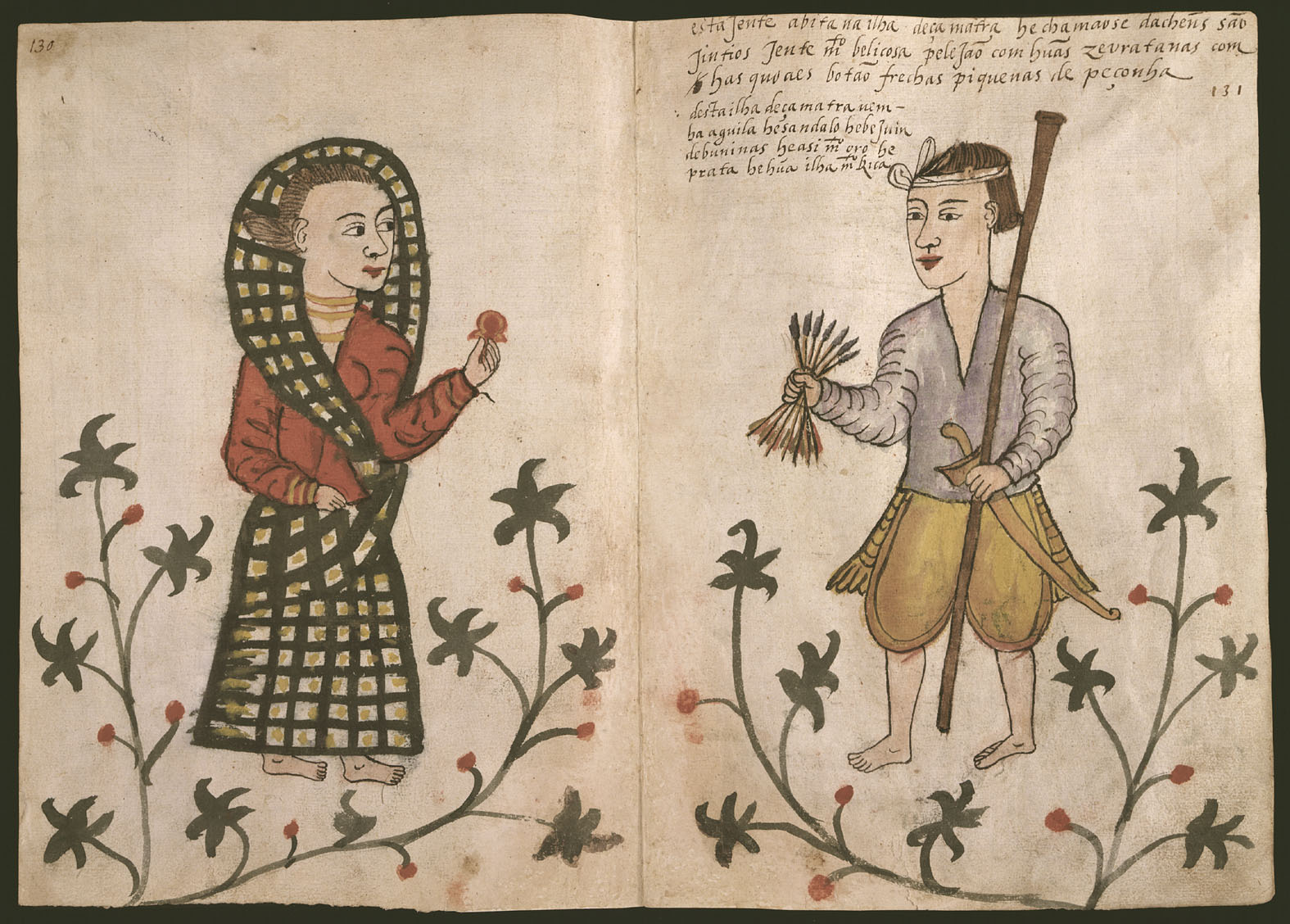
Acehnese people

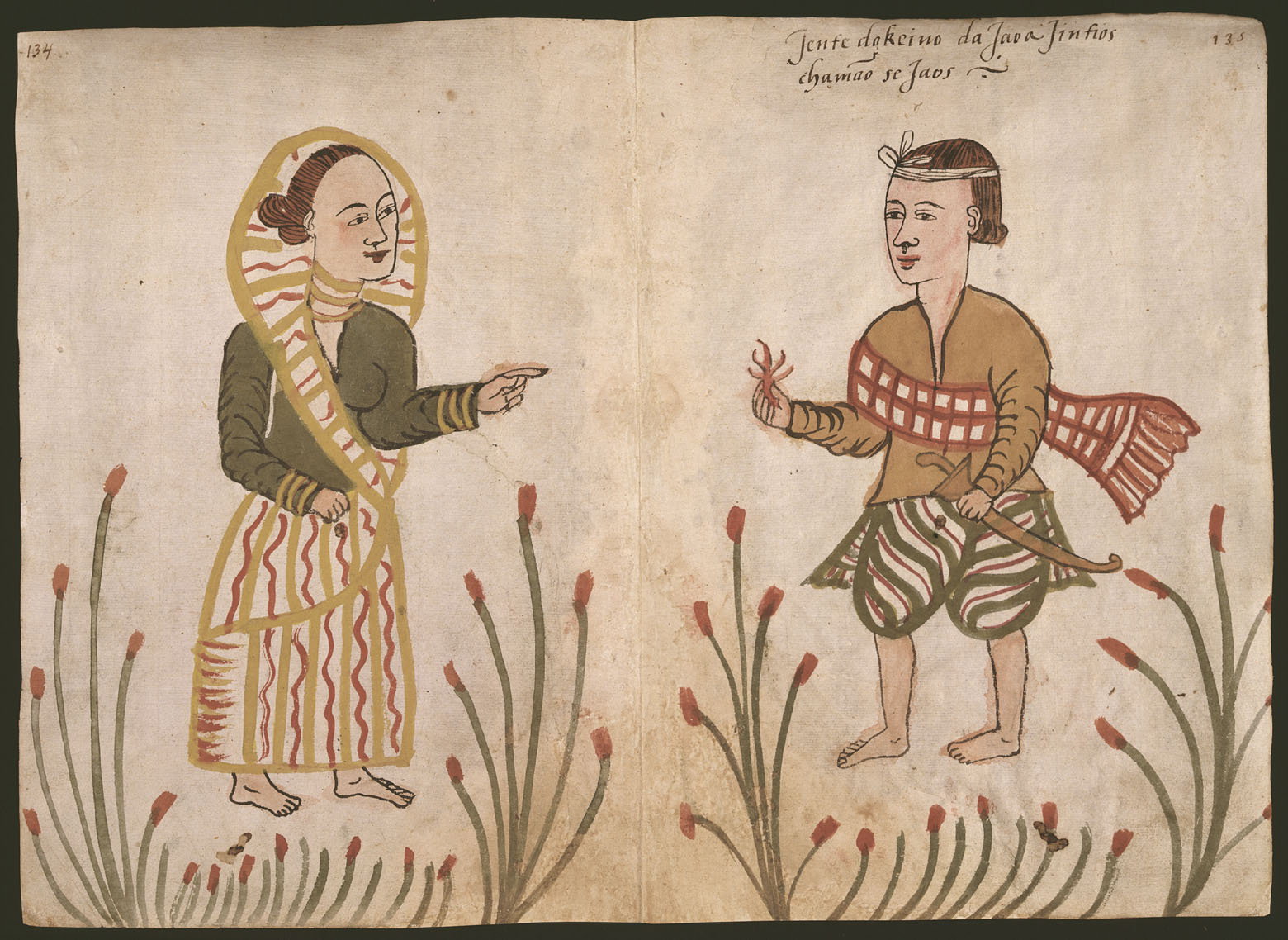
Javanese people

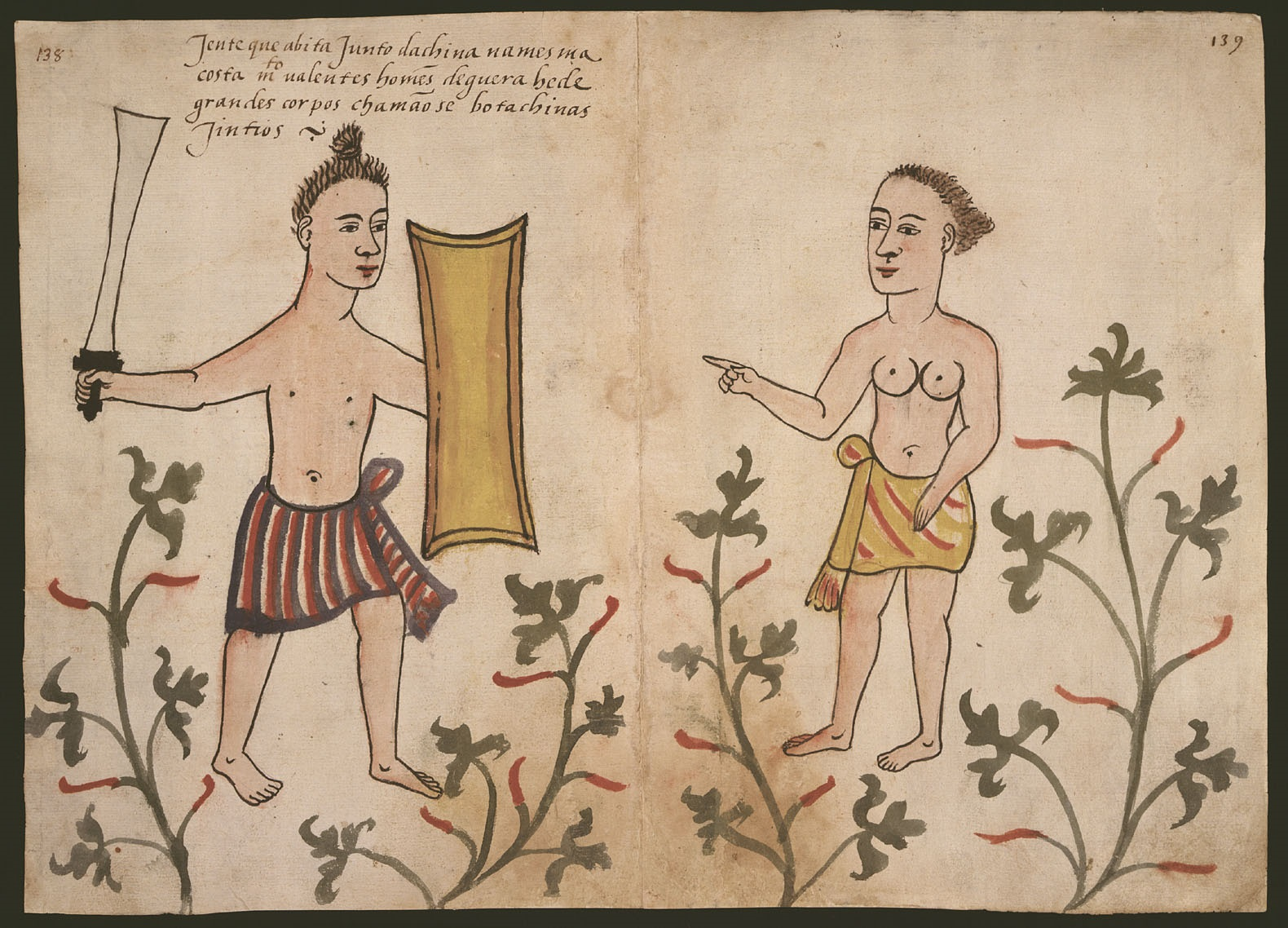
People from Halmahera, also known as Gilolo

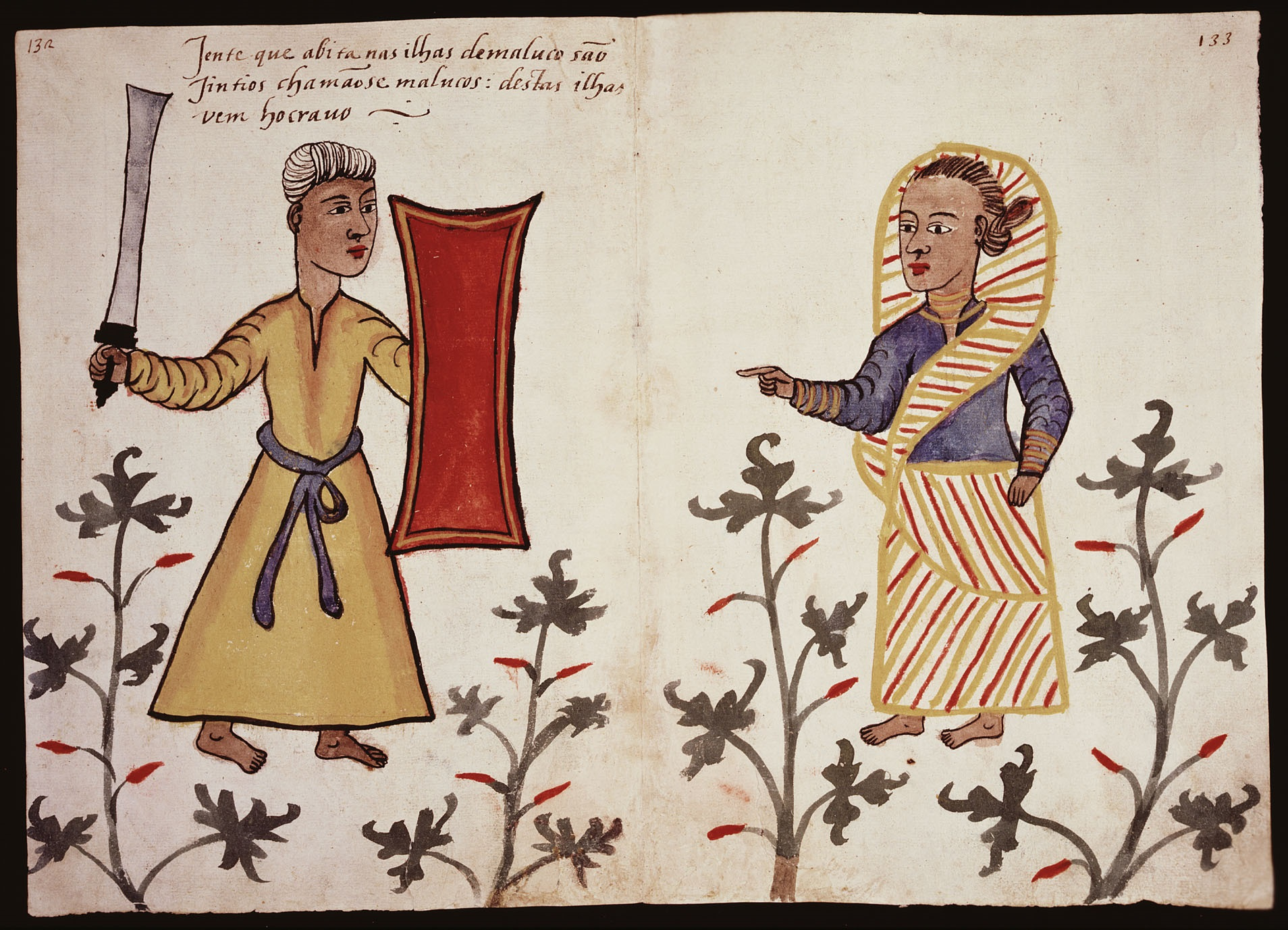
Moluccans

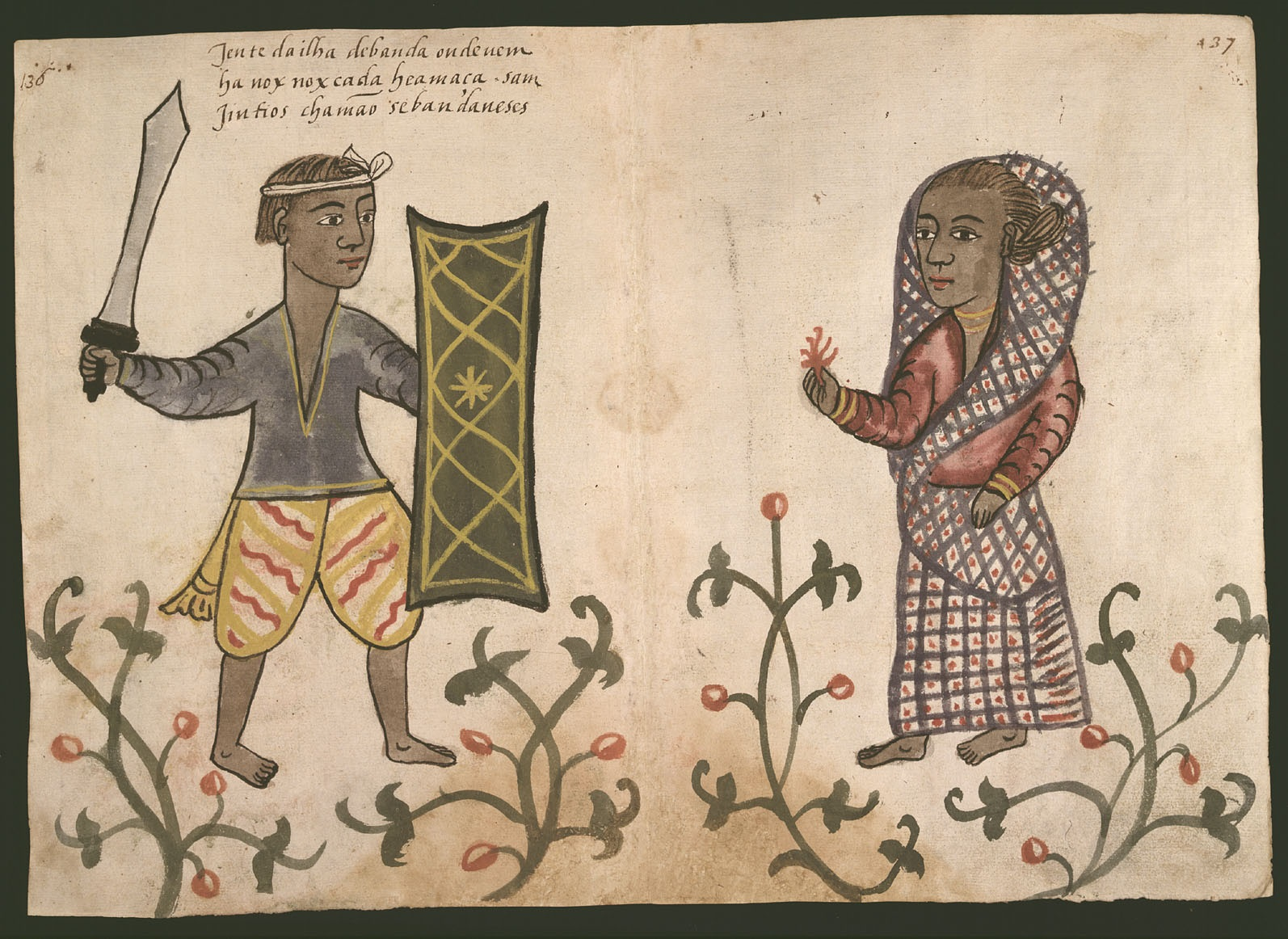
Bandanese

=== East Asia ===
==== China ====
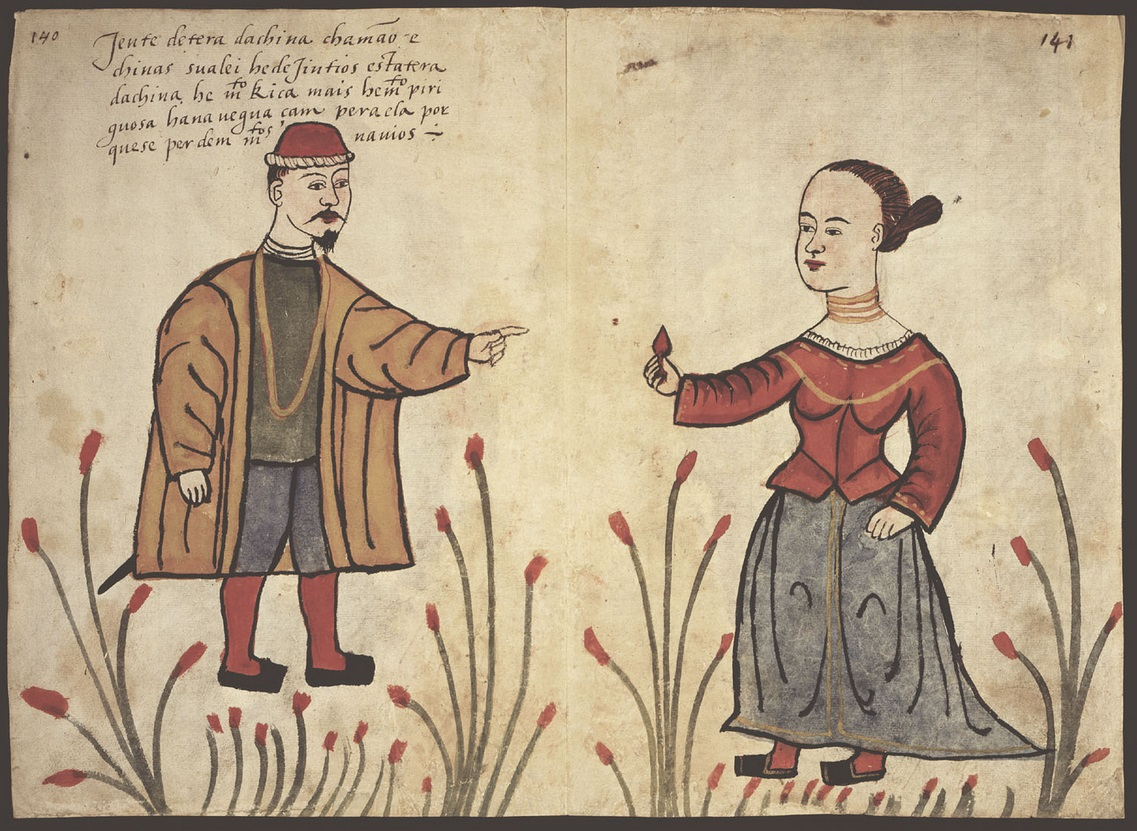
Chinese

== Miscellaneous ==
=== Hindu rituals ===
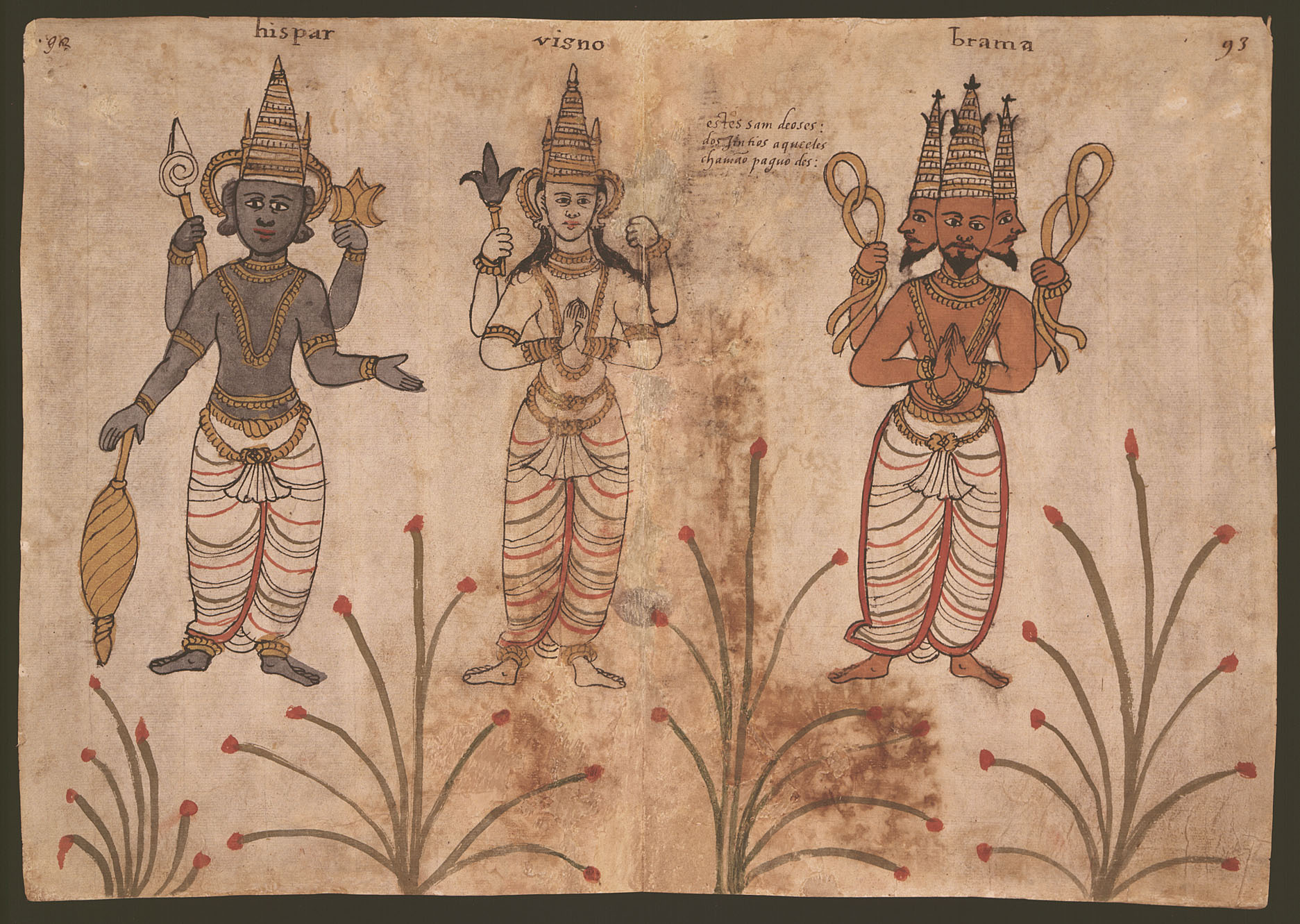
Illustration of the three main deities of Hinduism

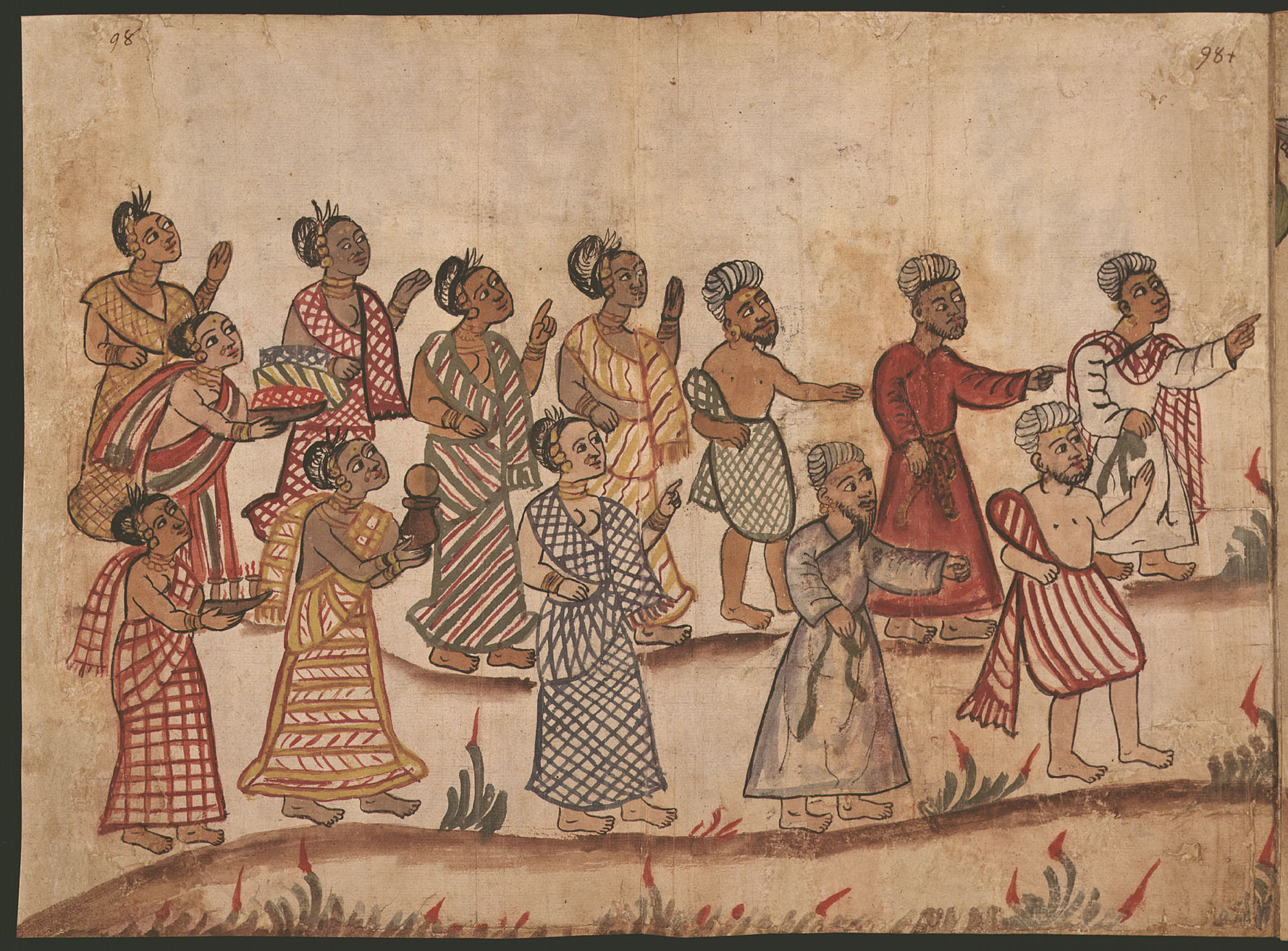
Hindu marriage, left

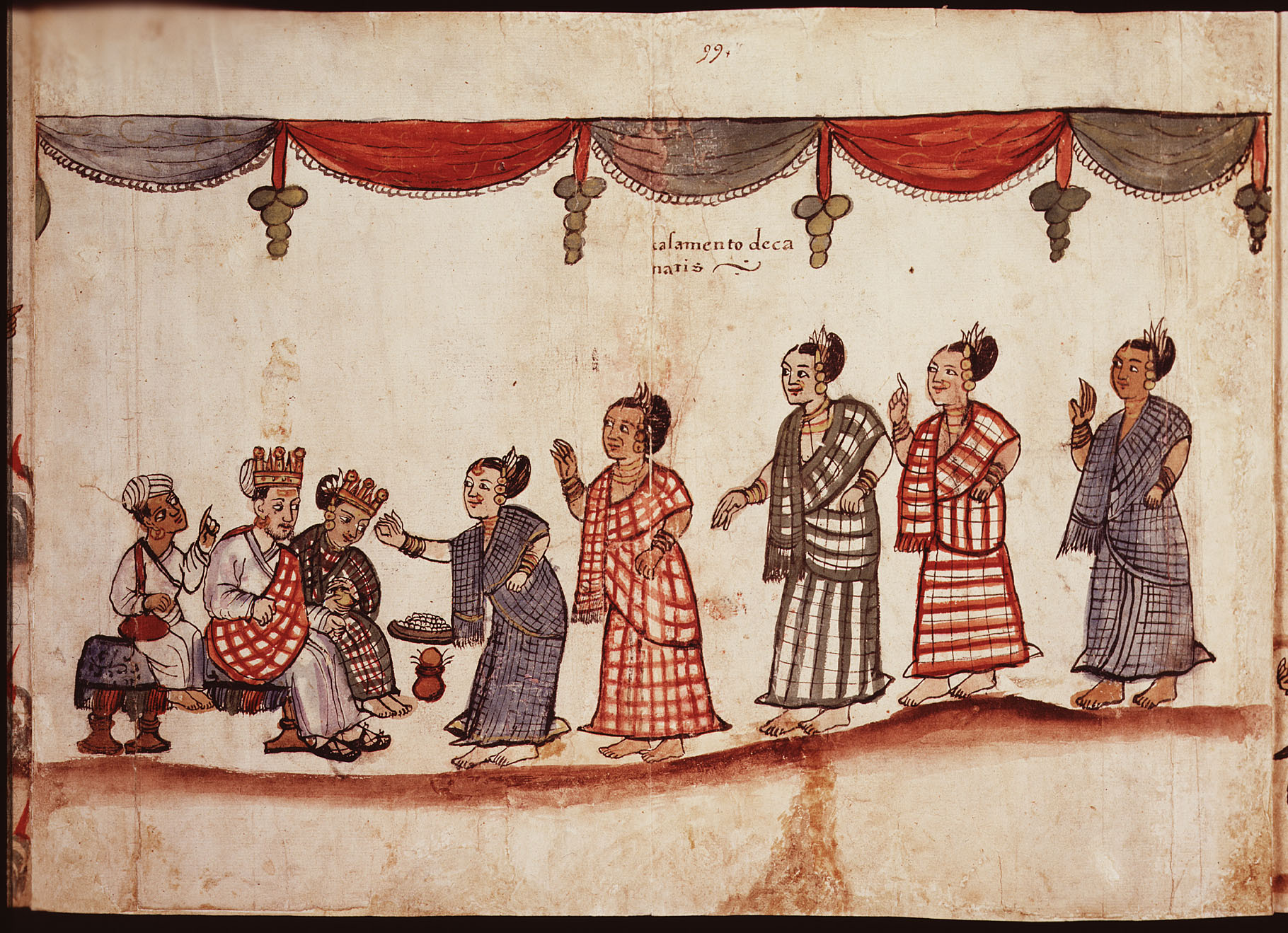
Hindu marriage, center

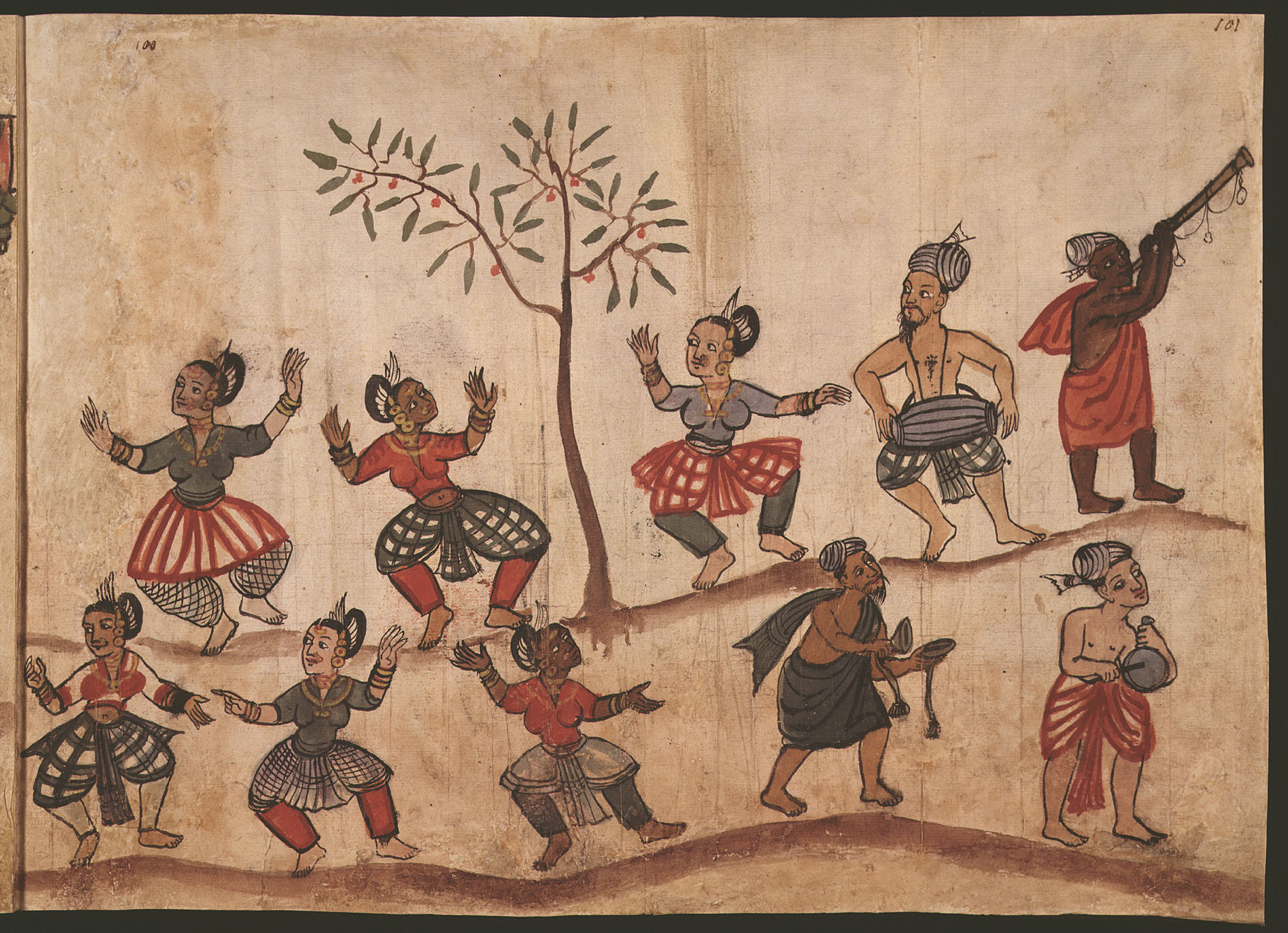
Hindu marriage, right

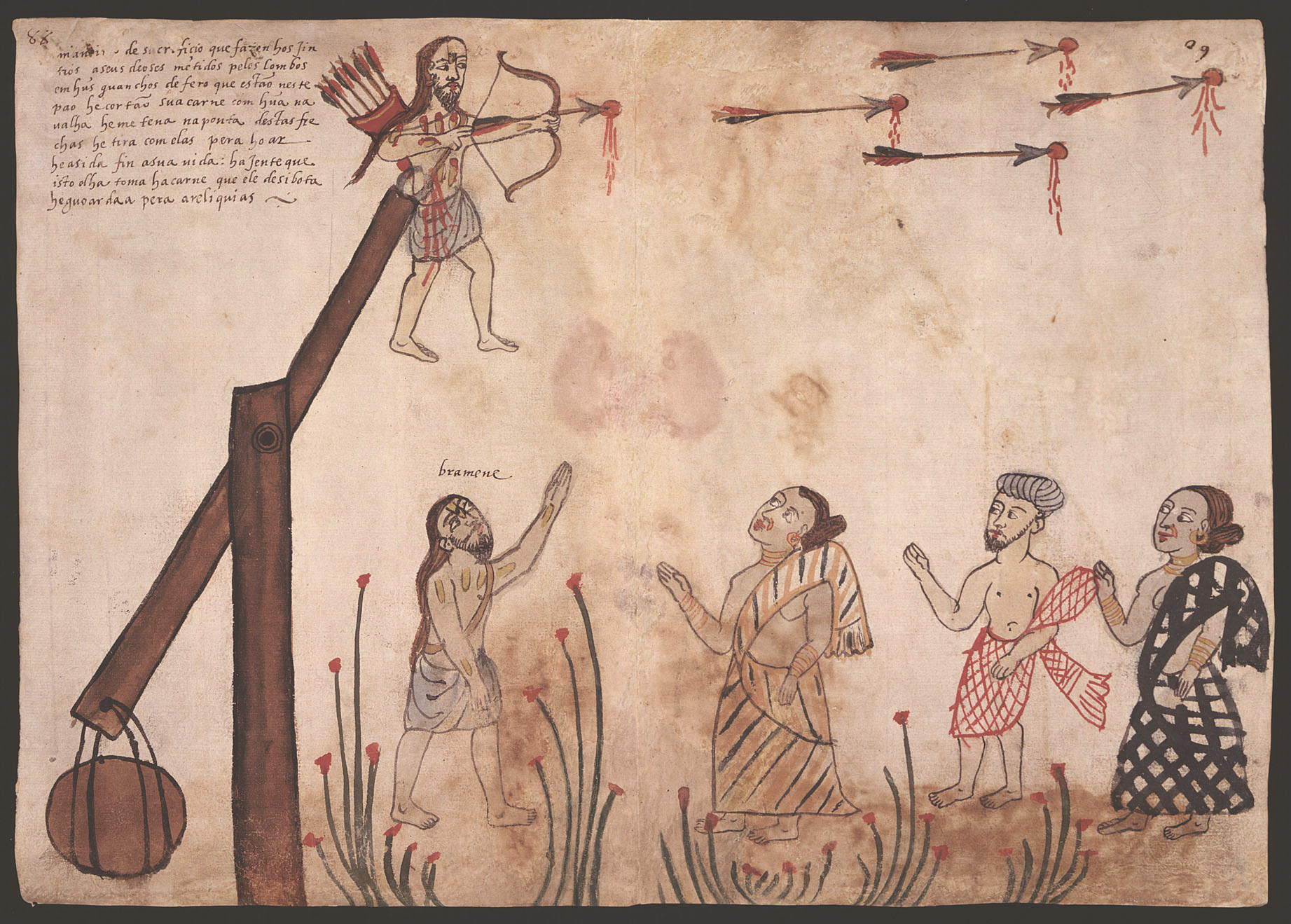
Hindu ritual of hook swinging

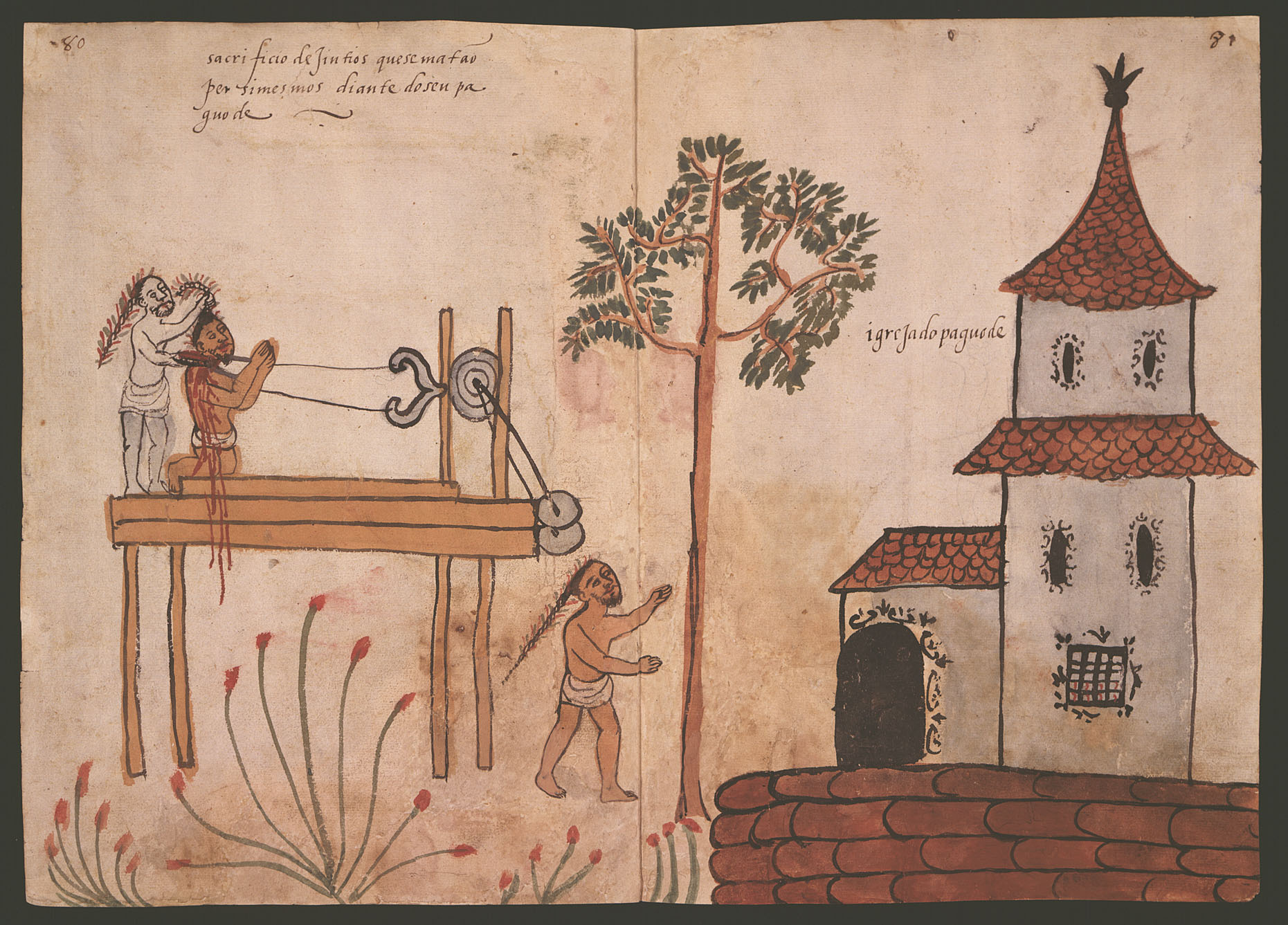
Hindu self-sacrifice

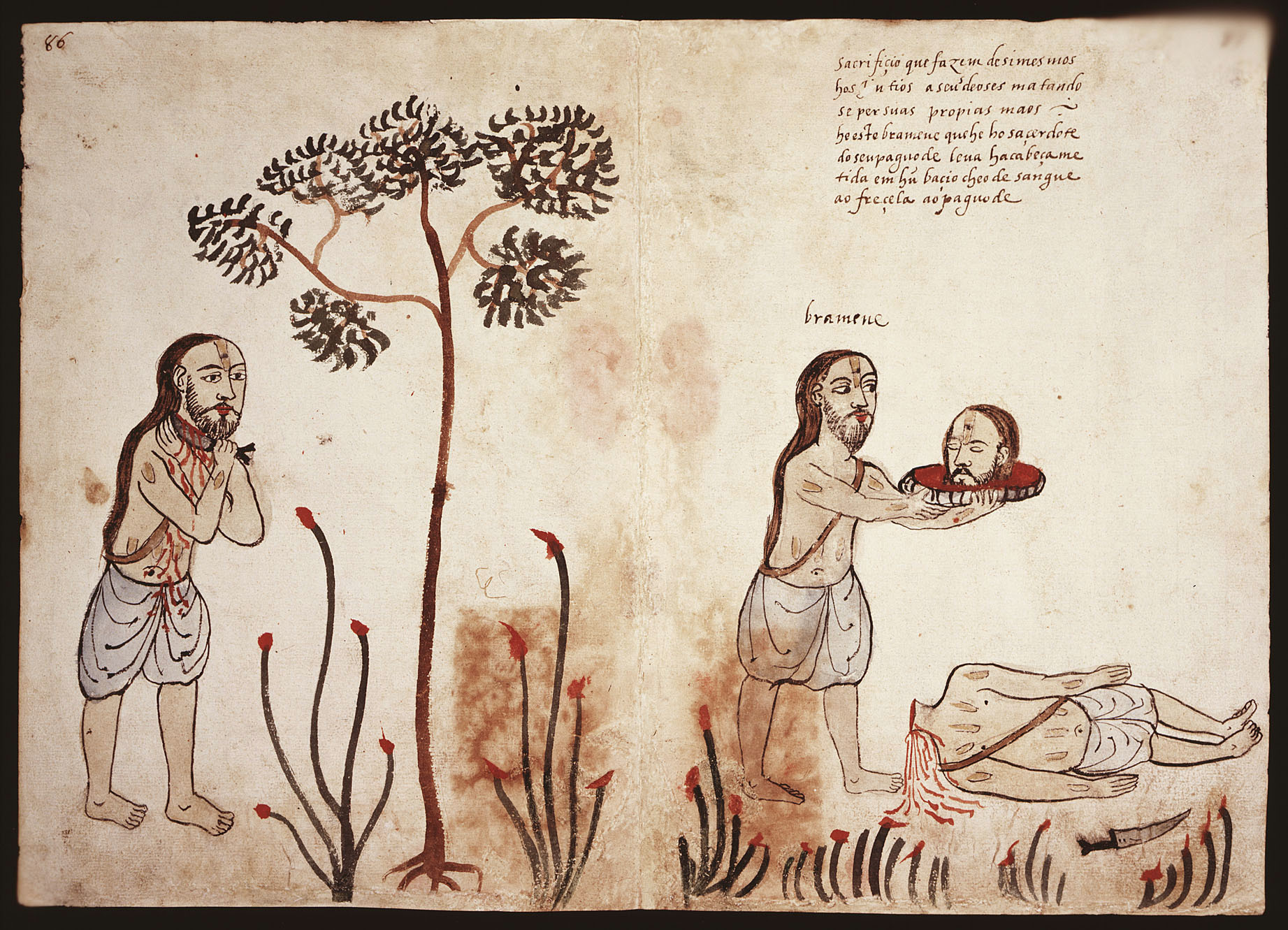
Hindu self-sacrifice

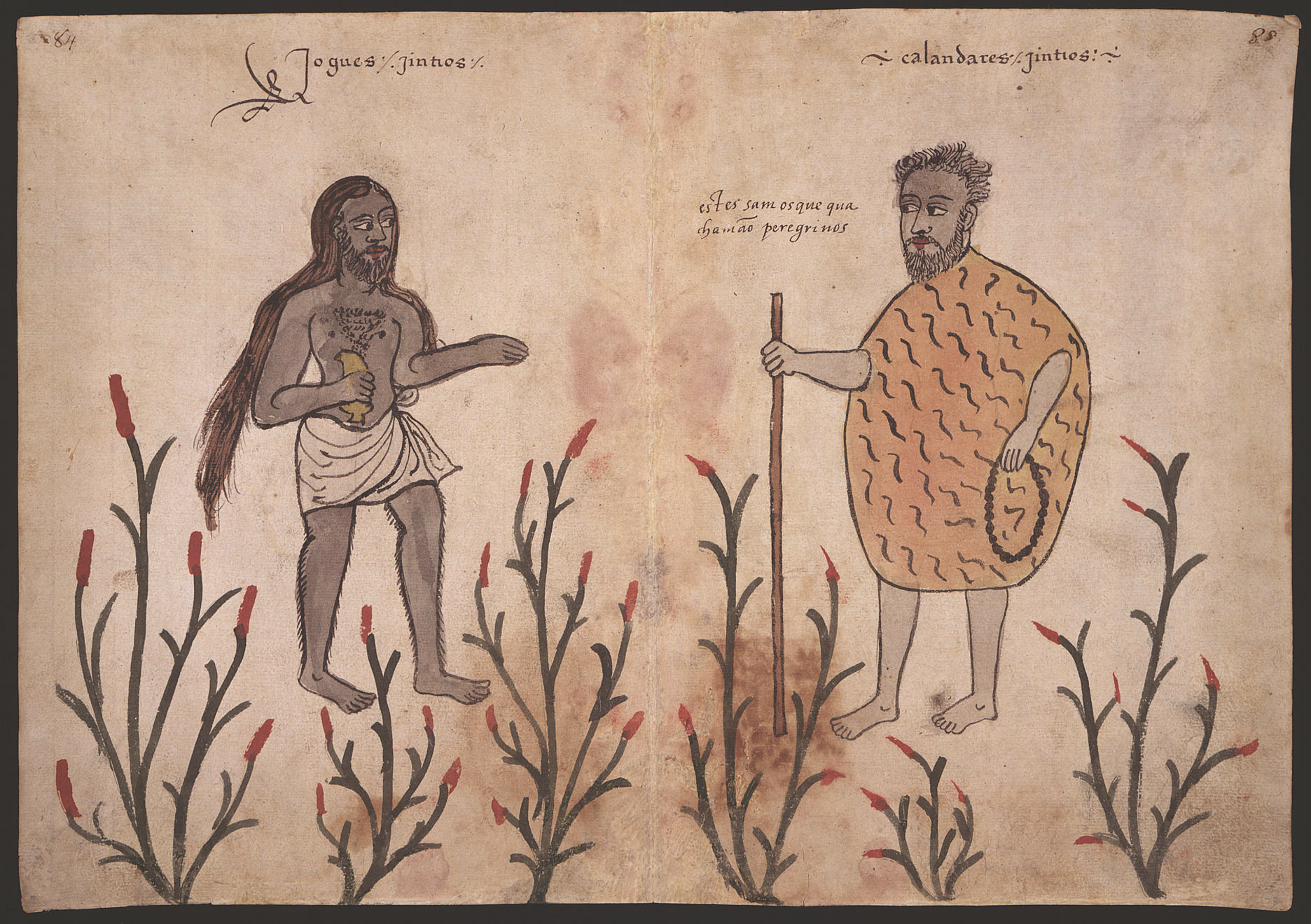
Hindu pilgrims and roving holy men

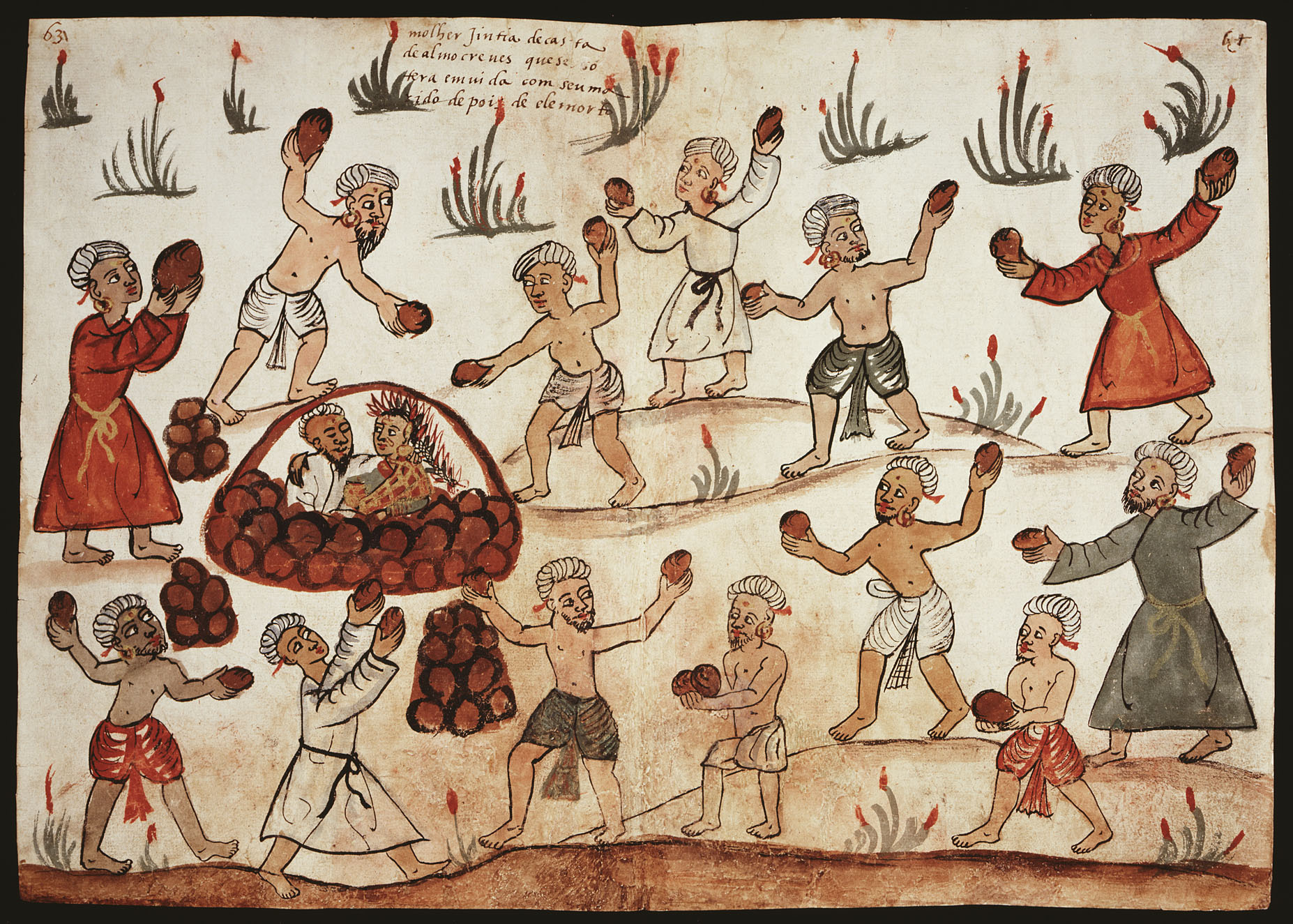
Burial of a living widow

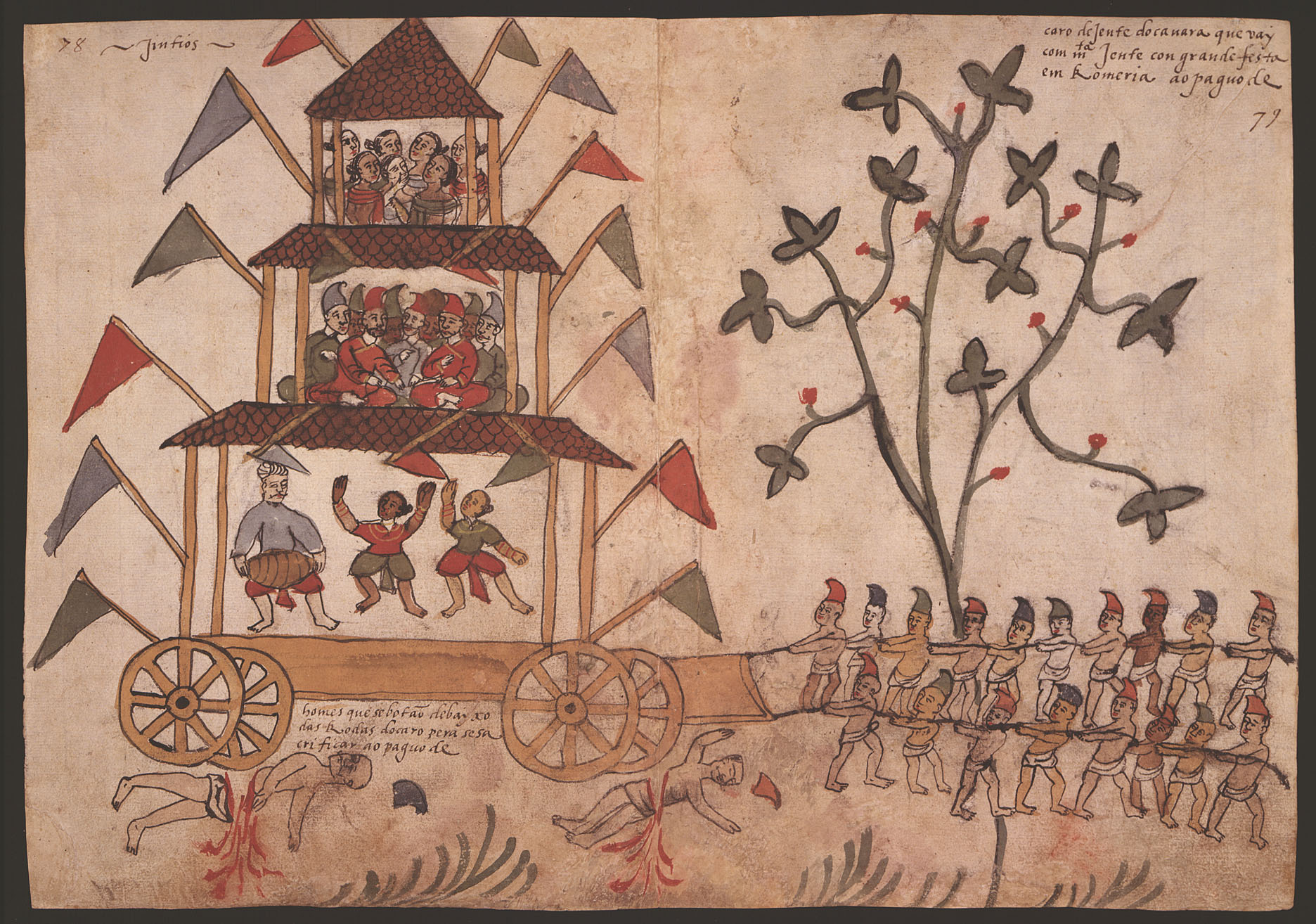
Hindu temple car, crushing a worshiper

=== The Portuguese in Asia ===
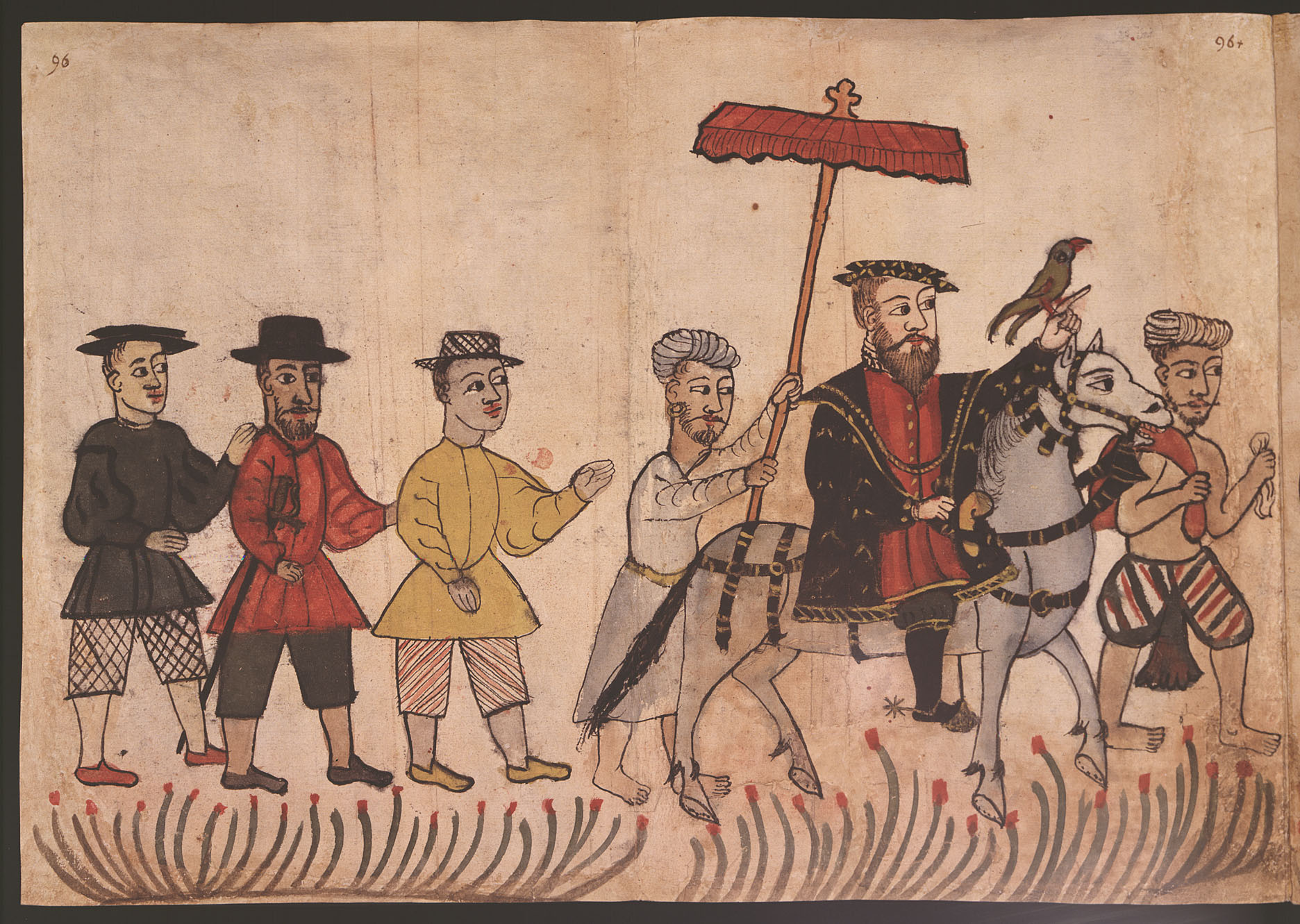
A Portuguese nobleman with his retinue in India

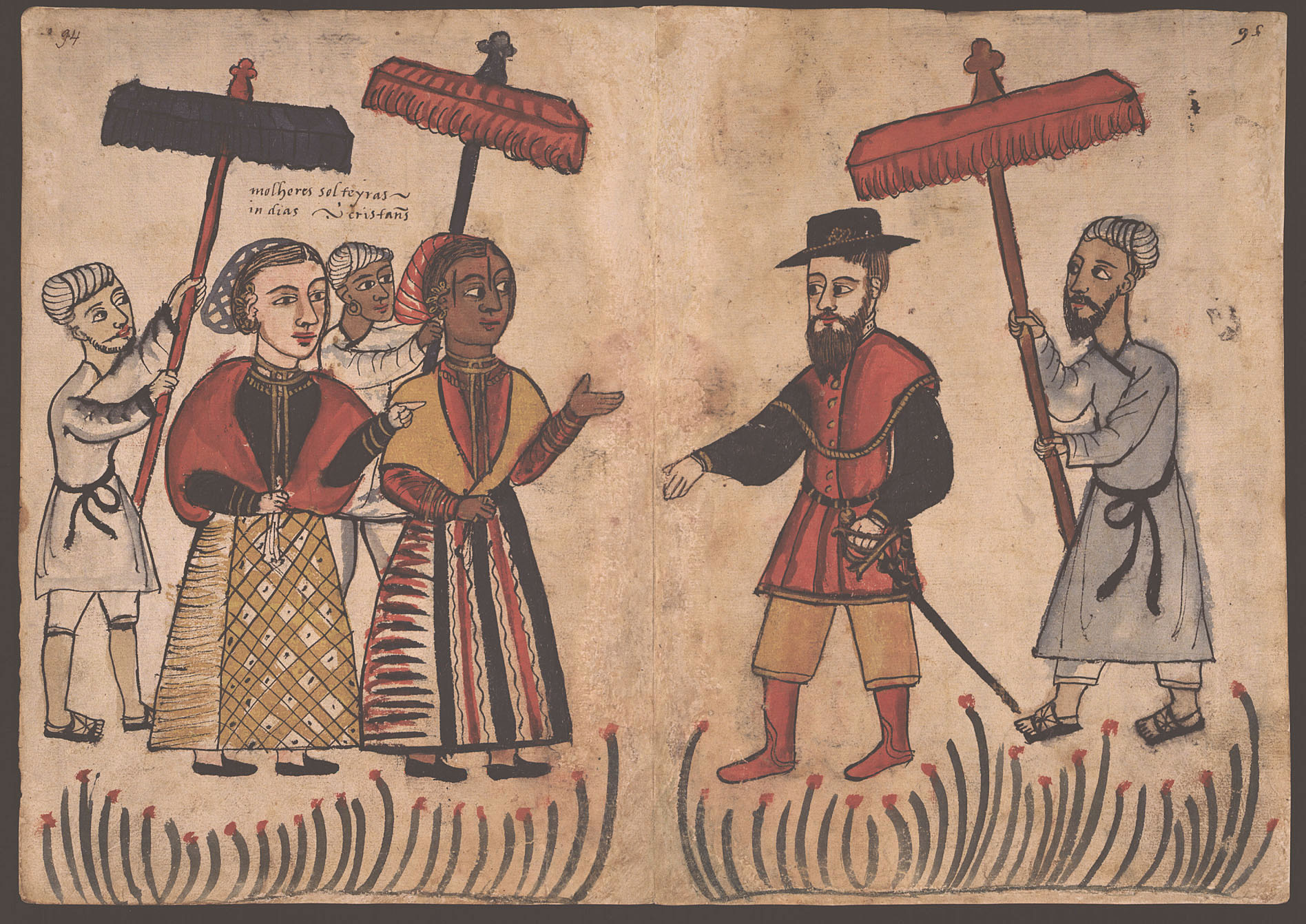
"Single Christian women of India" wearing European fashion, and a Portuguese nobleman, presumably proposing marriage

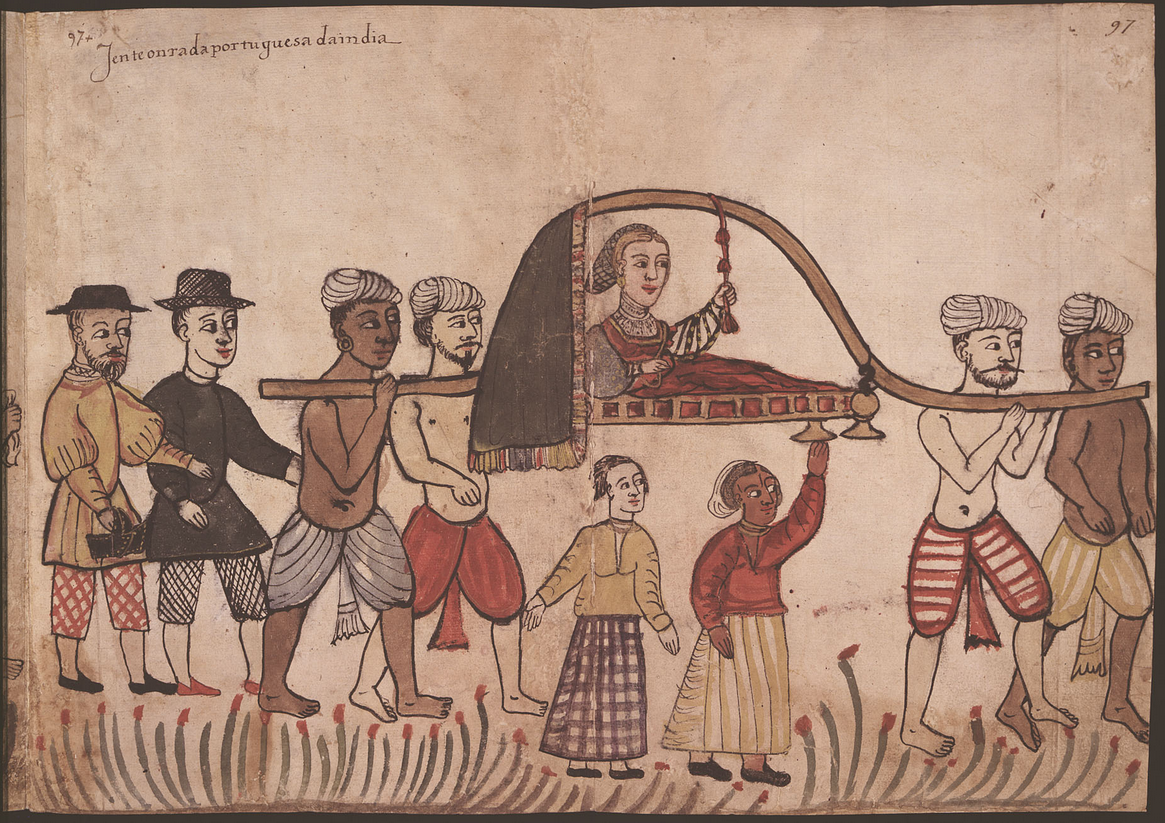
Portuguese noblewoman on a palanquin

=== Fauna and flora ===
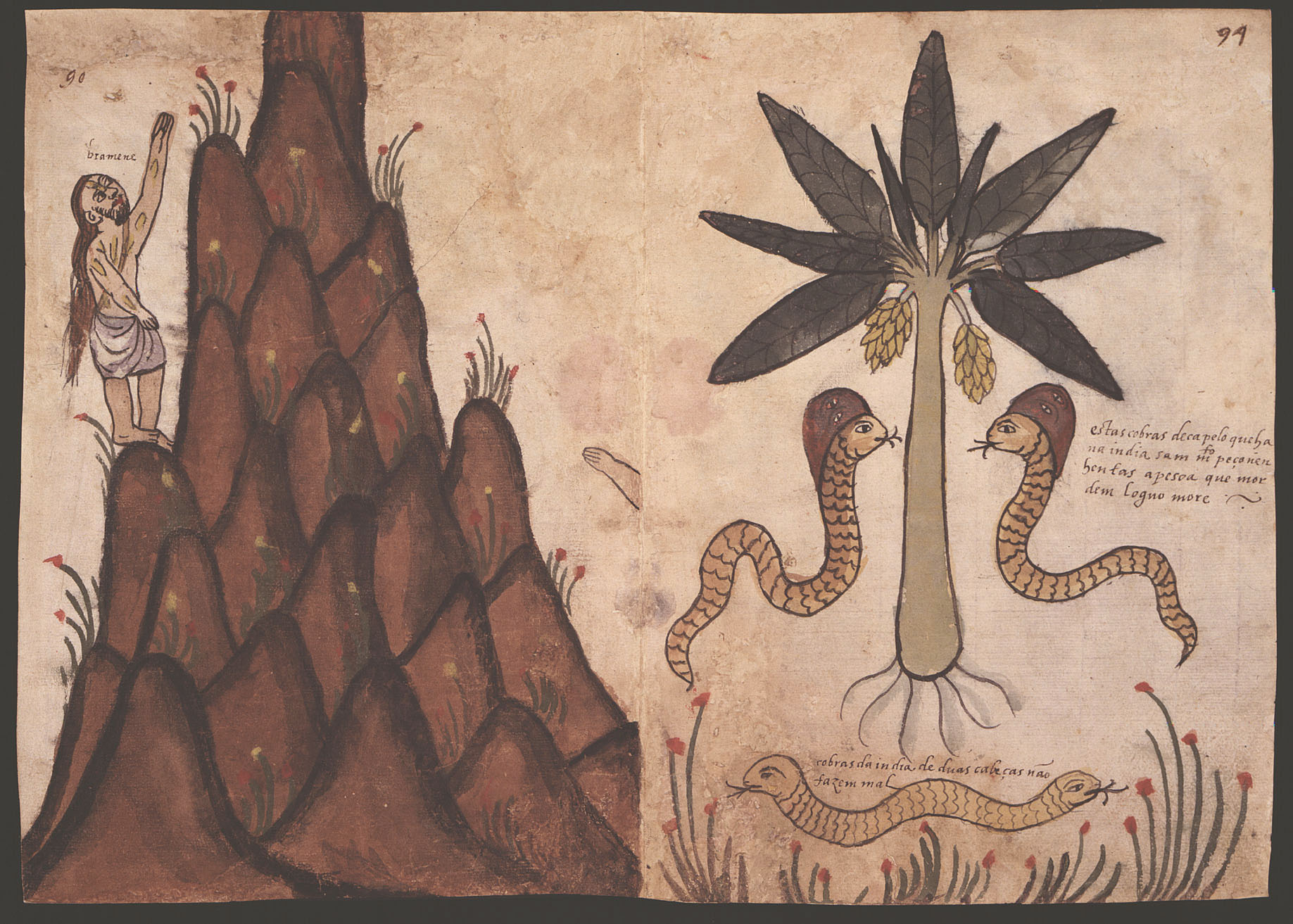
Illustration of a Naja snake and a mysterious two-headed snake

== See also ==
- Miniature (illuminated manuscript)
- Boxer Codex
- Tipos del País
- Ottoman miniature
- Persian miniature
- Mughal painting
