= Portuguese India =

State of the Portuguese Empire (1505–1961)

Coordinates: 2°11′20″N 102°23′4″E

State of India Estado da Índia (Portuguese)
- 1505–1961
- Flag (1911–1961) Coat of arms (1935–1961)
- Anthem: Hymno Patriótico (1808–1826) "Patriotic Anthem" Hino da Carta (1826–1911) "Hymn of the Charter" A Portuguesa (1911–1961) "The Portuguese"
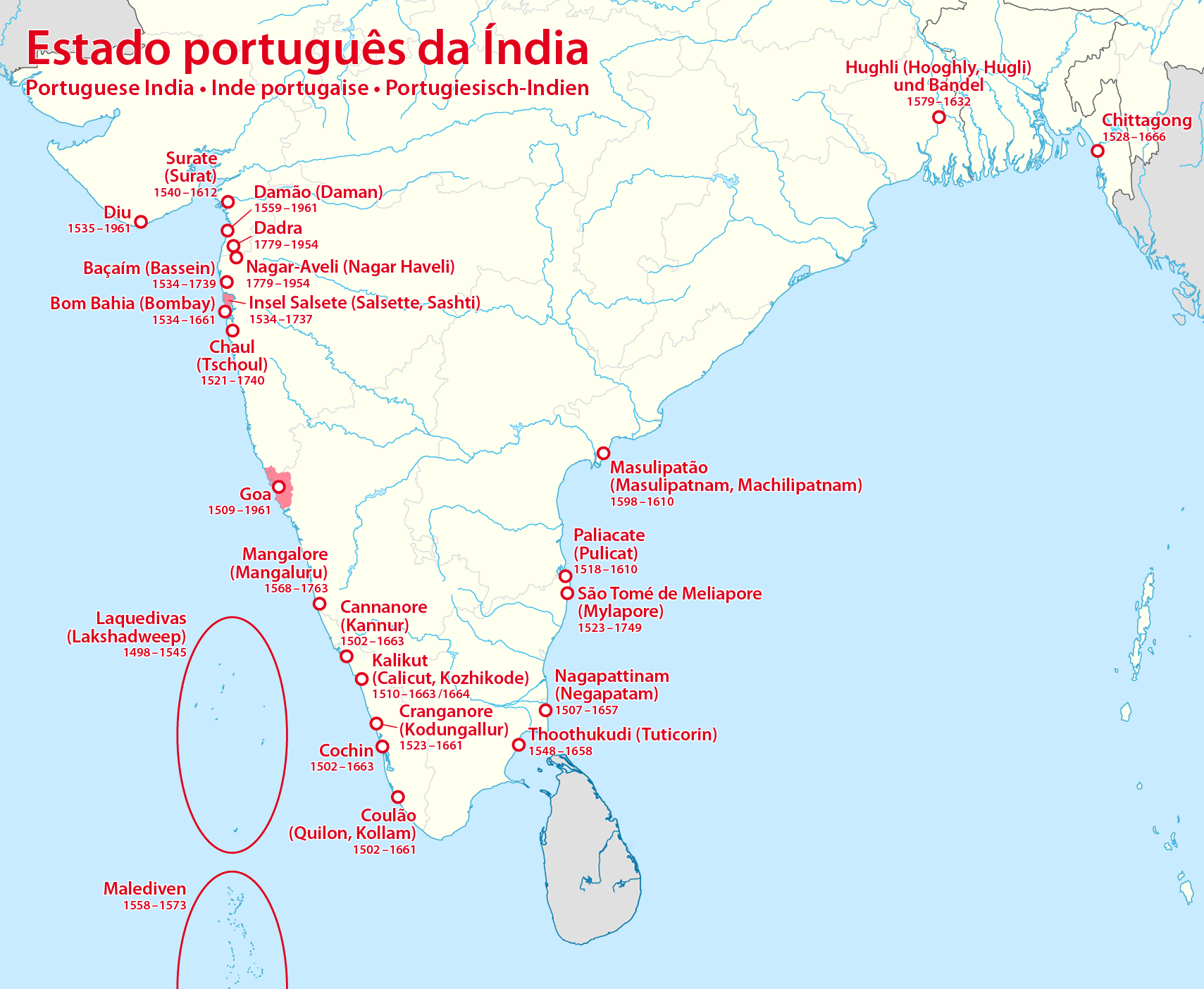
- Status: State of Portugal (1505–1951); Overseas province of Portugal (1951–1961)
- Capital: Cochin (1505–1530); Velha Goa (1530–1843); Nova Goa (1843–1961)
- Official language: Portuguese
- Common languages: Bengali; European Portuguese; Gujarati; Indo-Portuguese; Kannada; Konkani; Malayalam; Marathi; Tamil
- Religion: Official: Roman Catholicism; Major: Hinduism; Islam; Minor: Zoroastrianism; Judaism; Protestantism
- Head of state
  - 1505–1521: Manuel I of Portugal
  - 1958–1961: Américo Tomás
- Governor
  - 1505–1509: Francisco de Almeida (first)
  - 1958–1961: Manuel António Vassalo e Silva (last)
- Historical era: Imperialism
  - Establishment: 15 August 1505
  - Indian annexation: 19 December 1961

Area
  - Total: 4,305 km^{2} (1,662 sq mi)
- Currency: Portuguese Indian rupia (INPR); Portuguese Indian escudo (INPES)
Preceded by
Kingdom of Cochin
Bijapur Sultanate
Gujarat Sultanate
Ahmednagar Sultanate
Malacca Sultanate
Hormuz
Sundem
Maratha Empire
Thanjavur Nayak kingdom
Succeeded by
Goa, Daman and Diu
Free Dadra and Nagar Haveli
Dutch Coromandel
Dutch Malabar
British India
- Today part of: India; Bangladesh; Maldives

The State of India, (Note: Portuguese: Estado da Índia [ɨʃˈtaðu ðɐ ˈĩdiɐ]) also known as the Portuguese State of India (Note: Portuguese: Estado Português da Índia) or Portuguese India, (Note: Portuguese: Índia Portuguesa) was a state of the Portuguese Empire founded seven years after the discovery of the sea route to the Indian subcontinent by Vasco da Gama, a subject of the Kingdom of Portugal. The capital of Portuguese India served as the governing centre of a string of military forts and maritime ports scattered along the coasts of the Indian Ocean.

Francisco de Almeida, the first viceroy, established his base of operations at Fort Manuel in the Malabar region, after the Kingdom of Cochin negotiated to become a protectorate of Portugal in 1505. With the Portuguese conquest of Goa from the Bijapur Sultanate in 1510, Goa became the major anchorage for the Armadas arriving in India. The capital of the viceroyalty was transferred from Cochin to Goa in 1530. From 1535, Mumbai (Bombay) was a harbour of Portuguese India, known as Bom Bahia, until it was ceded to Charles II of England in 1661 as part of the dowry of Catherine de Braganza. The expression "State of India" began regularly appearing in documents in the mid-16th century.

Until the 18th century, the viceroy in Goa had authority over all Portuguese possessions in and around the Indian Ocean, from Southern Africa to Southeast Asia. In 1752, Mozambique was granted its own separate government; from 1844 on, Portuguese Goa stopped administering Macao, Solor and Timor; and became an actual province of Portugal. Despite this, the viceroy at Goa only controlled limited portions of the Portuguese settlements in the east; some settlements remained informal private affairs, without a captain or câmara (municipal council). By the end of the 18th century, most of these unofficial colonies were abandoned by Portugal, due to heavy competition from European and Indian rivals.

In later years, Portugal's authority was confined to holdings in the Canara, Cambay and Konkan regions along the west coast of India. At the time of the dissolution of the British Raj in 1947, Portuguese India comprised three administrative divisions, sometimes referred to collectively as Goa: Goa (which included Anjediva Island), Damaon (which included the exclaves of Dadra and Nagar Haveli) and Dio district. The Salazar regime of Portugal lost de facto control of Dadra and Nagar Haveli in 1954. Finally, the rest of the overseas territory was lost in December 1961 with the Indian Annexation of Goa under Jawaharlal Nehru. Portugal only recognised Indian control after the Carnation Revolution and the fall of the Estado Novo regime, in a treaty signed on 31 December 1974.

== Context ==
=== Vasco da Gama lands in India ===
The first Portuguese encounter with the subcontinent was on 20 May 1498, when Vasco da Gama reached Calicut, now Kozhikode, on the Malabar Coast. Anchored off the coast of Calicut, the Portuguese invited native fishermen on board and bought some Indian items. One Portuguese convict accompanied the fishermen to the port and met with a Tunisian Muslim, who greeted him in Castilian Spanish, saying, "May the Devil take you! What brought you here?" On the advice of this man, Gama sent a small group of his men to Ponnani to meet with the ruler of Calicut, the Zamorin. Over the objections of Arab merchants, Gama managed to secure a letter of concession for trading rights from the Zamorin, but the Portuguese were unable to pay the prescribed customs duties and price of his goods in gold.

Later, Calicut officials temporarily detained Gama's Portuguese agents as security for payment. This angered Gama, who captured several natives and sixteen fishermen, whom he took with him by force.

Da Gama left for Portugal in August 1498, landing in January 1499. Whilst the valuable items he brought back with him were few, they ignited a "fever of excitement and activity" at the opportunities for wealth that they represented.

=== Pedro Álvares Cabral ===
Pedro Álvares Cabral sailed to India to trade for black pepper and other spices and arrived at Calicut on 13 September 1500, where he established a factory. When Cabral seized a ship belonging to a resident of the city as part of a dispute with the Zamorin, the factory was attacked by the city's residents, resulting in the deaths of more than fifty Portuguese. Cabral was outraged by the attack on the factory and seized ten Arab merchant vessels anchored in the harbor, killing about six hundred of their crew, confiscating their cargo, and burning the ships. Cabral also ordered his ships to bombard Calicut for an entire day in retaliation for the violation of the agreement.

Despite Cabral's use of mass violence, he succeeded in making advantageous treaties with local rulers in Cochin and Cannanore. Cabral embarked upon his return voyage on 16 January 1501 and arrived in Portugal on 23 June 1501 with only 4 of the 13 ships with which he had begun the journey.

=== João da Nova ===
The third Portuguese expedition to reach India sailed under the command of João da Nova and was composed of four ships, tasked mainly with acquiring spices and returning to Europe. While en route, the fleet discovered the islands of Ascension and Saint Helena in the South Atlantic. Despite the voyage having been planned as a purely commercial expedition, the fleet clashed with vessels belonging to the Zamorin off the shore of Calicut in the First Battle of Cannanore, the first significant naval battle of Portuguese India.

In 1502, Portuguese traders, not known to be associated with da Nova, built a trading post in Pulicat, its location at the mouth of a lagoon making it an advantageous natural harbour.

=== Vasco da Gama ===
Vasco da Gama sailed to India for the second time with 15 ships and 800 men, arriving at Calicut on 30 October 1502. On this occasion, Gama made a call to expel all Muslims from Calicut, which was rejected. The ruler showed willingness to sign a treaty, but Gama bombarded the city and captured several rice vessels after he was informed that the Zamorin was messaging neighbouring rulers to join him in resisting the Portuguese. While in India, Gama also attacked and plundered Honnavar, threatened Bhatkal into agreeing to become a tributary state, established a trade treaty and trading post at Cananore, and clashed with a fleet belonging to the Zamorin at the Battle of Calicut of 1503. He returned to Portugal in September 1503.

=== Afonso de Albuquerque ===
The expedition of 1503 was the first time its commander Afonso de Albuquerque sailed to India. Its activities were limited to erecting a fort on the territory of the allied kingdom of Cochin, signing a peace with the Zamorin which would be broken within the year, and opening a new trading post at Kollam.

=== Lopo Soares de Albergaria ===
The sixth Portuguese expedition to India was commanded by Lopo Soares de Albergaria, who bombarded Calicut, relieved Duarte Pacheco Pereira and the Portuguese garrison at Cochin defending the territory from a large attack by the Zamorin at the Battle of Cochin, sacked Cranganore, struck an allegiance with the king of Tanur which removed him from the suzerainty of the Zamorin, and finally captured a large Egyptian trade fleet at the Battle of Pandarane.

== Foundation (1505–1515) ==
=== Francisco de Almeida ===
On 25 March 1505, Francisco de Almeida was appointed Viceroy of India by Manuel I of Portugal, on the condition that he would set up four forts on the southwestern Indian coast: Anjediva, Cannanore, Cochin and Quilon. Almeida left Portugal with a fleet of 22 vessels carrying 1,500 men that same day.

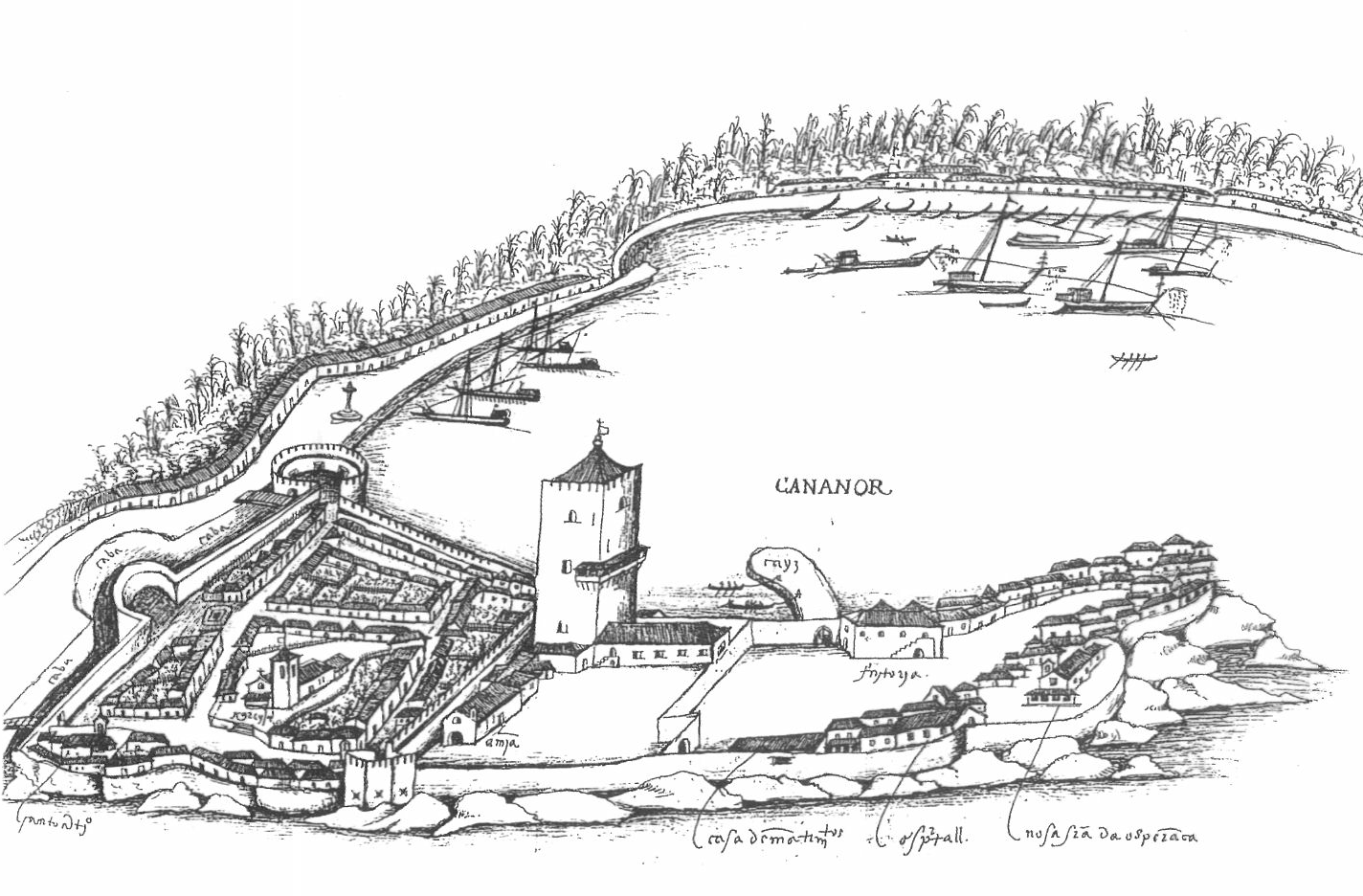
The Portuguese fortress of Cannanore in the allied Kingdom of Cannanore.

On 13 September, Almeida reached Anjadip Island, where he started the construction of Fort Anjediva. On 23 October, with the permission of the friendly ruler of Kolattunādu, he started building Fort St Angelo of Cannanore, leaving Lourenço de Brito in charge with 150 men and two ships.

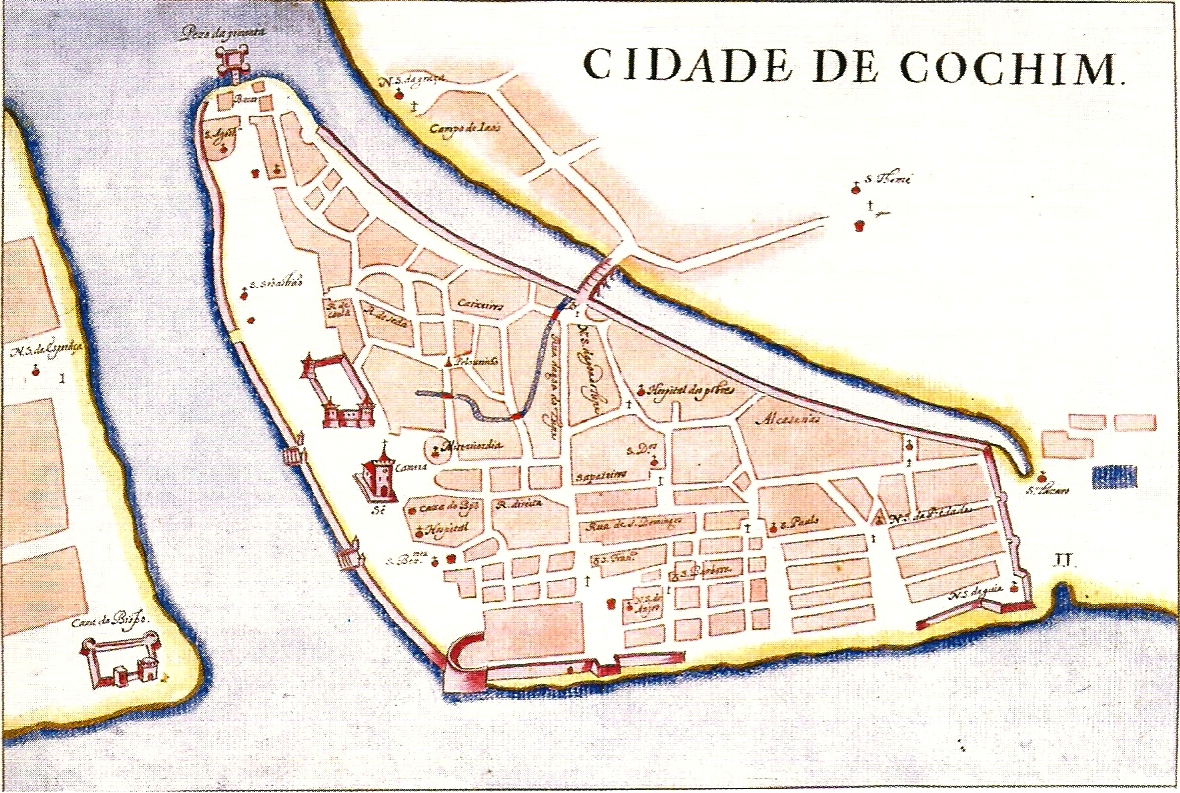
Portuguese Fortress of Cochin, in the allied Kingdom of Cochin

On 31 October 1505, Almeida reached Cochin with only eight vessels left in the fleet. There, he learned that the Portuguese traders at Quilon had been killed. He decided to dispatch his son Lourenço de Almeida to exact vengeance. With six ships, Lourenço destroyed 27 Calicut vessels in Quilon's harbour. Almeida took up residence in Cochin and strengthened Fort Manuel.

The Zamorin prepared a fleet of 200 ships to oppose the Portuguese, but in March 1506, Lourenço de Almeida was victorious in the Battle of Cannanore (1506), forcing the Zamorin to retreat, though leaving most of his fleet intact. Lourenço de Almeida went on to explore the coastal waters southwards to Colombo, in what is now Sri Lanka, where he established a treaty with King Parakramabahu VIII. In Cannanore, a new ruler, hostile to the Portuguese and friendly with the Zamorin, attacked the Portuguese garrison, leading to the Siege of Cannanore.

In 1507 Almeida's forces were strengthened by the arrival of Tristão da Cunha's squadron. Afonso de Albuquerque's squadron had split from Cunha's off East Africa and was independently conquering territories in the Persian Gulf to the west.

In March 1508, a Portuguese squadron under the command of Lourenço de Almeida was attacked by a combined Mameluk Egyptian and Gujarat Sultanate fleet at Chaul and Dabul respectively, led by admirals Mirocem and Meliqueaz in the Battle of Chaul. Whilst Lourenço de Almeida died in the battle, Mamluk-Indian resistance was decisively defeated at the Battle of Diu in 1509.

=== Afonso de Albuquerque ===
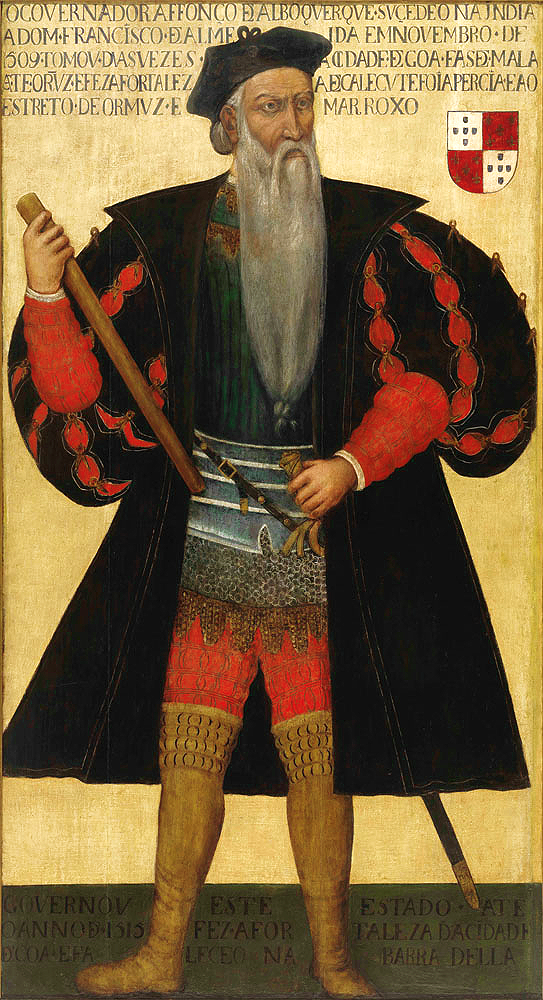
Afonso de Albuquerque, second Portuguese governor of India

In 1509, Afonso de Albuquerque was appointed the second governor of Portuguese possessions in the East. After acquiring their first protectorate in Portuguese Cochin, a new fleet under Marshal Fernão Coutinho arrived with specific instructions to destroy the power of the Zamorin of Calicut. The Zamorin's palace was captured and destroyed, and the city was set on fire. The Zamorin's forces rallied, killing Coutinho and wounding Albuquerque, prompting Albuquerque to withdraw with his forces. Alberquerque then conspired with the Zamorin's brother to have him assassinated in 1513, whereupon he entered into agreement with the usurping successor to protect Portuguese interests in Malabar, and to allow the construction of a fort in Calicut.

In 1510, Albuquerque captured Goa from the Bijapur Sultanate sultan with the aid of the Hindu privateer Timoja, leading to the establishment of a permanent settlement in the city of Velha Goa (Old Goa in English). Old Goa became the seat of the viceroy, who governed all the Portuguese possessions in Asia.

Albuquerque added to the State of India the cities of Malacca in 1511 and Ormus in 1515. To enforce his power over the growing empire's population, the great majority of which was not Portuguese, Albuquerque resorted to medieval Iberian procedures: people of different religions were allowed to live by their own laws under representatives of their respective communities. An exception was made for the practice of sati, which was abolished, along with certain taxes due to the Sultan of Bijapur. Albuquerque encouraged the settlement of his soldiers and their marriage to native women, offering financial incentives for those who did; within two months, there were 200 such casados ("married men") in Goa, and by the mid-16th century, there were about 2000.

Albuquerque's policies led to the granting of property rights to Goan women, and the institution of an orphan's fund and a hospital, the Hospital Real de Goa, modelled after the grand Hospital Real de Todos os Santos in Lisbon. Smaller hospitals were also built, run by the city's charity, the Misericórdia, dedicated to serving the poor and locals.

Albuquerque's policies, particularly his disruption of Muslim dominance over trade in the Indian Ocean, won him the loyalty of the Hindu population of the city. When Albuquerque died in sight of Goa in 1515, the Hindu community of Goa mourned his passing alongside the Portuguese. His tomb at the Nossa Senhora da Serra hermitage was converted to a shrine by the local populace, who would leave flowers there in his dedication and direct prayers to him, seeking aid in matters of justice, until his remains were returned to Portugal in 1566.

== 16th to 17th century ==
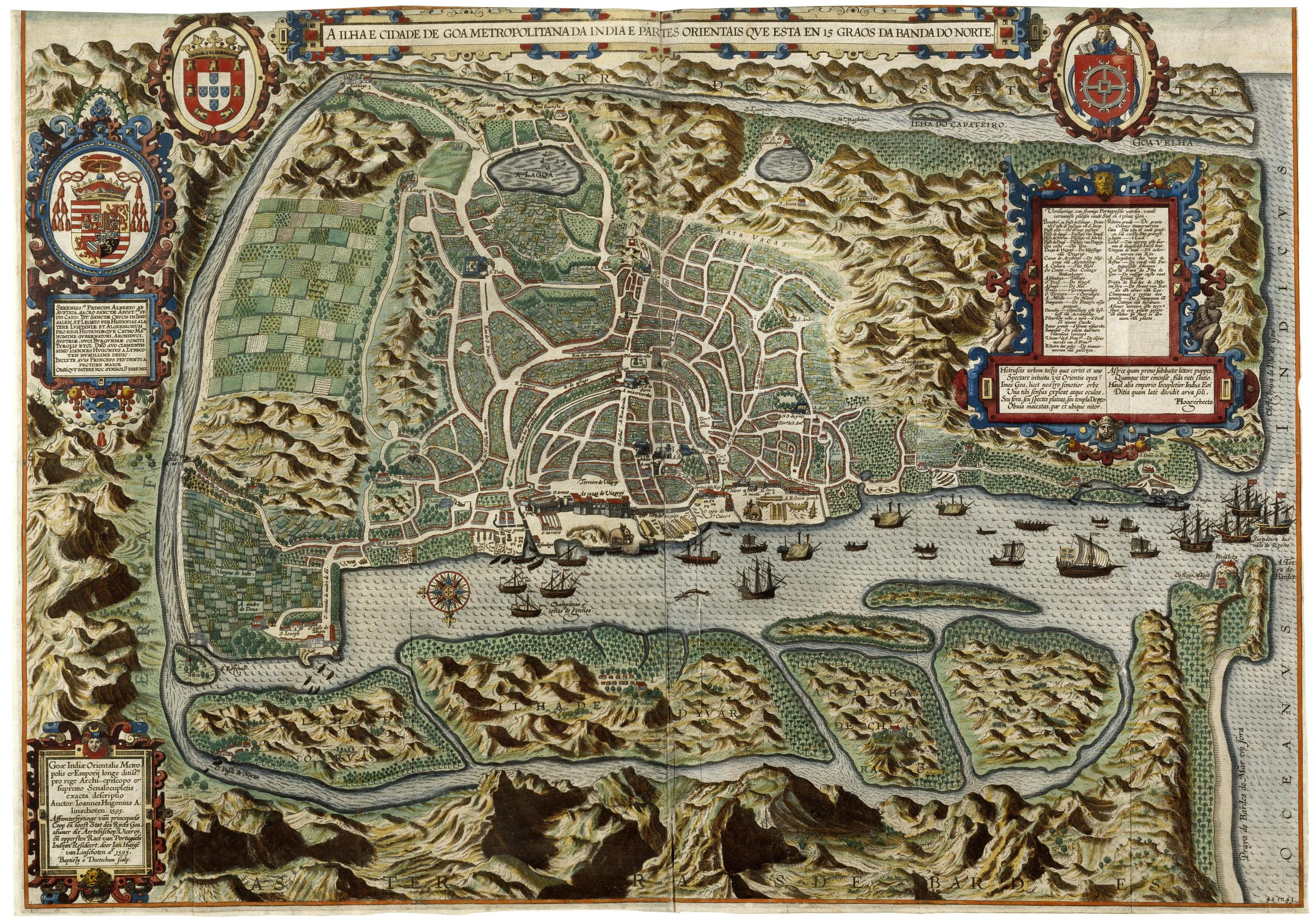
Portuguese Goa in 1600

In 1520, the Portuguese extended their dominion over the town of Rachol when Krishnadevaraya captured Rachol Fort and delivered it to the Portuguese in exchange for a mutual defence pact against the Deccan Sultanates.

In 1526, John III of Portugal granted the city of Goa and its town hall the same legal status as Lisbon, in a foral in which the general laws and privileges of the city, its town hall, and the local Hindu community were detailed. This document is of special historical significance, since at the time the native laws of Goa were passed down by oral tradition; the foral is the first time they enter the written historical record.

By 1530 there were Portuguese settlements in and around the Coromandel region. The Luz Church in the Mylapore neighbourhood of Madras (Chennai), built in 1516, was the first in the area built by the Portuguese. The shrine of São Tomé or San Thome, built upon the purported site of his martyrdom, was found by the Portuguese in a state of neglect in 1517; they rebuilt it in 1522.

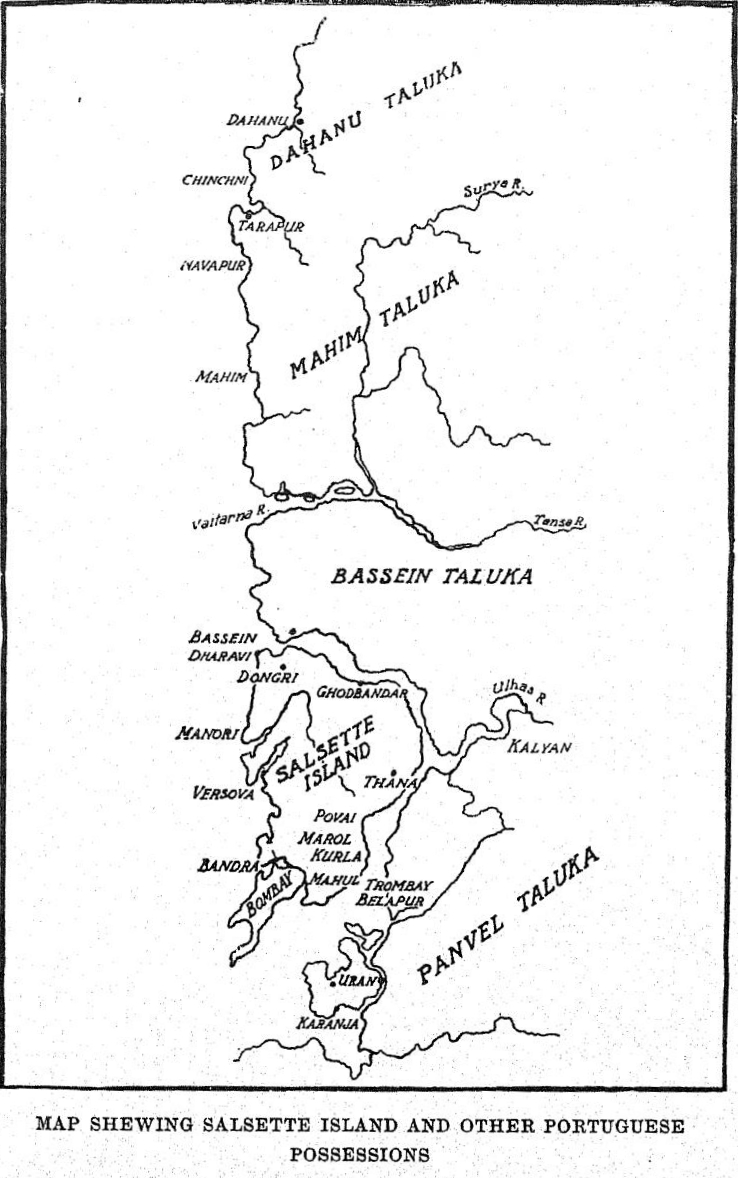
Portuguese territory of Bassein fortress in Gujarat

Several colonies were also acquired from the Sultan of Guzerat in the north Konkan region: Daman was sacked in 1531 and ceded in 1539; Salsette, the seven islands of Bombay, Chaul and Bassein (Vasai) in 1534; and Diu, in 1535. These would jointly come to be known as the Northern Province of Portuguese India. The province extended almost 100 km (62 mi) along the west coast from Daman to Chaul and in some places 30–50 km (19–31 mi) inland. The territory of Portuguese Bombay had its city centre in and around the Bassein Fort; its administrative capital, and the sea of the viceroy, was Velha Goa in south Konkan country. From here, the viceroy exercised imperial power over Goa and Portugal's other colonies in the Indian subcontinent, such as Portuguese Ceylon and Portuguese Chittagong.

The Ottoman Empire laid the Siege of Diu in 1538, with a strong fleet under the command of the Ottoman governor of Egypt Sulaiman Pasha. The siege lasted for four months, with the aid of a large army provided by the Sultan of Guzerat; after a failed assault on the fortress, and in the face of a huge fleet of Portuguese reinforcements, they were ultimately forced to retreat with considerable losses. The successful defence of Dio by captain António da Silveira against overwhelming odds is one of the most celebrated exploits in Portuguese history. During the siege, the Portuguese captured the Tiro de Diu, a massive Guzerati bombard.

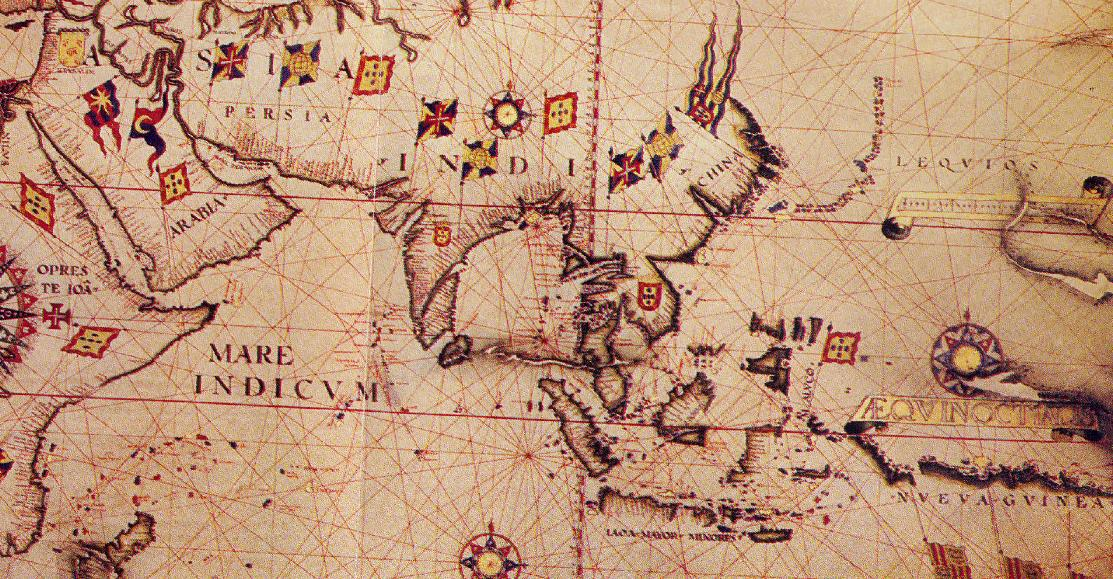
In the 16th and 17th centuries, the Portuguese Empire in the East, with its capital in Goa, was then often styled in Europe as the "Rome of the East"; it included possessions (subjected tracts of land with a certain degree of autonomy) in South Asia, Southeast Asia and East Africa.

A cholera epidemic – the first described by Europeans – swept in Goa in 1543, leading to widespread mortality. According to historian Tim Dyson, "It is said that deaths from the disposal of the disease were so numerous that the disposal of bodies was a formidable task".

As the colony developed, religious freedoms were lessened. John III of Portugal issued an edict on 8 March 1546 to forbid Hinduism and destroy Hindu religious sites, and in 1550 a special religious tax was imposed upon mosques. On 16 May 1546, the Jesuit missionary Francis Xavier, who had been instrumental in a mass conversion of 30,000 Paravar fishermen at Cape Comorin, requested the institution of the Goa Inquisition in a letter to the king; the inquisition was officially established in 1560. Over the course of the next century, the inquisition would bring around 16,000 people to trial, and cause an exodus of non-Christians from Goa; by the end of the 17th century, less than 10% of the Goan population was non-Christians.

The Portuguese fortress of Diu was besieged a second time in 1546 by a joint Ottoman-Gujurati army led by Khoja Zufar. After seven months of siege, the conflict resulted in a major Portuguese victory upon the arrival of a reinforcement fleet under João de Castro.

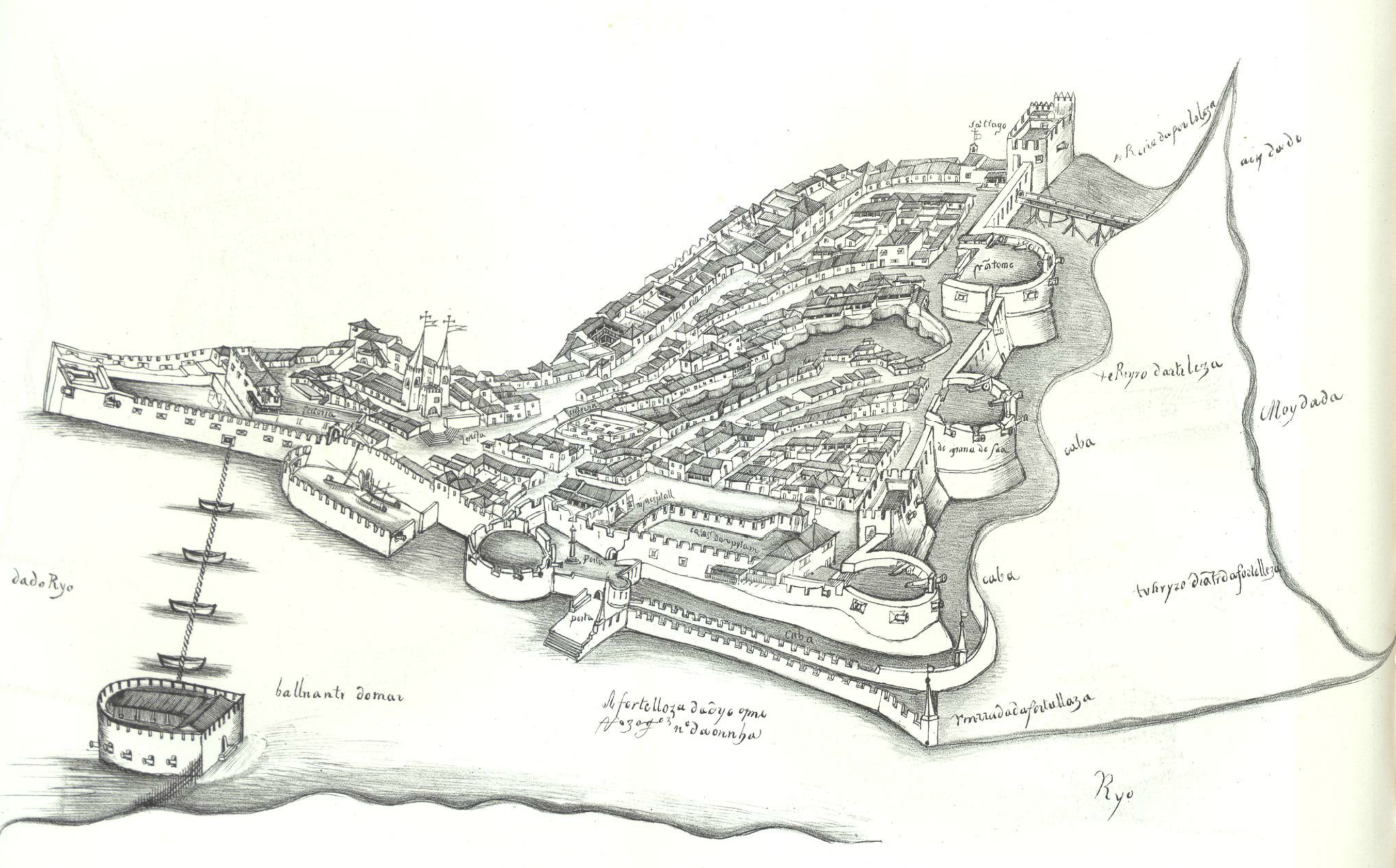
16th-century Portuguese sketch of Diu

In 1556, the printing press in Goa was the first installed in India at Saint Paul's College, Goa by João de Bustamante. The press was used to disseminate religious literature, first in Portuguese and later in Tamil. The development of European-style printing types that could print Indian scripts represented a significant moment in the history of printing in India.

By the start of the 17th century, the population of Goa and the surrounding areas was about 250,000. Holding this strategic land against repeated attacks by the Indian states required constant infusions of men and materiel from Portugal. Portugal's important victories, such as the battle of Cochin in 1504, the defence of Diu in 1509, the conquest of Goa in 1510, the defences of Diu in 1538 and 1546, and the defence of Goa in 1571 were accomplished with limited manpower. In their largest deployments, the Portuguese could field perhaps 2,000 to 3,000 European and mestiço troops supported by a similar amount of local auxiliaries, while the larger Indian states could field tens of thousands each. Portuguese superiority in military technology (especially in ships and artillery), training (especially in the skill of their gunners), and tactics, combined with the disunity of the Indian states opposing them, allowed them to keep their position and consistently win their wars.

== 17th to 20th century ==
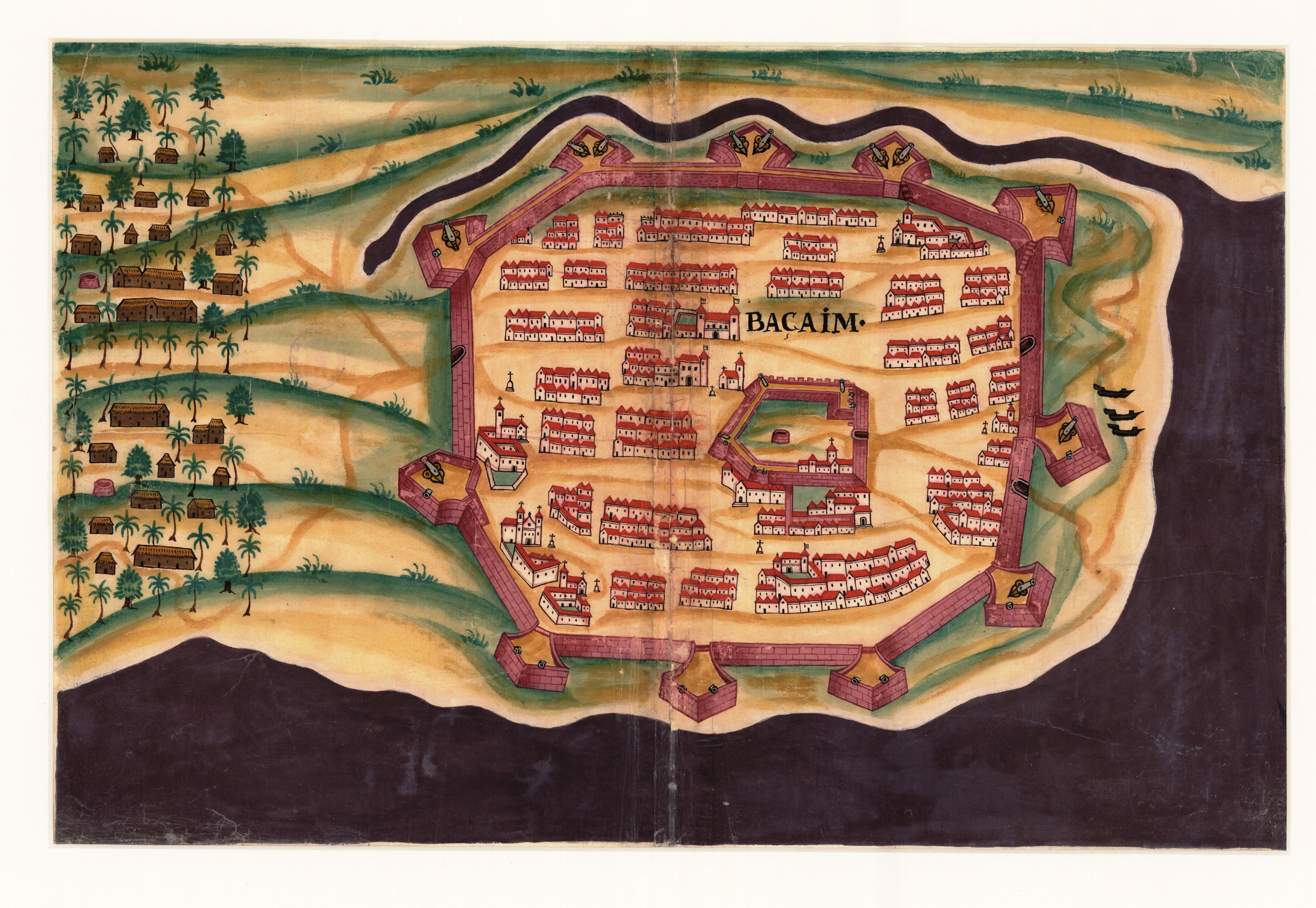
Portuguese fortress of Bassein, centre of the northern province.

=== 17th century ===
The seven islands of Bombay were presented to the English Crown in 1661, as part of the dowry of Catherine Braganza to Charles II of England, who in turn leased the area to the English East India Company.

In 1683, the Maratha Empire invaded Portuguese settlements in the Konkan region. Following Maratha victories in the Battle of Vasai and Siege of Ponda, the Marathas would then besiege Goa. The conflict ended following the 1684 Treaty of Ponda.

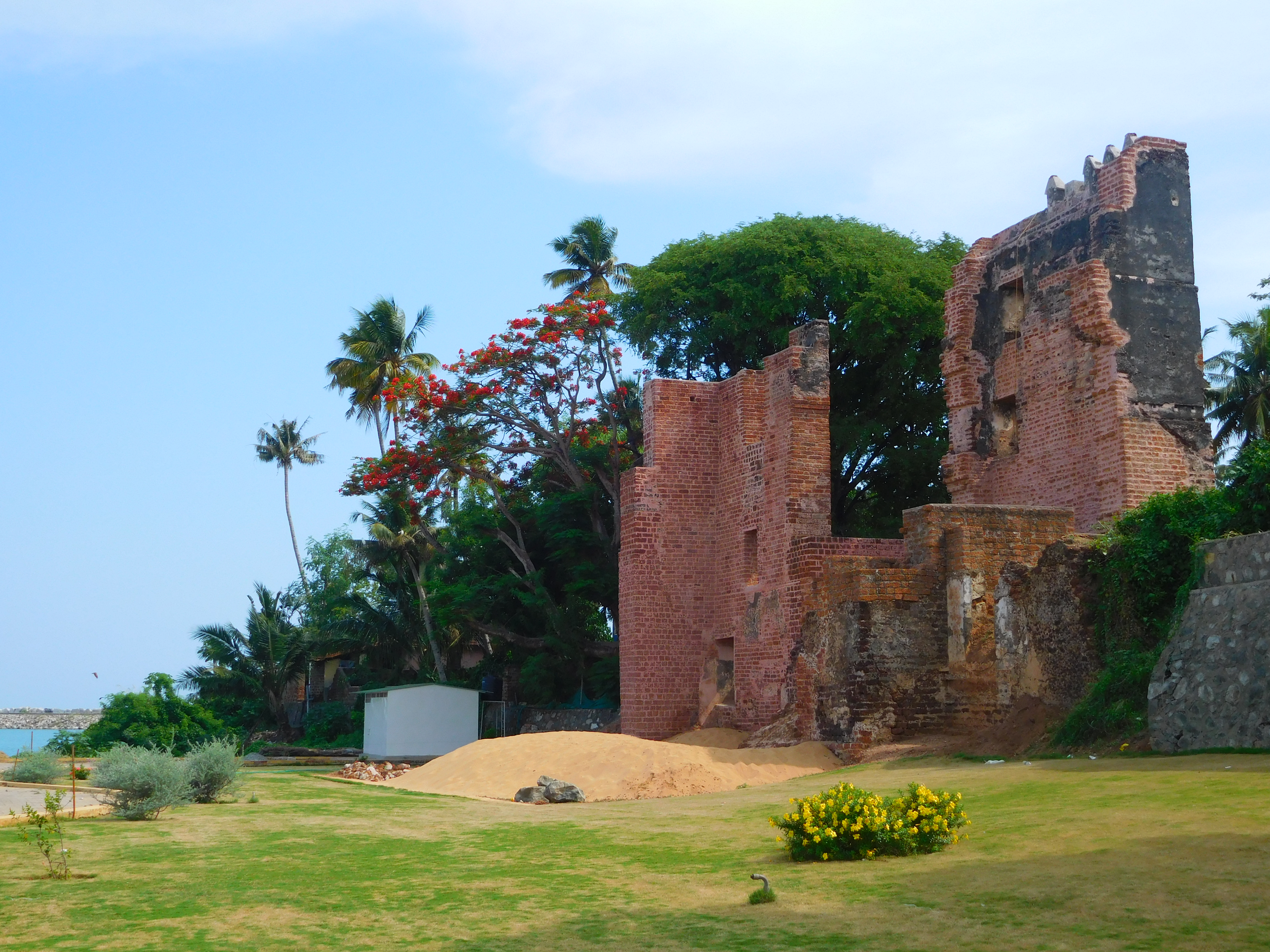
Remnants of St Thomas Fort, Tangasseri in the Quilon area of the Malabar region.

Kollam (Quilon) was a prominent seaport and became a Portuguese settlement in 1519. They built a cemetery at Tangasseri in Quilon city. After the Dutch East India Company invasion, the Dutch also buried their dead there. The pirates of Tangasseri inhabited the cemetery before Europeans arrived. Remnants of this cemetery still exist today, very close to Tangasseri Lighthouse and St Thomas Fort, which are listed among the protected monuments in the Archaeological Survey of India.

=== 18th century ===
Most of the Northern Province, composed of Taana, Bassein (Vasai) and Chaul near British Bombay was lost following another Mahratta Invasion of Bassein in 1739. Goa, Daman and Diu as well as Anjediva, were retained because a fleet of Portuguese Armadas arrived from Lisbon, bearing a newly appointed viceroy.

In 1752, Mozambique was detached from the State of India and henceforth ruled by its own governor.

The Conquistas of Goa. Red: Velhas Conquistas (1510–1546). Cream: Novas Conquistas (1763–1788)

In the aftermath of the battles and the losses, the Portuguese expanded the territory of Goa between 1763 and 1788, at the expense of the Dessais of Kudal, the Sondas, and the Bhonslas/Mahrattas of Silvassa, which became known as the Novas Conquistas. By order of the Marquis de Pombal, the Jesuits were expelled from Portugal's territories in 1759. They were replaced by the Oratorians, a native Goan Catholic religious order founded by Christian Brahmin and Christian Kshatriya converts; a college dedicated to the secular education of the native elites was opened; and the Goan Inquisition was abolished. Under the influence of Pombal, King José declared that native Christians were equal in standing with Europeans, while the Viceroy Count of Ega declared religious freedom and prohibited racial slander. For these reasons, "Pombal and his collaborators remain, to this day, much respected figures in Goa"

In 1783, following an attack on the Portuguese ship Santana, the Marathas handed over control of the territories of Dadrá and Nagar Áveli. The Portuguese then purchased Dadrá in 1785. By 1818, the Portuguese were the undisputed rulers of Nagar Áveli after the dissolution of the Maratha Confederacy.

The Conspiracy of the Pintos, also known as the Pinto Revolt, was a rebellion against Portuguese rule in Goa in 1787. The leaders of the plot were three prominent priests from the village of Candolim in the concelho of Bardez. They belonged to the noble Roman Catholic Brahmin Pinto clan, hence the name of the rebellion. This was the first anti-colonial revolt in India and one of the first by Catholic subjects in all European colonies.

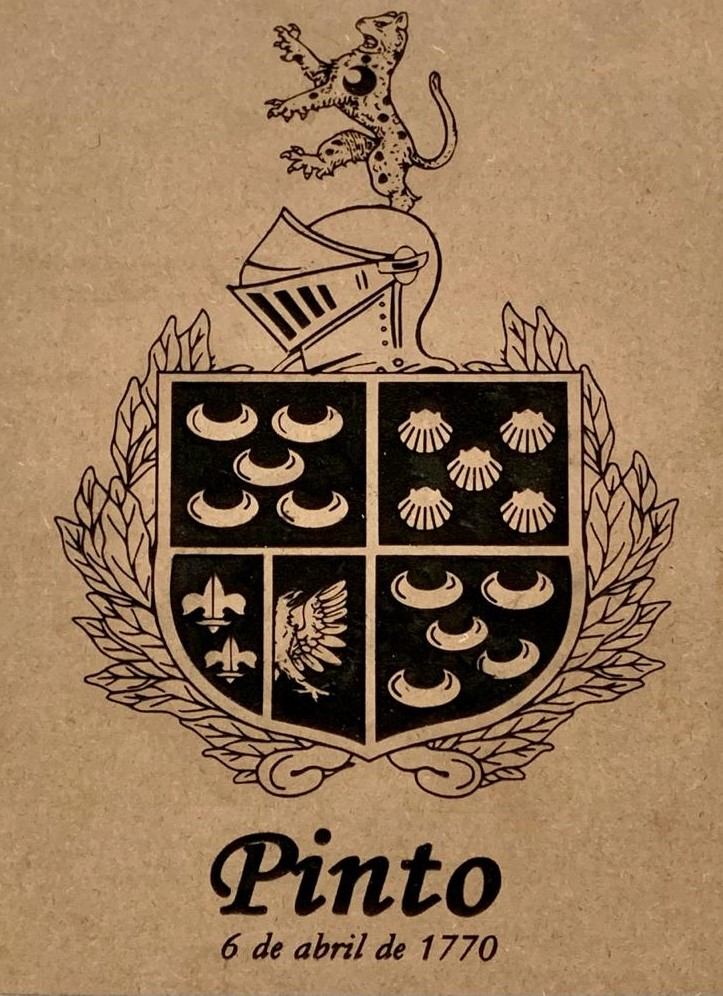
Coat of Arms of the Pintos, awarded by the King of Portugal in 1770

=== 19th century ===
Military intelligence about France's plan to occupy Goa caused the British Governor-general at Calcutta, the Marquis of Wellesley to send troops. Goa was briefly a British Protectorate from 1799 to 1813. The Portuguese governor Francisco António da Veiga Cabral managed to retain control of civil institutions by formally appointing the British officer in charge of the occupation, Sir William Clarke, as commander of Portuguese troops in Goa under his authority.

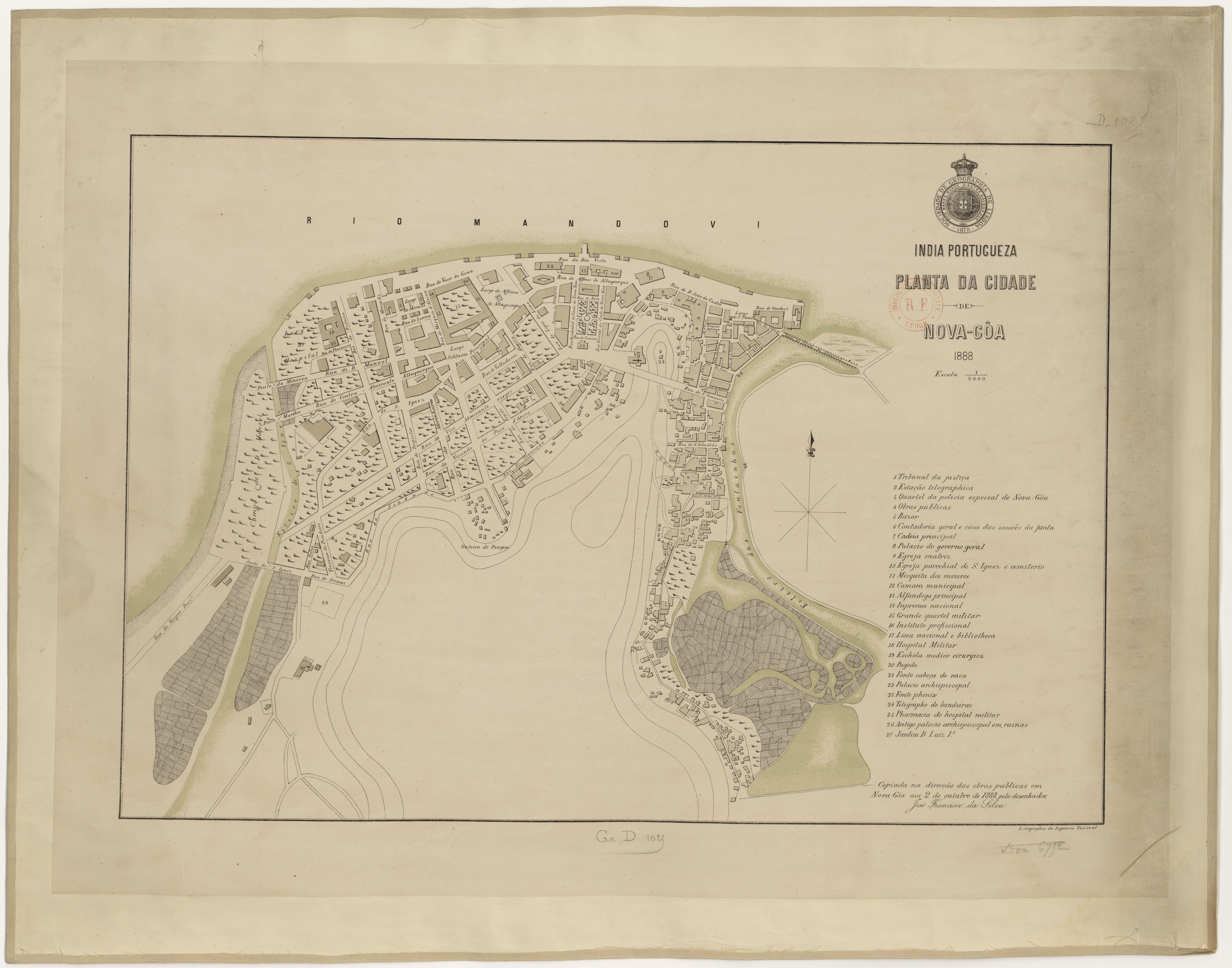
Pangim or New Goa in 1888.

In 1843, the capital was moved to Panjim (Nova Goa or New Goa), when it officially became the administrative seat of the Estado, replacing the city of Velha Goa (Old Goa), although the viceroys had taken residence there already since 1 December 1759. In 1844, the Portuguese governor of India stopped administering the territories of Macão, Solór, and Timór. Only then was the territory of the State of India confined to the Indian subcontinent itself.

=== Second World War ===
Portugal was neutral during the Second World War. As a result, at the outbreak of hostilities, Axis ships sought refuge in Goa rather than be sunk or captured by British forces. Three German merchant ships, the Ehrenfels, the Drachenfels and the Braunfels, as well as an Italian ship, took refuge in the port of Mormugao. The Ehrenfels began transmitting Allied ship movements to the U-boats operating in the Indian Ocean, an action that was extremely damaging to Allied shipping.

The Royal Navy was unable to take any official action against these ships because of Goa's stated neutrality. Instead the Indian mission of Special Operations Executive backed a covert raid using members from the Calcutta Light Horse, a part-time unit made up of civilians who were not eligible for normal war service. The Light Horse embarked on an ancient Calcutta riverboat, the Phoebe, and sailed around India to Goa, where they sank the Ehrenfels. The British then sent an unencrypted radio message announcing it was going to seize the territory. This bluff made the other Axis crews scuttle their ships fearing they could be seized by British forces.

The raid was described in the book Boarding Party by James Leasor. Due to the potential political ramifications of the fact that the raiders had violated Portuguese neutrality, the raid remained secret until the book was published in 1978. In 1980 the story was made into the film, The Sea Wolves, starring Gregory Peck, David Niven and Roger Moore.

=== 1945 to 1961 ===
Proposed flag for Portuguese India

On 24 July 1954 an organisation called "The United Front of Goans" took control of the enclave of Dadra. Nagar Haveli was seized by Azad Gomantak Dal on 2 August 1954. The International Court of Justice at The Hague delivered an impasse verdict, regarding access to Dadra and Nagar Haveli by Portugal.

From 1954, the satyagrahis (peaceful protesters) against Portuguese rule, outside Goa were violently suppressed through brute force. Many internal revolts were quelled and leaders extrajudicially murdered or jailed. As a result, India broke off diplomatic relations with Portugal, closed its consulate-general in Panjim and demanded that Portugal must close its delegation in New Delhi. India also imposed an economic embargo against the territories of Portuguese Goa. The Indian Government adopted a diplomatic "wait and watch" approach from 1955 to 1961 with numerous representations to the Portuguese Salazar dictatorship, and made attempts to highlight the issue of decolonisation before the international community.

To facilitate the transport of people and goods to and from the Indian enclaves, the Salazar dictatorship established an airline, Transportes Aéreos da Índia Portuguesa, and airports at Goa, Daman and Diu.

In December 1961, India invaded the remaining Portuguese possessions. Portuguese forces were ordered to resist the Indian advance. Calling for a last stand around the harbor and according to the accounts of the orders from Lisbon, the destruction of Goa rather than its surrender. The Governor of Portuguese India signed the Instrument of Surrender on 19 December 1961, thus ending 450 years of Portuguese rule in India.

== Post-annexation ==
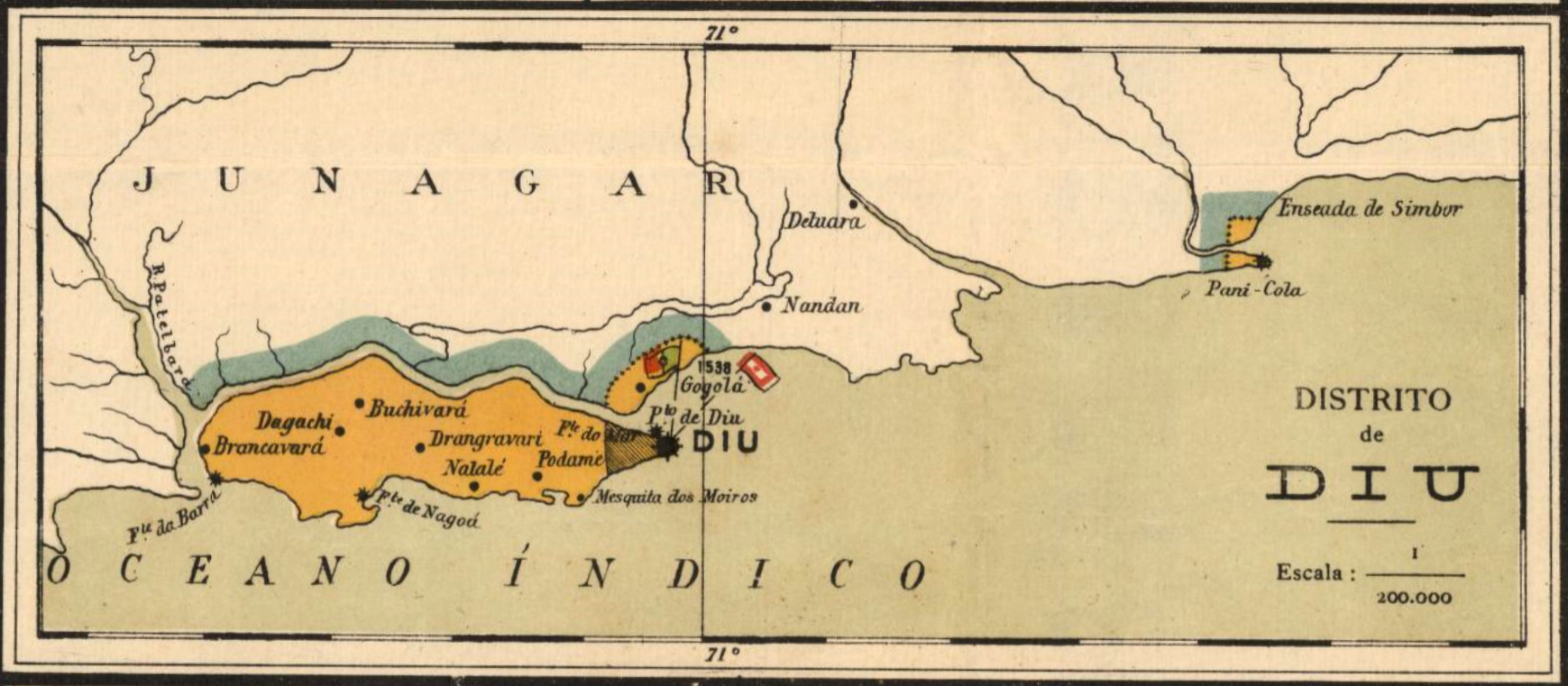
District of Portuguese Diu

=== Status of the new territories ===
Free Dadra and Nagar Haveli existed as a de facto independent entity from its independence in 1954 until its merger with the Republic of India in 1961.

Following the annexation of Dadra and Nagar Haveli, Goa, Daman and Diu became new territories of the Indian Union. Maj Gen K P Candeth was declared as military governor of Goa, Daman and Diu. Goa's first legislative elections were held in 1963.

In 1967 a referendum was conducted after activists led by Jack Sequeira proposed it, where voters would decide whether to merge Goa into the Marathi-majority state of Maharashtra, the pro-Konkani faction eventually won after protests against the Maharashtrawadi Gomantak Party, led by Dayanand Bandodkar. However full statehood was not conferred immediately, and it was only on 30 May 1987 that Goa became the 25th state of the Indian Union, with Dadra and Nagar Haveli, Daman and Diu districts were partitioned, and continue to be administered as the Daman, Diu and Silvassa territory.

The most drastic changes in Portuguese India after 1961 were the introduction of democratic elections, as well as the replacement of Portuguese with English as the general language of government and education. Following many years of Konkani language agitation, Konkani in the Devanagari script finally became the official language of the union territory of Goa, Daman and Diu in 1987. The Indians allowed certain Portuguese institutions to continue unchanged. Amongst these were the land ownership system of the comunidades, where land was held by the community of neighbourhoods was then leased out to individuals. Goans under the Indian Government left the Portuguese Civil Code of Goa and Daman unchanged, hence they remain as the only territories in India with a common civil code that does not depend on religion.

=== Citizenship ===
The Citizenship Act of 1955 granted the Government of India the authority to define citizenship in the Indian Union. In exercise of its powers, the government passed the Goa, Daman and Diu (Citizenship) Order, 1962 on 28 March 1962 conferring Indian citizenship on all persons born on or before 20 December 1961 in Goa, Daman, and Diu.

=== Indo-Portuguese relations ===
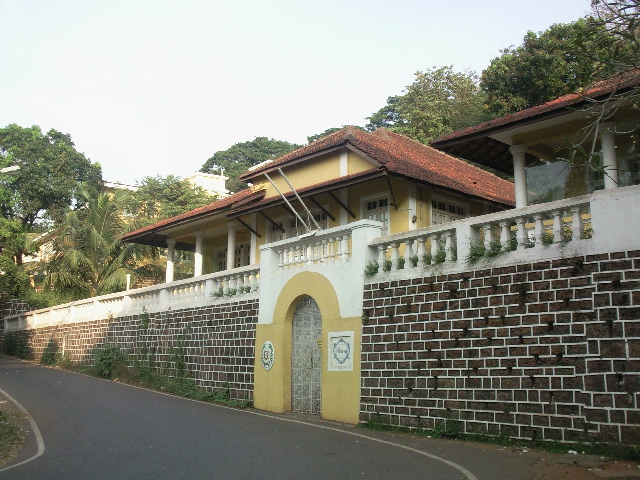
Consulate-general of Portugal in Pangim.

Portugal's Salazar dictatorship did not recognise India's sovereignty over the annexed territories, and established a government-in-exile for the territories, which continued to be represented in the Portuguese National Assembly. After 1974's Carnation Revolution, the new Portuguese government recognised Indian sovereignty over Goa, Daman and Diu, and the two states restored diplomatic relations. Portugal automatically gives citizens of the former Portuguese-India its citizenship and opened a consulate in Goa in 1994.

== Administration ==
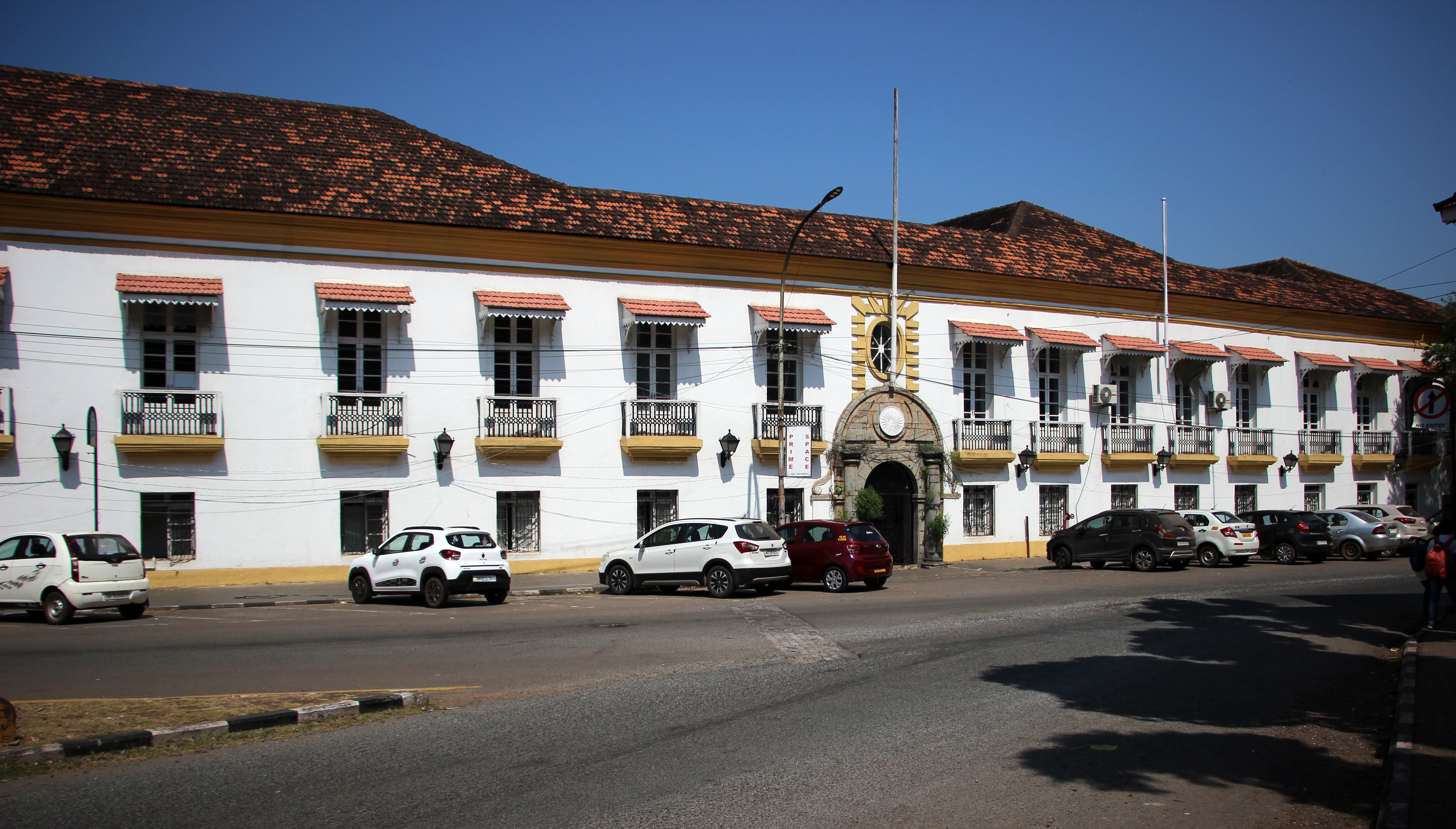
Former palace of the Governors-General (1759–1918).

From the establishment of Portuguese India in 1505 until its disestablishment in 1961, an official with the title of governor or viceroy served as its highest authority, usually for a three-year term, initially with authority over all Crown territories east of the Cape of Good Hope. The latter title was attributed as a high honour while the monarchy lasted, however their duties were the same as governors. They were the highest military commanders as well as administrators, hence their authority fell on matters pertaining to the armed forces, diplomacy, trade, finance and personnel management. Before they left Portugal, they were handed a written set of orders and objectives, called regimento. The viceroys often attempted to influence the nomination of political allies to key positions. However, the final say fell on the metropolis. Many were accompanied by their personal retinues, and these often included their sons to serve in important military positions, such was the case of the captain-major of the seas of India Dom Lourenço de Almeida, son the viceroy Dom Francisco de Almeida. After Goa was conquered, governors and viceroys lived in the Palácio do Hidalcão, the native Indian palace built by the city's former sovereign, the Adil Khan.

The most important administrative structure of the State was put in place in the 16th century; it included the high court (relação), the superintendency of finances (vedoria da fazenda) run by a Crown appointed vedor, financial accounts office (casa dos contos) and the military registry and supply office (casa da matrícula).

The extremely scattered nature of Portuguese holdings however, meant that the State was highly decentralized, with great power being held by individual fortress captains, their captain-generals or town halls, far away from Goa. Like the governors and viceroys, fortress captains served for three years, however their terms could be renovated. Sancho de Vasconcelos, captain-major of Ambon served for 19 years. In the most important captaincies, financial authority rested with the vedor (superintendent), while judicial authority was vested in an ouvidor ("ombundsman").

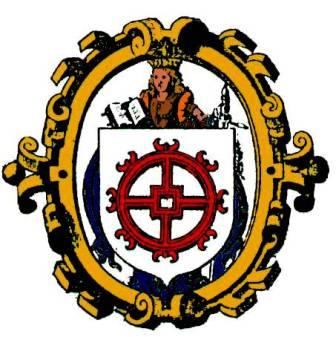
Coat of arms of Portuguese Goa in 1596

The Church played an important role in the State. The Pope had granted the Kings of Portugal exclusive ecclesiastical rights to religious patronage (Padroado) in their overseas possessions. After 1513 Portuguese eastern holdings were part of the bishopric of Funchal seated in Madeira island. After 1557 Goa became the seat of an archbishop with subordinate bishops in Cochin and Malacca. Further sees were later opened in Macau in 1576 and in Funai in 1588. Religious Orders of the Augustinians, Franciscans, Dominicans and Jesuits established mission headquarters in Goa, giving the Catholic Church a very visible presence and influence in the capital of the State of India, for which it earned the nickname of "Rome of the East", a fact commented by many foreign travellers.

In the most important settlements featured a câmara ("town hall"), with charters similar to equivalent cities in Portugal, and they played an important role in administration, as they were the only institution through which settlers could voice their opinions and make themselves heard. They were responsible for local governance, could collect some municipal taxes and acted as a court of first instance. They sometimes provided loans to Viceroys, though cooperation was often difficult. Portuguese merchants often established by their own initiative a câmara in their non-Crown settlements, the most important case of which was the Leal Senado in Macau.

Aside from the Portuguese themselves, the State often also ruled over non-Portuguese, non-Christian peoples, and in these cases often the traditional native structures were left in place. When Afonso de Albuquerque captured Goa, the Hindu inhabitants were left in possession of their lands; the pre-Portuguese system of land-ownership and administration of village communes codified and the rights of Brahmin or Khsatria ganvkars (shareholders) recognized, and tax collection was left to the Hindu Timoja and after him the long-standing Krishna Rao. In Hormuz, Albuquerque left its native Muslim king as chief administrator under a protectorate. As the Counter-Reformation gained momentum in Europe, Brahmins were excluded from the Portuguese administration during the tenure of Dom Constantino de Bragança, which resulted in a wave of conversions.

== Trade and economy ==
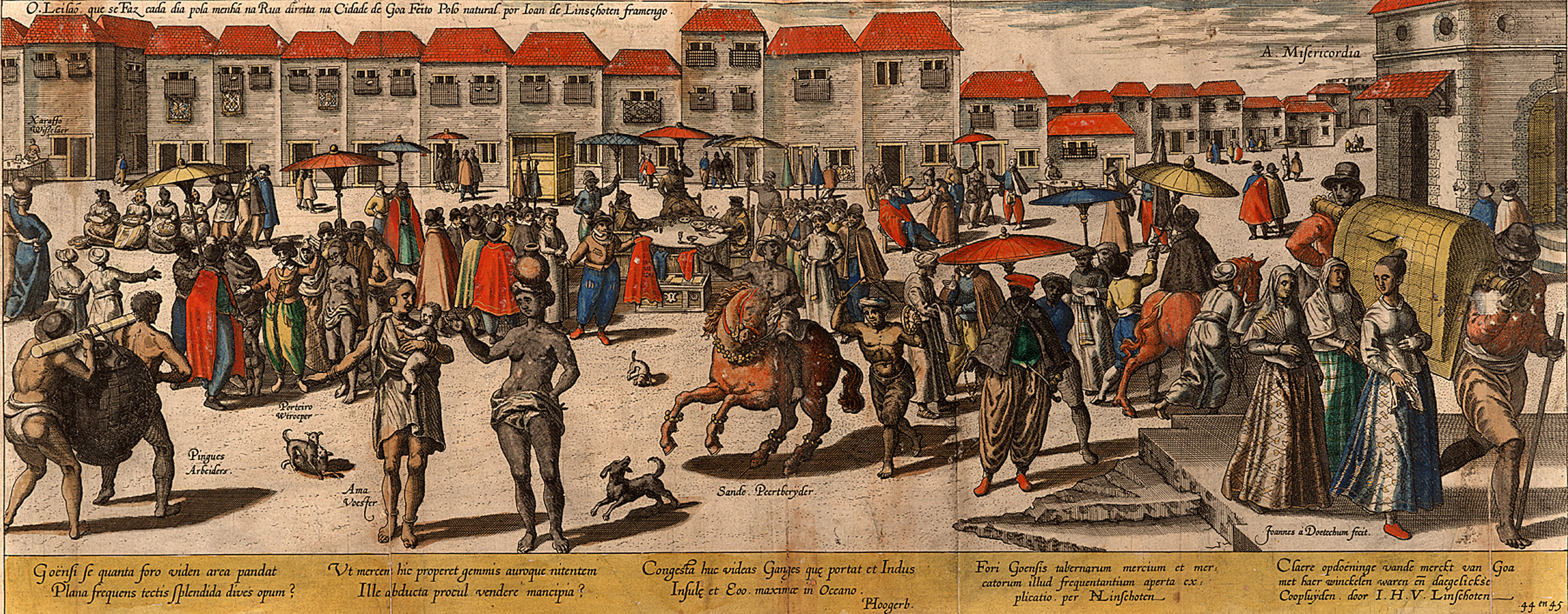
Joannes van Doetecum's 1596 engraving of "The Market of Goa" for Jan Huygen van Linschoten's Itinerario, depicting the main street of Portuguese Goa in the 1580s

Trade had been one of the primary motivations behind the Portuguese expansion overseas, and one of the main objectives behind the foundation of the State of India was to take over the Europe-Asia trade, up to that point conducted mainly through the Red Sea and the Persian Gulf, redirecting it around Africa via the Cape Route. Trade was processed either by the Crown through royal agents (feitores) working from royal trade posts (feitorias) and maintained by the royal finances, or by independent merchants, either Portuguese or otherwise.

One of the main tasks of royal factors was to acquire spices to be shipped back to Europe. In 1503, the Portuguese unloaded at Lisbon 30,000 quintals of spices, more than what the Venetians introduced in the European market through Alexandria in Egypt. The overwhelming bulk of commodities imported to Europe by the Portuguese consisted of black pepper, which after 1520 was declared an official Crown monopoly. The Portuguese acquired most of their pepper in Kerala or Kanara in India. For most of the century, the Portuguese secured an overwhelming share of the pepper imports into Europe, supplying 75 per cent or more of Europes pepper. The Crown declared a monopoly on their commodities, such as cloves, nutmeg, mace, cinnamon, ginger, silk, pearls and the export of gold and silver bullion from Portugal to Asia.

Portugal was the first European nation to establish trade routes with Japan. A significant portion of the crew on Portuguese ships were Indian Christians.

The Portuguese Crown instituted a number of official carreiras, literally meaning "runs", connecting Goa to major Portuguese and non-Portuguese harbours around the Indian and Pacific oceans once a year. Initially conducted through Crown vessels, after 1560, the Crown began leasing them to private contractors, and by the late 16th century they were the norm. By 1580, the value of inter-Asian trade rights leases reached as high as two million cruzados - twice the value the Portuguese Crown earned from the Goa-Lisbon trade.

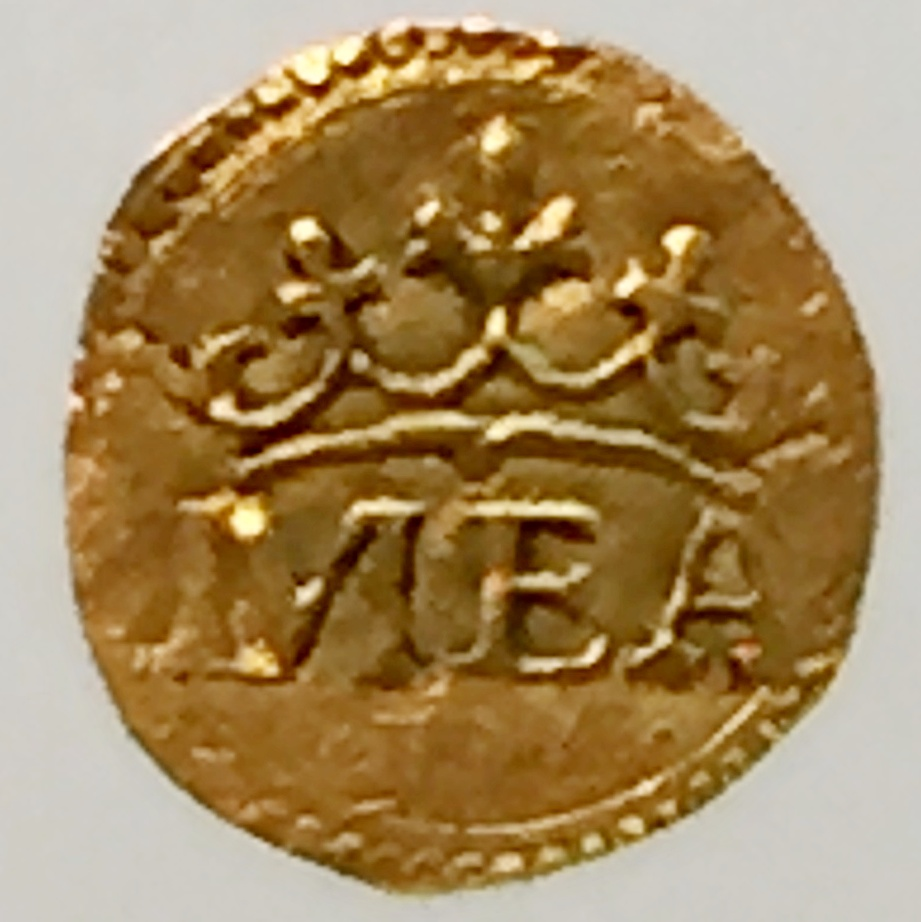
Portuguese gold coin struck in Goa during the reign of King Manuel I, 1510–1521

Portugal regulated and rerouted the Indian Ocean trade by imposing a system of safe-passes called cartaz. It was imposed most effectively on the west coast of India. The Portuguese Crown also collected high customs dues, most importantly at Goa, Hormuz, Malacca, Bassein and Diu, and in the 1580s it accounted for over 85% of the viceroys revenue.

Independent Portuguese merchants got involved in the inter-Asian trade, and the backbone of informal Portuguese presence and trade in Asia was formed of Eurasian merchants, descending from Portuguese soldiers or merchants married to local wives. Their main hub of activities was the capital of Goa, where the largest community of casados ("married men") was located at, about 2,000 families. The core element of their trade was Gujarati cotton textiles, but they also dealt in Kerala pepper, cinnamon from Sri Lanka, Kanara rice, diamonds from southern India and larins from Persia. By 1520 they had penetrated almost every commercially relevant region in Asia aside from Japan (which was reached in the 1540s). Macau was founded by independent Portuguese traders. The Crown regulated their trade into a number of convoys for safety against pirates, the most important of which were those which transported textiles from Gujarat to Goa and rice from Kanara to Goa. The second most important settlement of Portuguese merchants in India was Cochin, where 500 casados with their families resided. Diu had a casado population of about 200.

Portuguese India Company was established in 1628, however with the Crown being its only major shareholder, it was liquidated five years later. By that point, Portugal's share of pepper trade had fallen behind those of the Dutch VOC and the English EIC.

Portuguese trade was greatly reduced by the war with the Dutch VOC, with whom a peace treaty was signed in 1663. Inter-Indian Portuguese convoys continued, mainly with Gujarat, Porto Novo and Madras. Indian cottons became the bedrock of exports from Portuguese India, while tobacco grown in Portuguese Brazil became the most important commodity exported across Asia via Portuguese India till the 19th century. New Portuguese East India Companies established in 1669 and 1685 failed, largely due to disagreements between the Crown and the merchants over the nature of the enterprise and lack of confidence from investors. By the 18th century, tobacco, bullion, firearms, consumer goods such as Madeira wine and books represented the most important items traded in Portuguese India, while exports back to Europe included silks, spices, porcelain, precious stones, Indian cottons and high quality lacquered furniture, a good proportion being unloaded at Bahia in Brazil. Indian cottons were especially valuable in Mozambique, where an important community of Indians from Diu or Daman came to reside. Nevertheless, Goa effectively became a commercial satellite of British Bombay. Many Indo-Portuguese merchants became deeply involved and prominent in French Pondicherry, Danish Tranquebar and especially British Madras, Calcutta and Bombay, Portuguese Jews being linked to the diamond trade in Madras.

== Society and culture ==
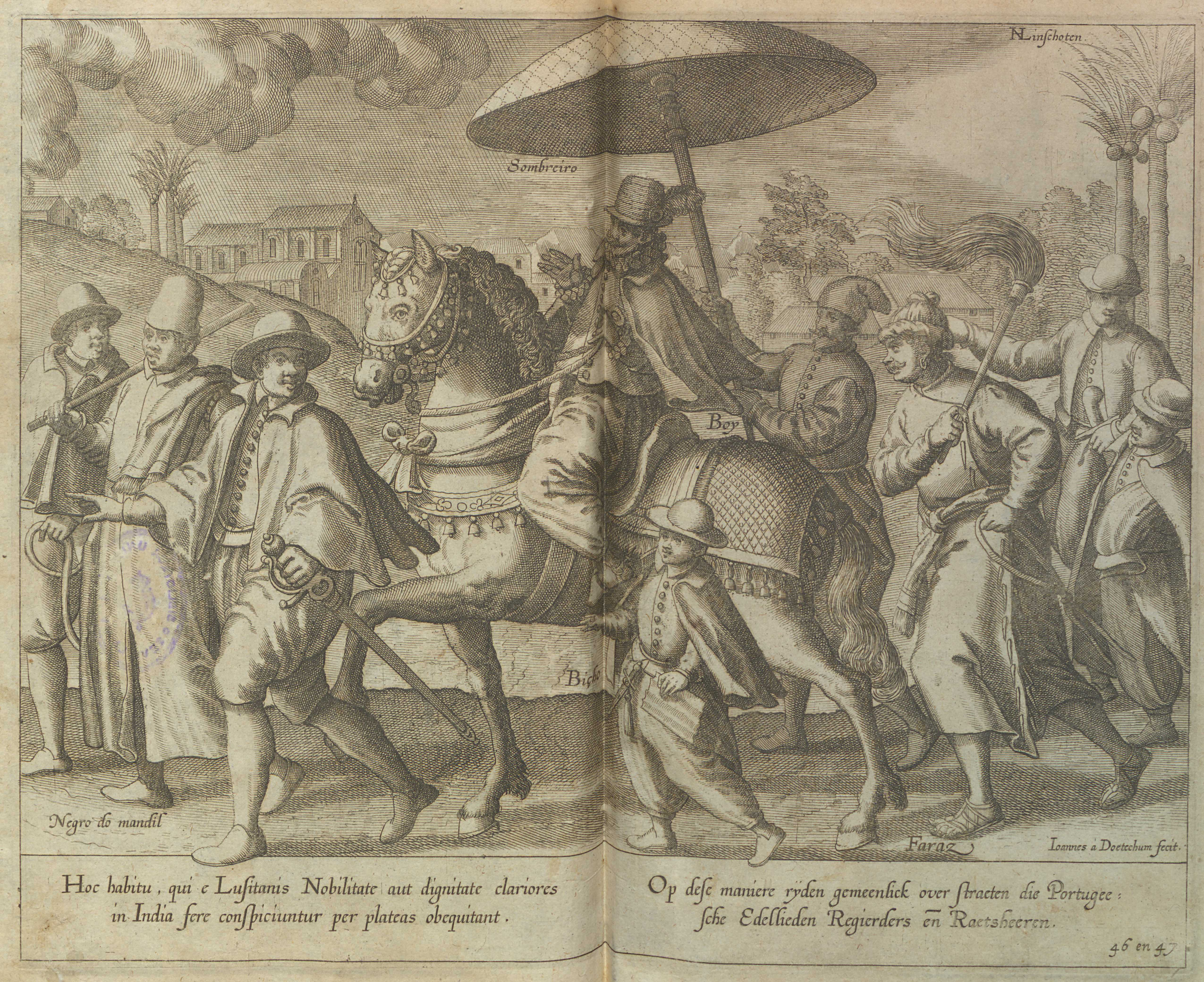
A Portuguese nobleman riding on a horse and surrounded by attendants in India, from Jan Huygen van Linschoten's "Itinerario" (Amsterdam, 1596)

The State was largely urban, since its reason of being was to provide well-protected havens from which trade and communication could be conducted, controlled and dominated, hence only Goa, Daman, Bassein, Chaul and Colombo had any meaningful hinterland and rural populations. After the massacre of the Portuguese in their feitoria in Calicut in 1500, practically every possession of the State was fortified, sometimes massively, and for this reason it resembled as much a network of maritime communications as an enormous perimeter of fortresses.

Portuguese India harboured a society that was officially Christian and European but influenced by the non-European setting into which it was inserted. At the top of the social pyramid were the European-born viceroys, officers, and clergymen, followed by the Portuguese casados and their Eurasian descendants, who could be wealthy merchants or hold important positions in the local câmara, and finally the native society. At their peak in 1600, the total number of Portuguese casados across the State probably numbered about 5,500. Many casados followed a lifestyle that seemed to foreign visitors as remarkably relaxed and luxurious by European standards, some living in fine houses furnished in the Indian fashion with many servants, abundant and varied food that included a wide variety of fruits and poultry, consumed off Ming porcelain. Goan casados often dressed in shirts and white trousers while their wives usually wore saris.

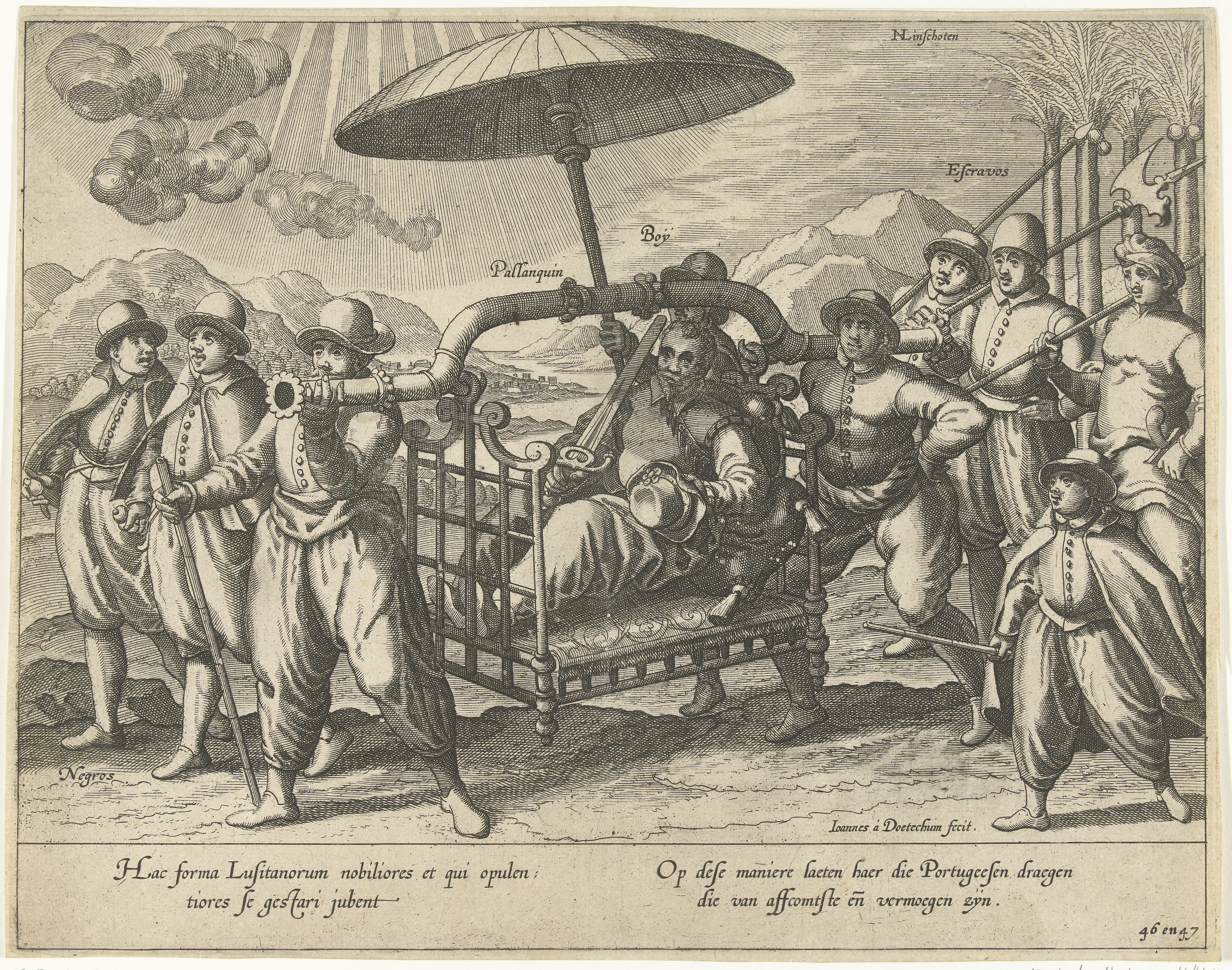
Portuguese riding a palanquin

Alongside fortresses, ecclesiastical buildings dominated the skyline of most Portuguese settlements, particularly in Goa, giving the city a distinctly European and Catholic flavour and a high profile to the Church. About 600 clergymen were concentrated in Goa out of perhaps 1800 east of the Cape of Good Hope in 1630. Nevertheless, the European and Christian Eurasian community in any Portuguese settlement of the State always constituted a minority, perhaps no more than 7% in the case of Goa, the rest being Hindus, Indian Christians, other Asians and Africans, free or slaves.

For these reasons, the State was culturally hybrid, distant as it was from Europe, with the façades and interiors of churches blending Portuguese and Asian iconographic traditions, while the domestic culture was likewise a compromise between East and West, with furniture, dress and food often more Asian than Portuguese.

== Postal history ==
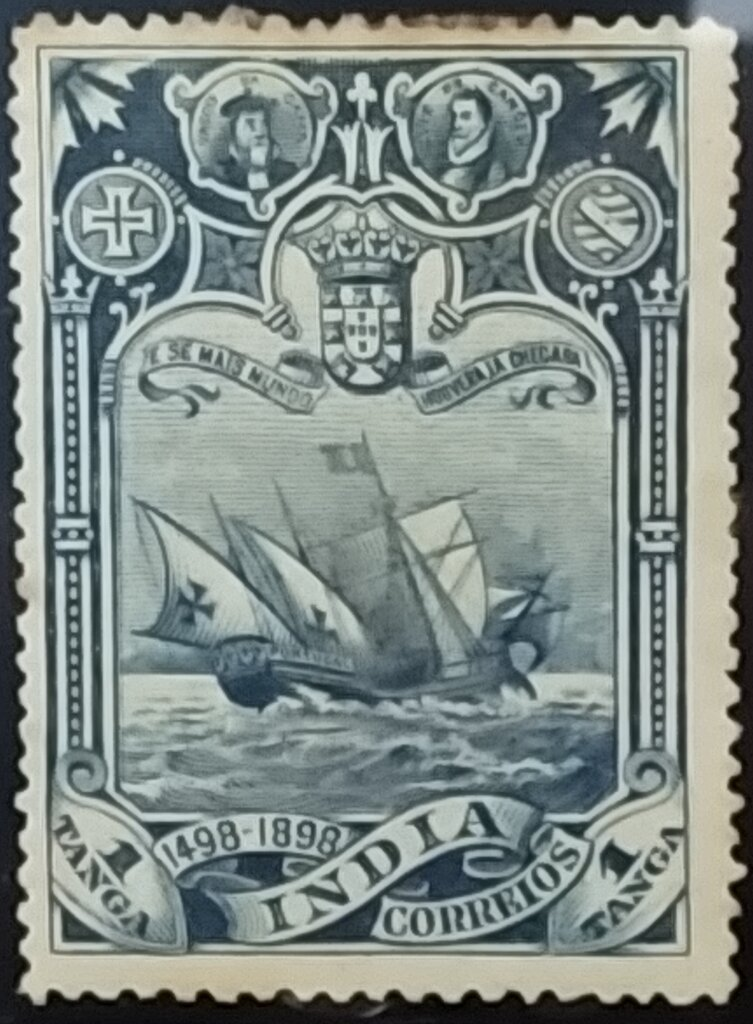
1898 Portuguese India 1 tanga stamp, depicting the flagship of Vasco da Gama, the São Gabriel

Early postal history of the colony is obscure, but regular mail is known to have been exchanged with Lisbon from 1825 onwards. Portugal had a postal convention with Great Britain, so much mail was probably routed through Bombay and carried on British packets. Portuguese postmarks are known from 1854 when a post office was opened in Goa.

The last regular issue for Portuguese India was on 25 June 1960, for the 500th anniversary of the death of Prince Henry the Navigator. Stamps of India were first used on 29 December 1961, although the old stamps were accepted until 5 January 1962. Portugal continued to issue stamps for the lost colony but none were offered for sale in the colony's post offices, so they are not considered valid stamps.

Dual franking was tolerated from 22 December 1961 until 4 January 1962. Colonial (Portuguese) postmarks were tolerated until May 1962.

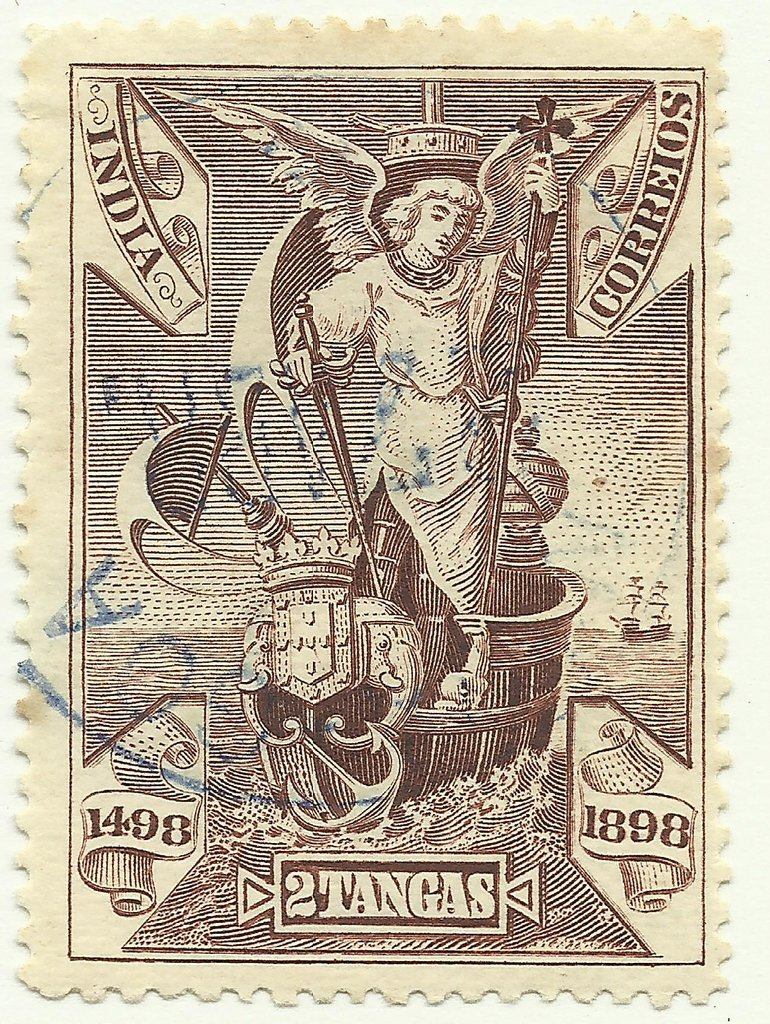

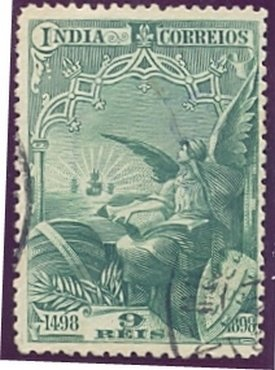

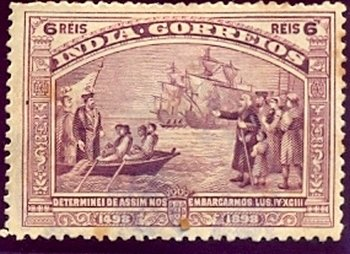

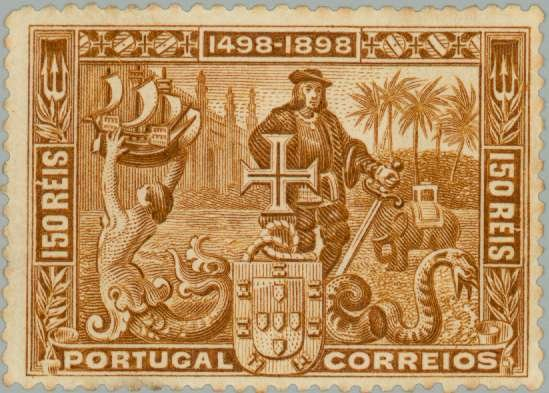

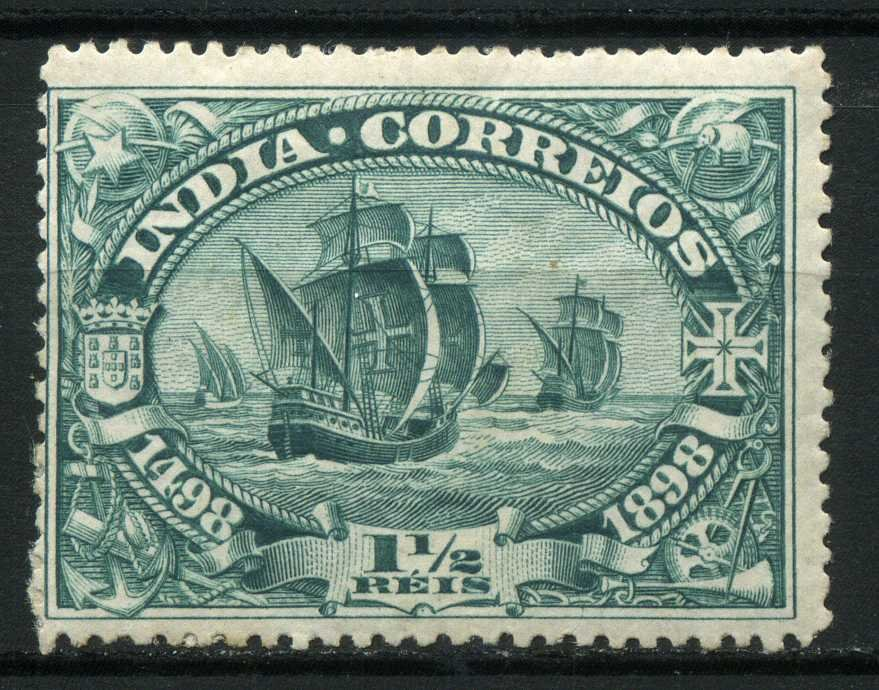

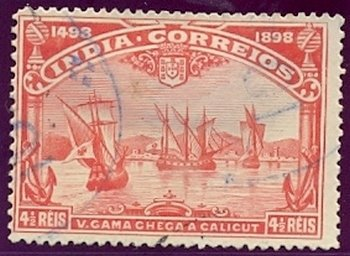

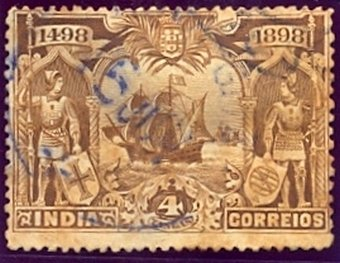

== Gallery ==
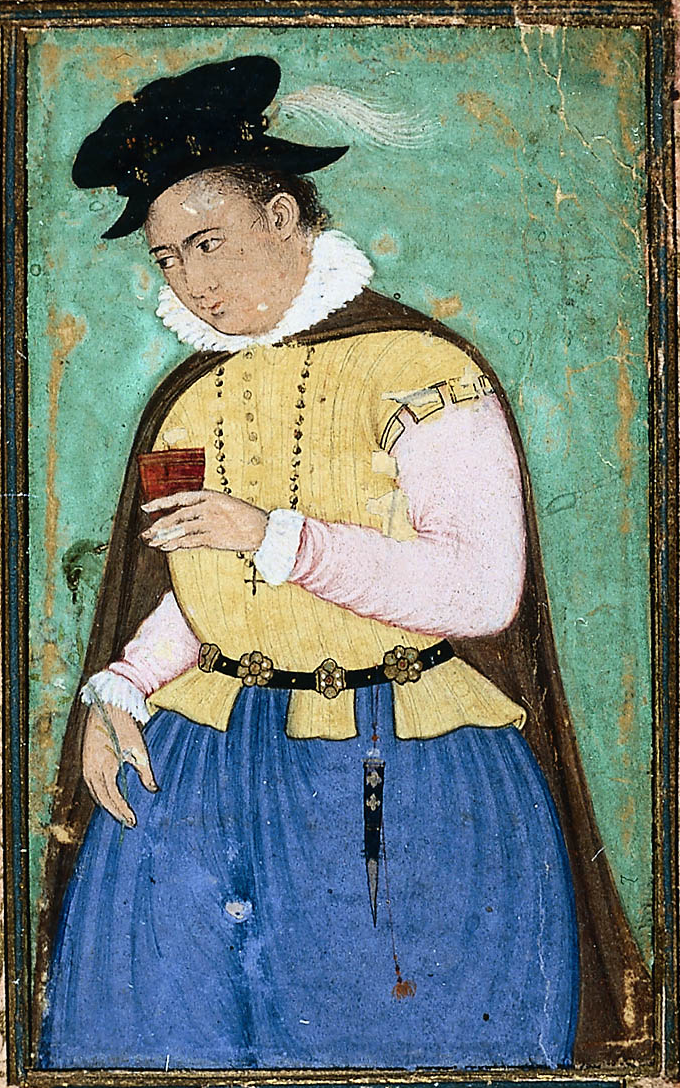
Depiction of a Portuguese gentleman in the Moghul Empire

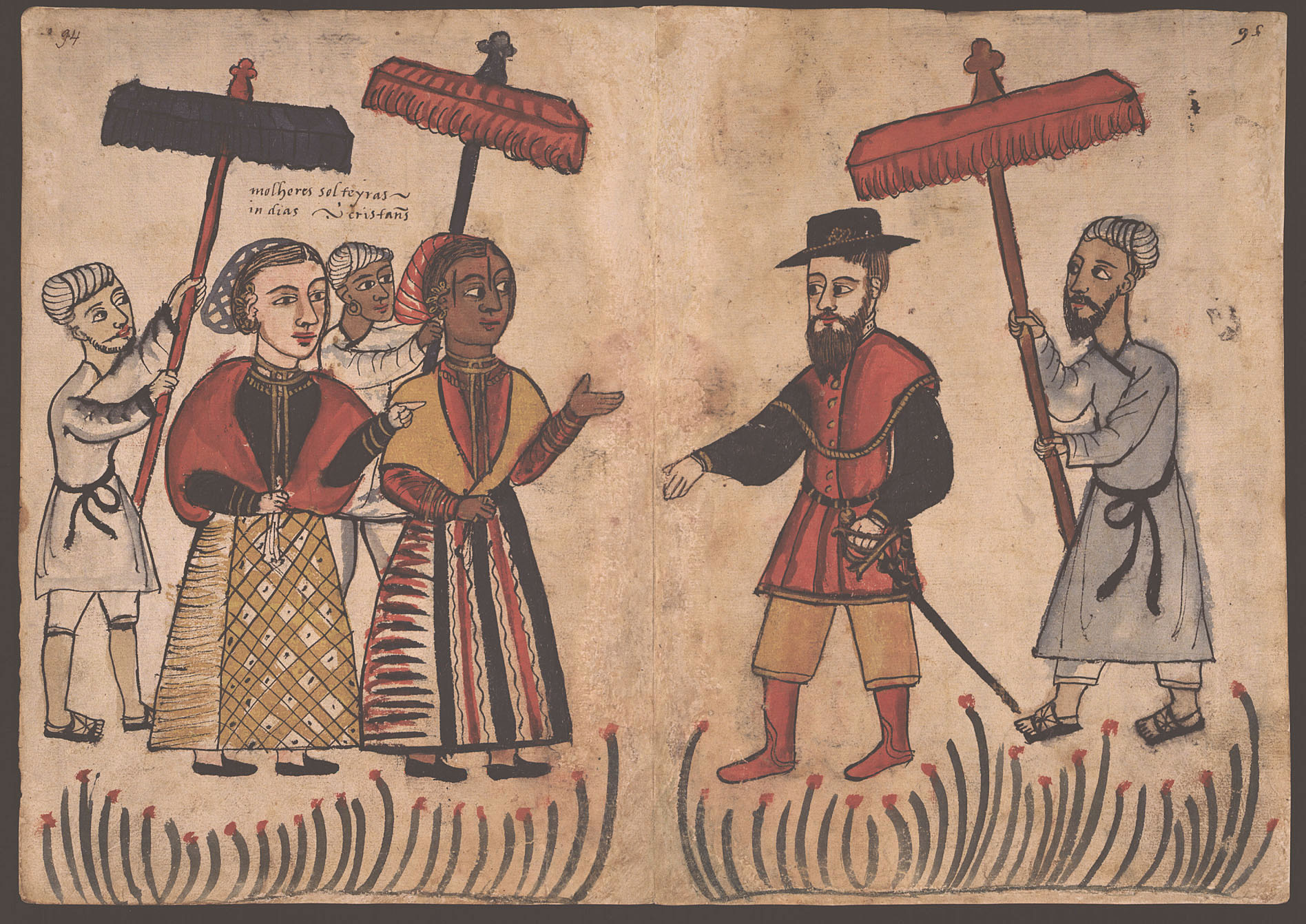
Indo-Portuguese illustration of a Portuguese nobleman and Christian Indian women, from the Códice Casanatense.

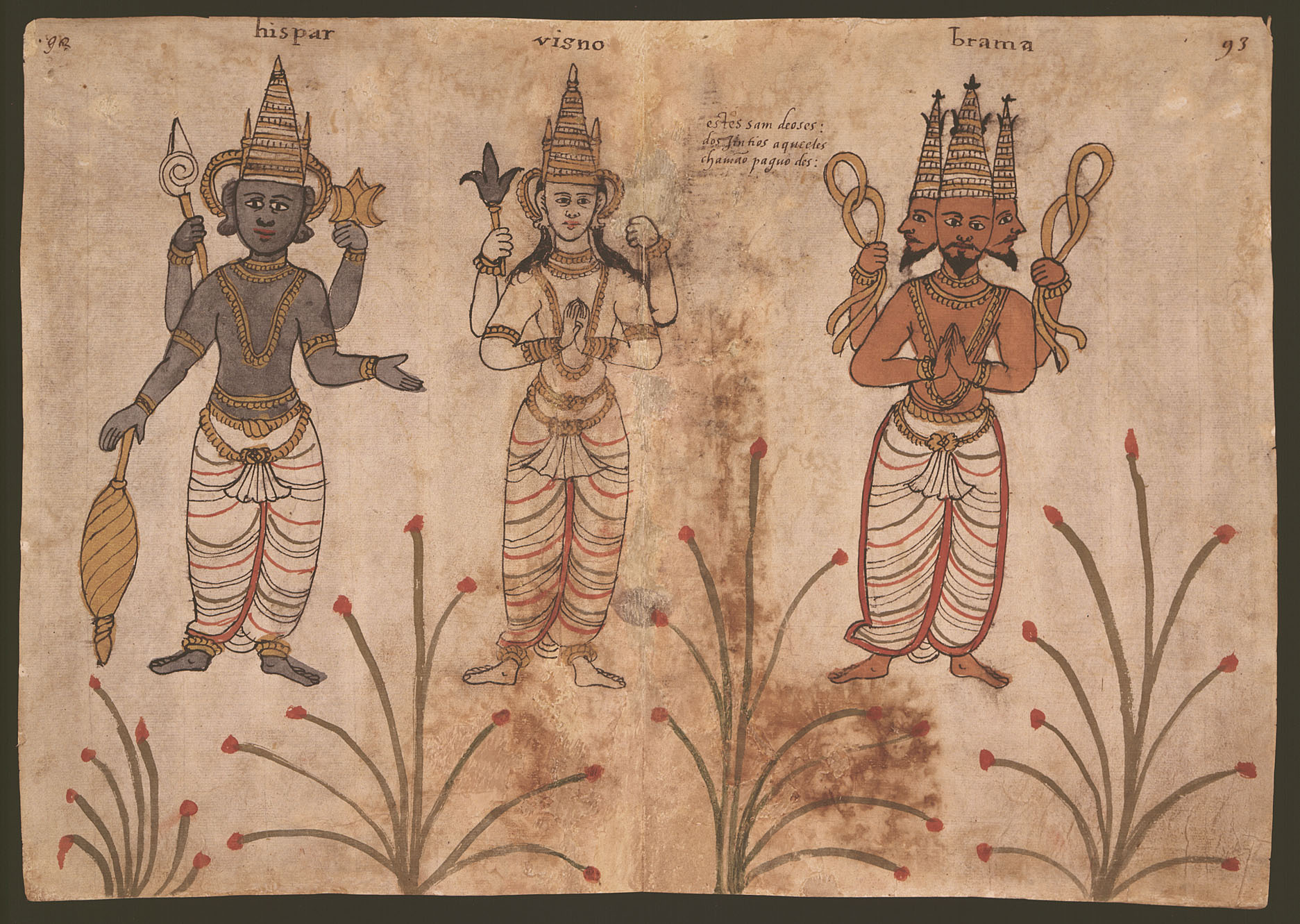
16th century Indo-Portuguese illustration of the main deities of Hinduism at the Códice Casanatense.

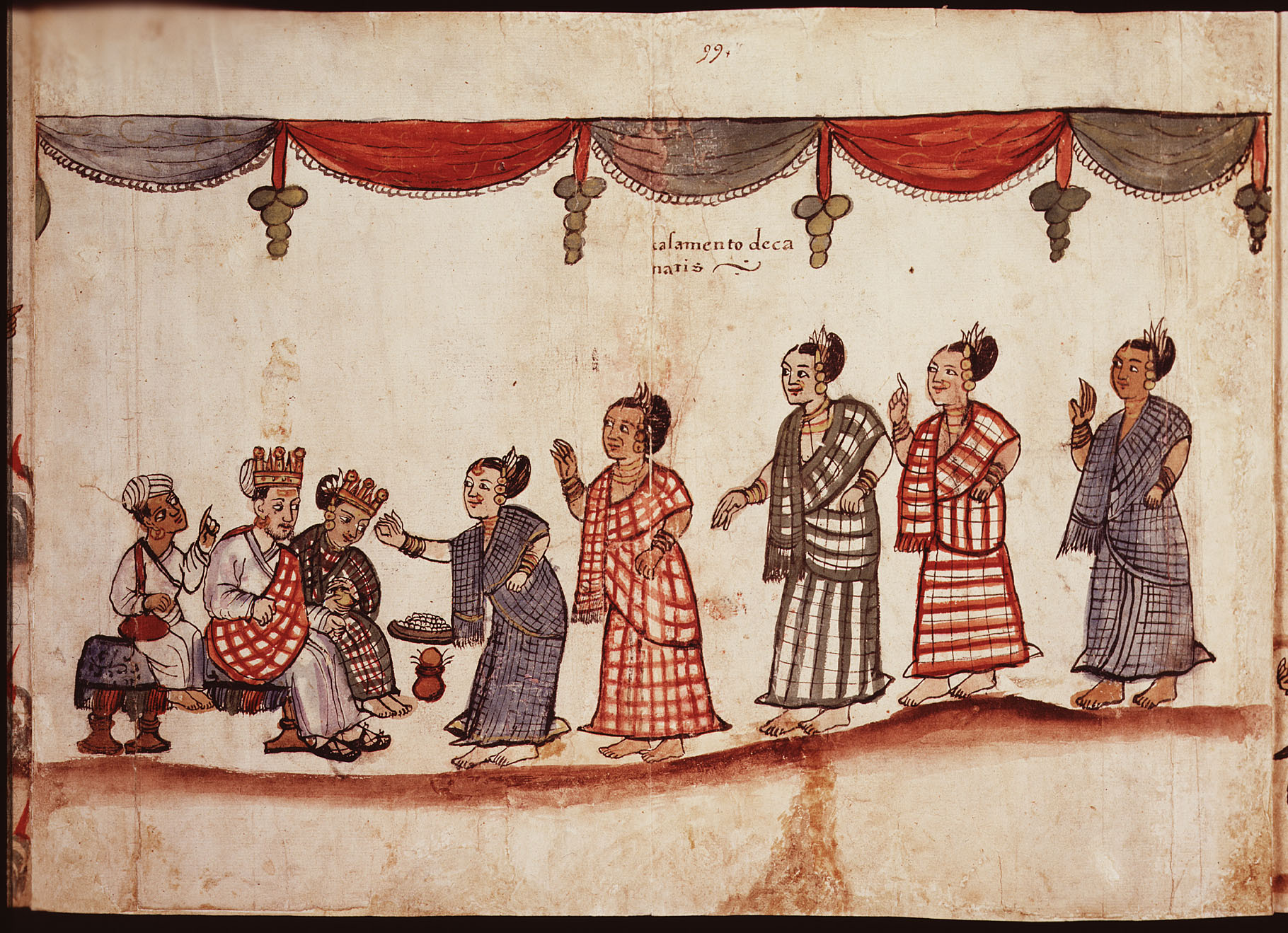
16th century Indo-Portuguese illustration of a Hindu marriage at the Códice Casanatense.

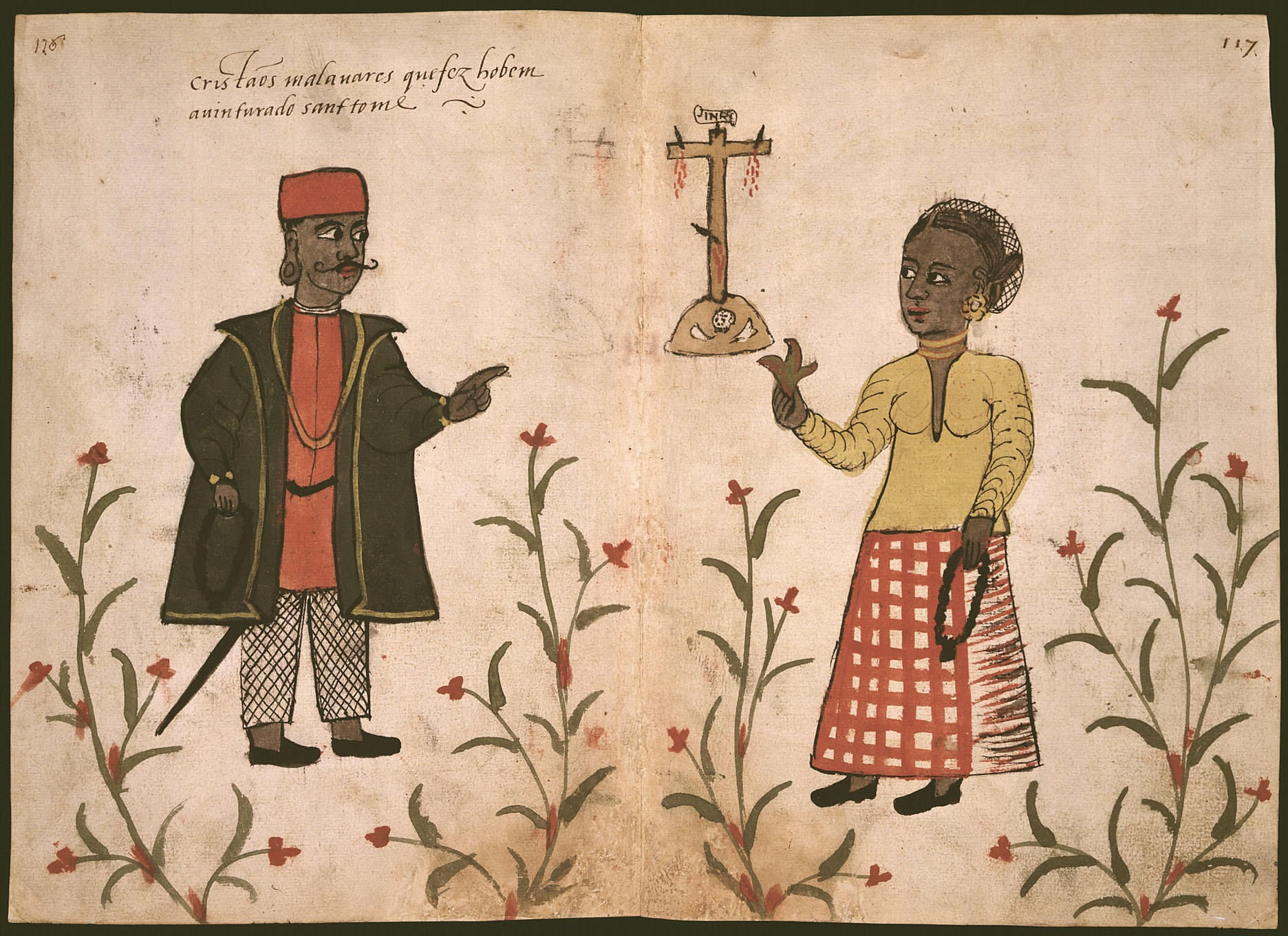
16th century Indo-Portuguese illustration of Saint Thomas Christians at the Códice Casanatense.

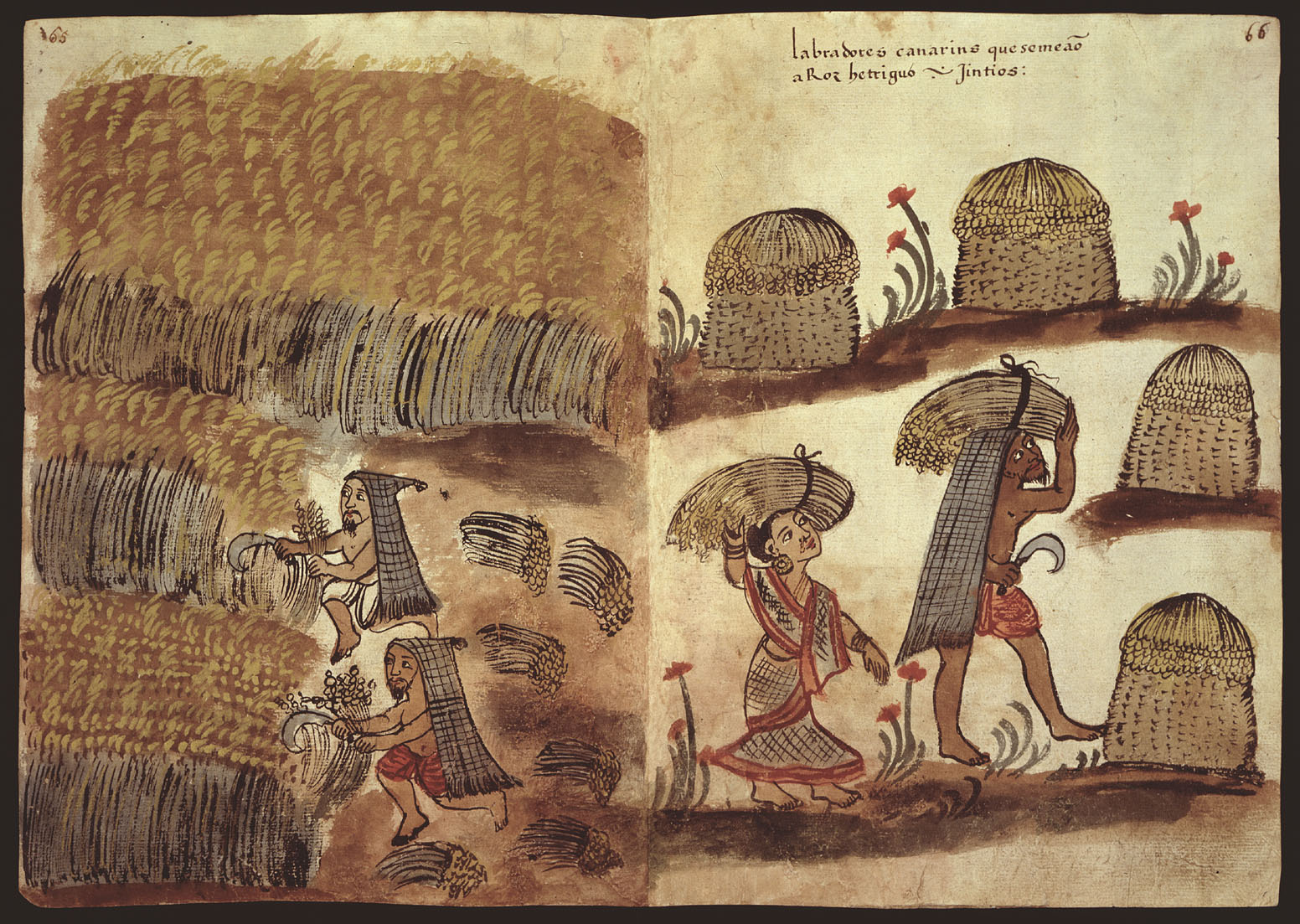
16th century Indo-Portuguese illustration of Kanarese peasants at the Códice Casanatense.

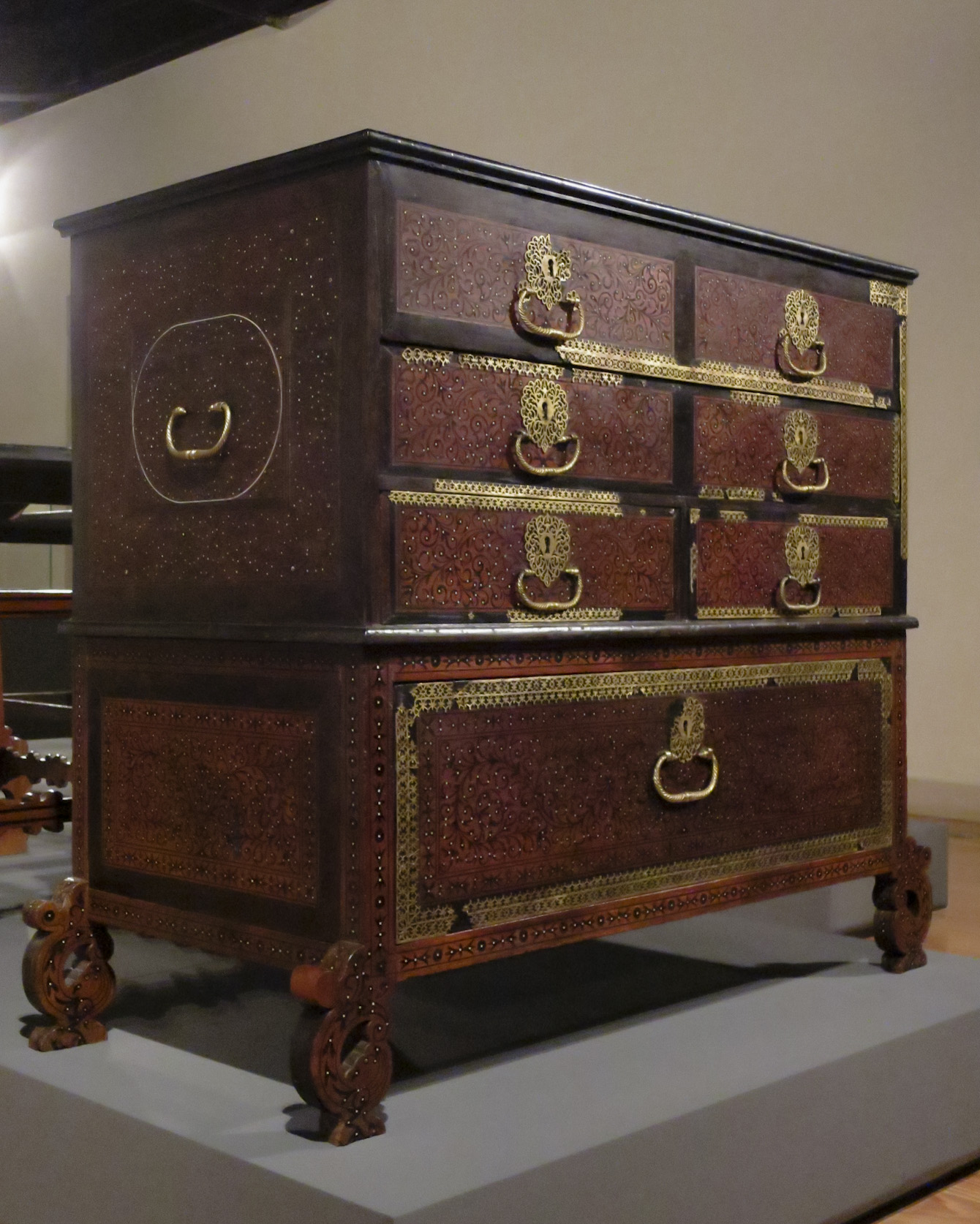
18th century Indo-Portuguese cabinet

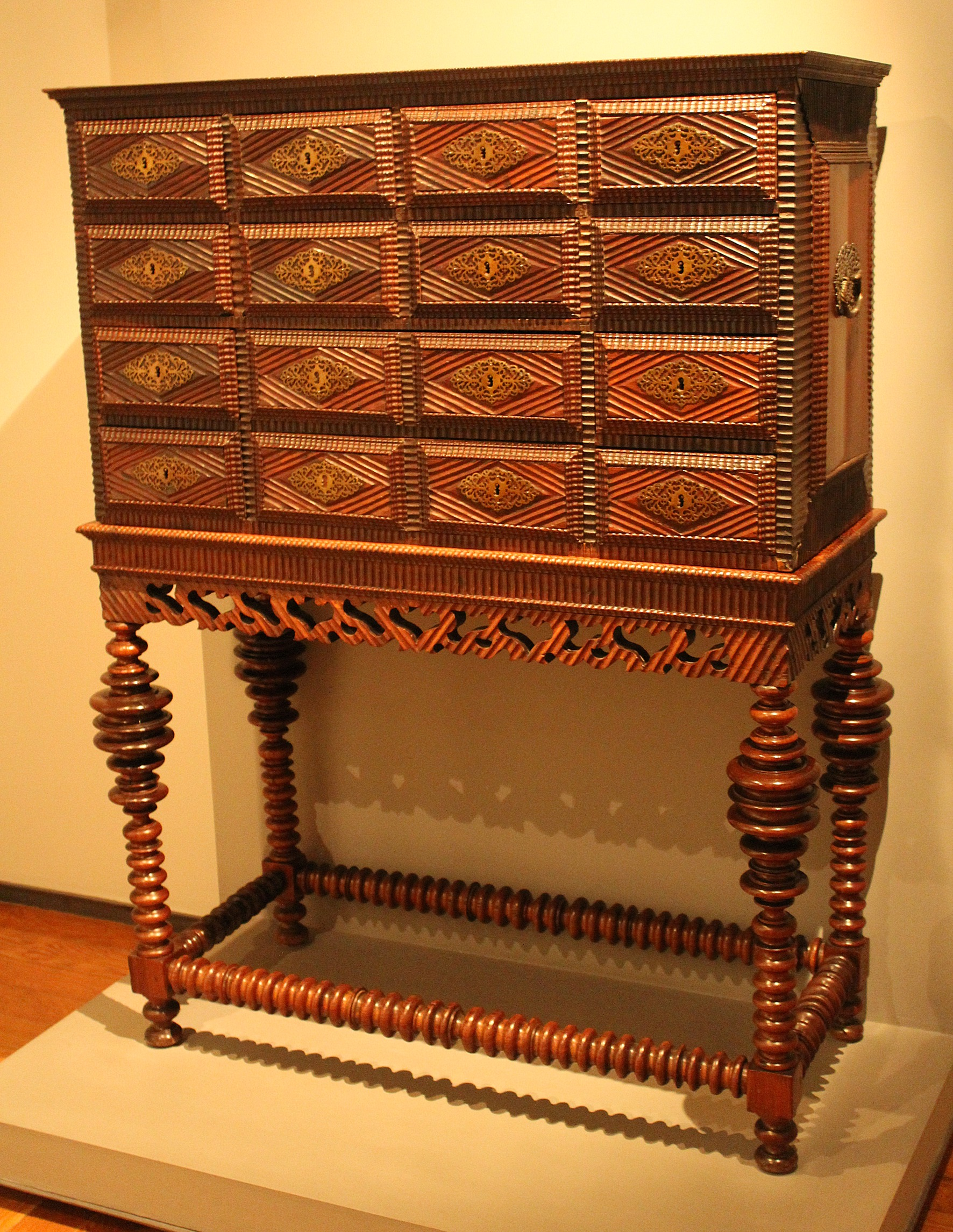
Indo-Portuguese cabinet

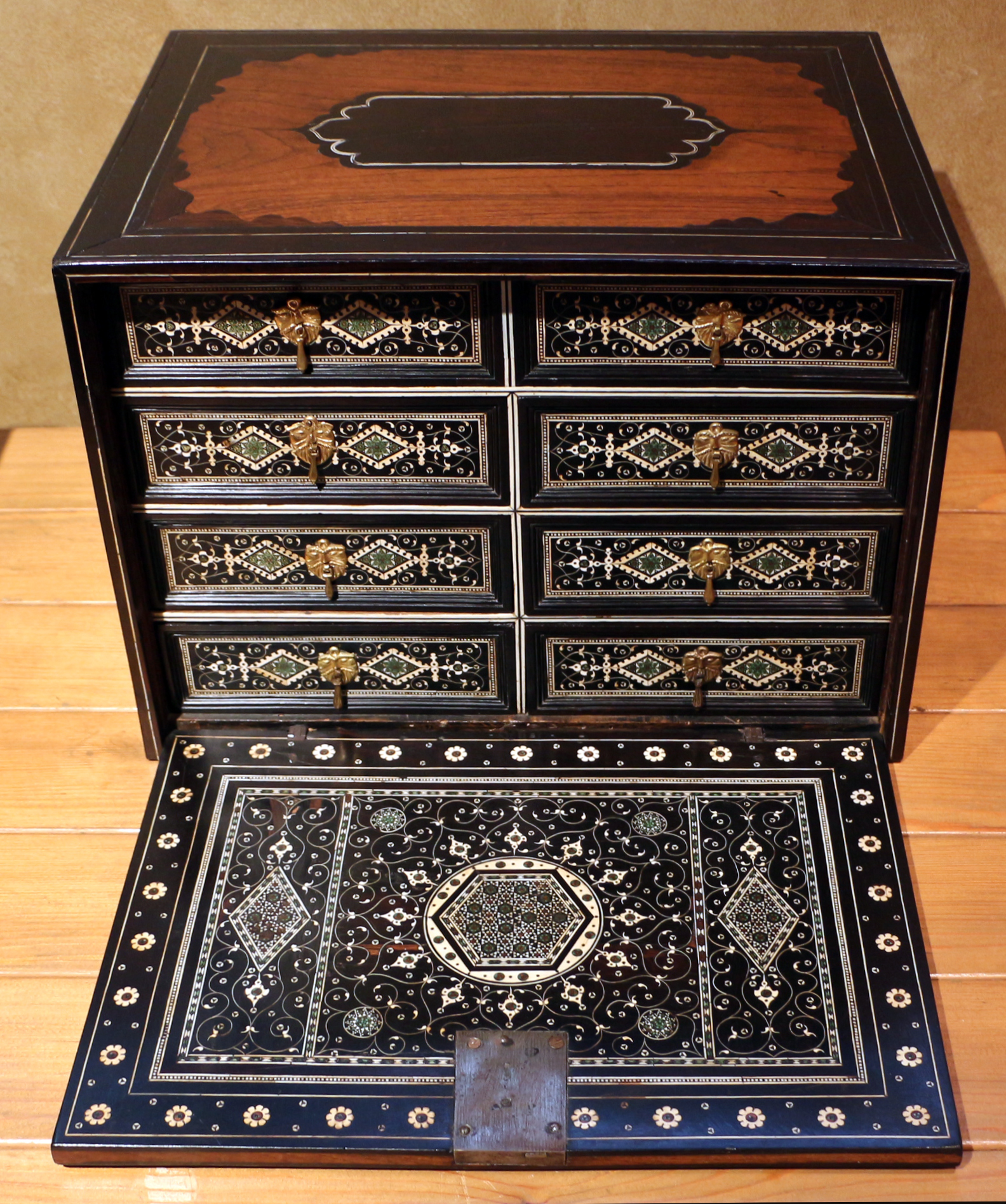
Indo-Portuguese writing cabinet

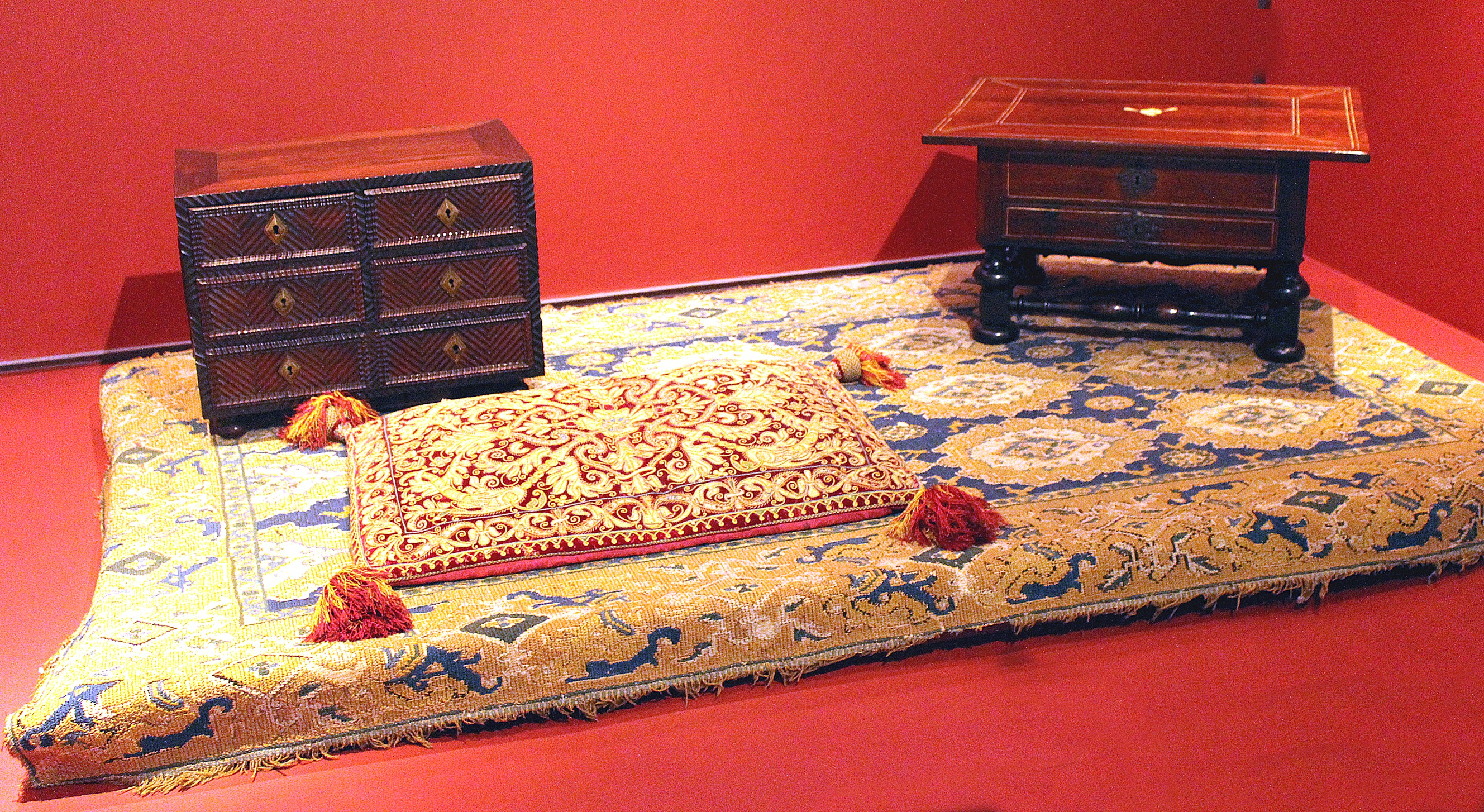
Indo-Portuguese furniture

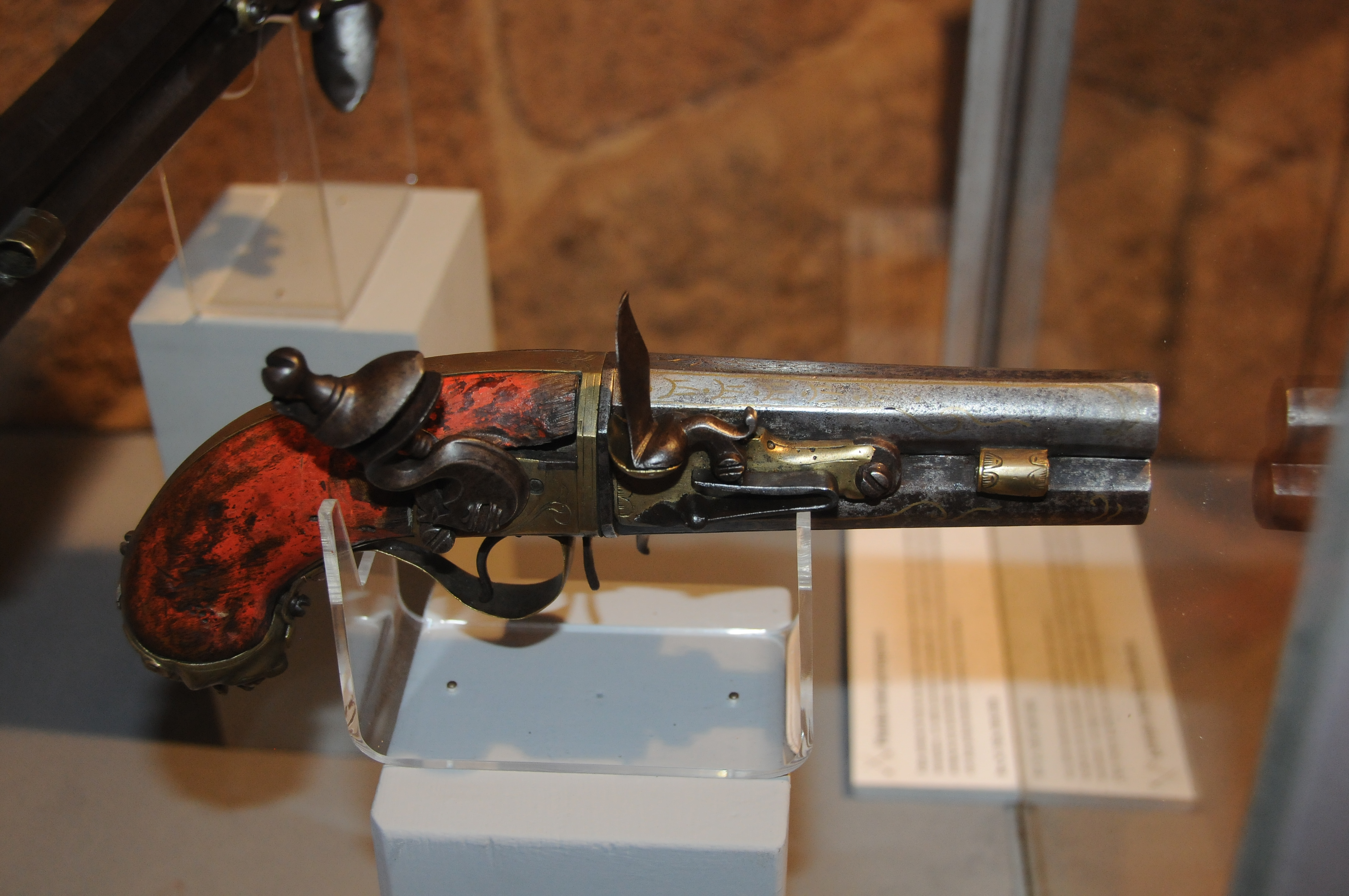
Indo-Portuguese pistol

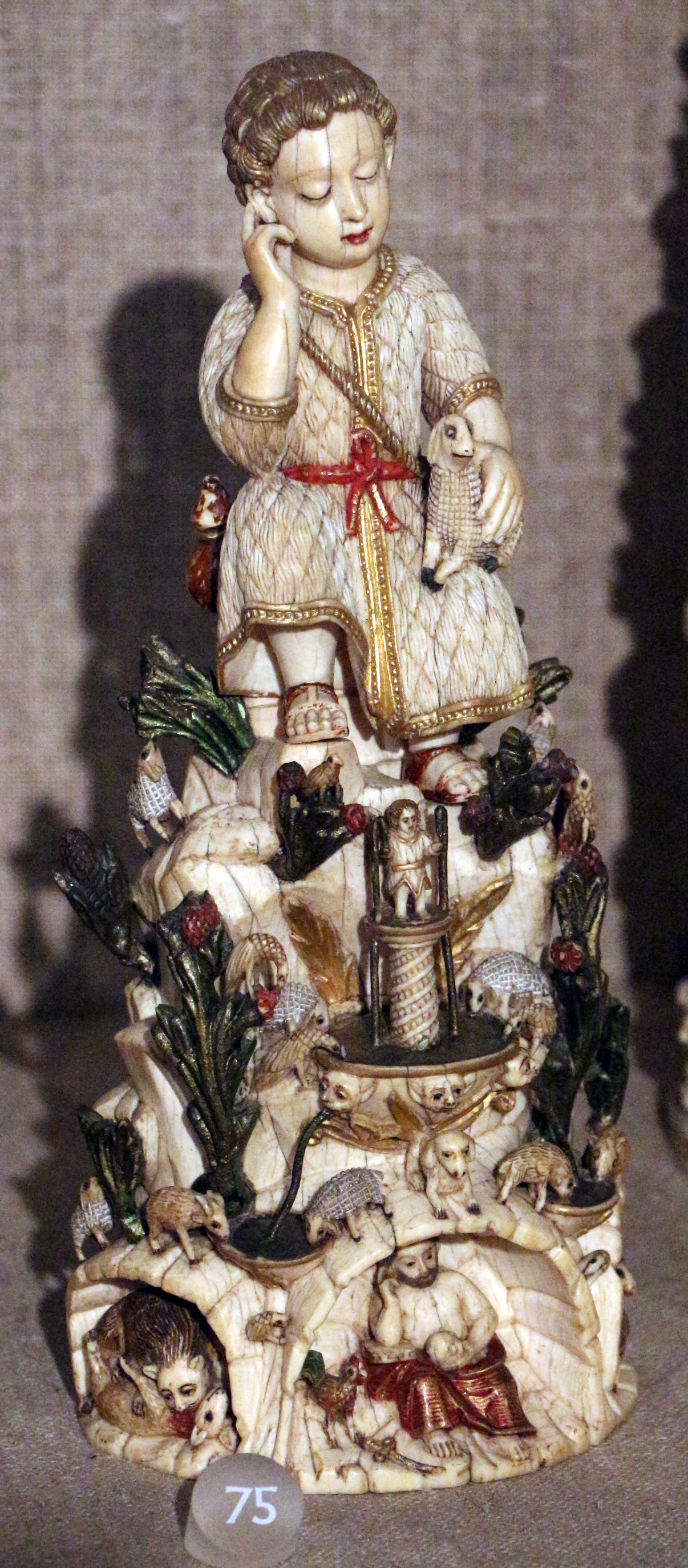
17th century Indo-Portuguese Christian ivory.

=== Currency ===
½ Tanga (1903)
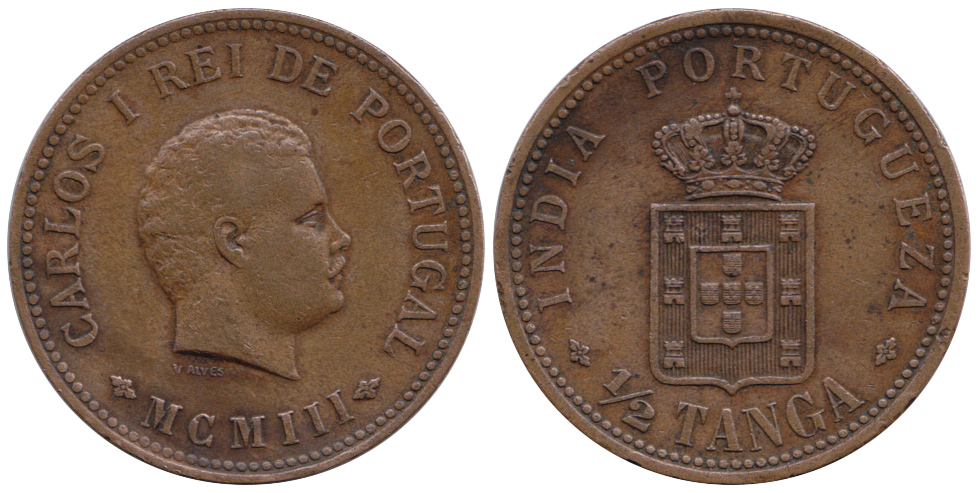
First side of the image: Obverse: Lettering "CARLOS I REI DE PORTUGAL MCMIII", portrait of King Carlos I.
Second side of the image: Reverse: Lettering "INDIA PORTUGUEZA ½ TANGA", coat of arms of Portuguese India.
800,000 coins minted, bronze. Engraver Valancio Alves.
1 Escudo (1959)
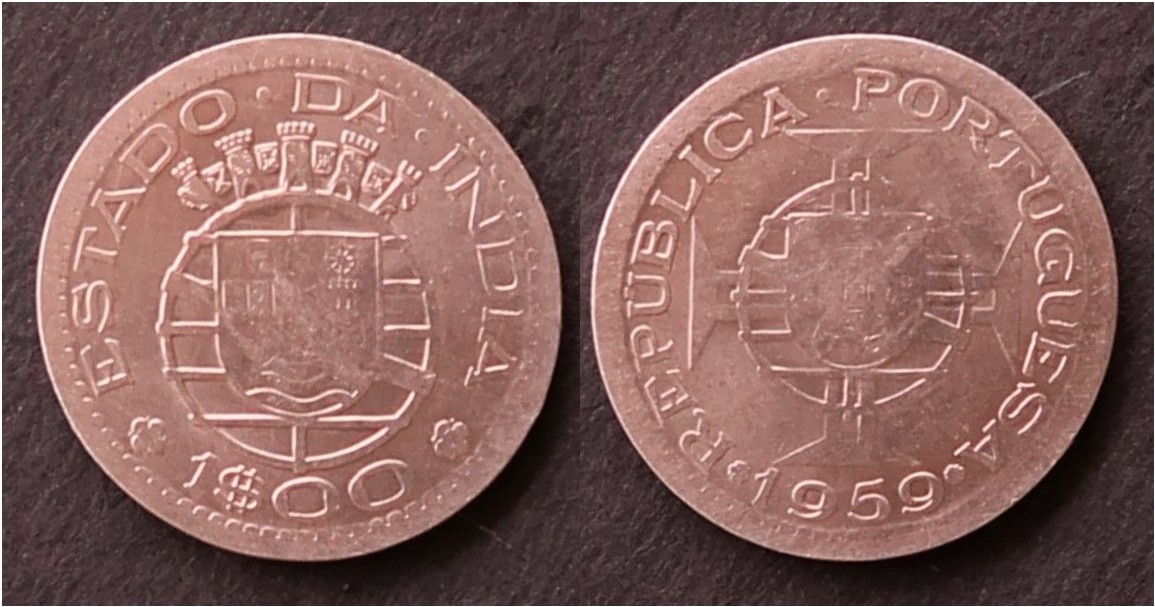
First side of the image: Obverse: Lettering "ESTADO·DA·INDIA", face value with Coat of arms of Portuguese India in the center.
Second side of the image: Reverse: Lettering "REPÚBLICA · PORTUGUESA", year and Coat of arms of Portugal in the center.
6,000,000 coins minted. This coin was from State of India.
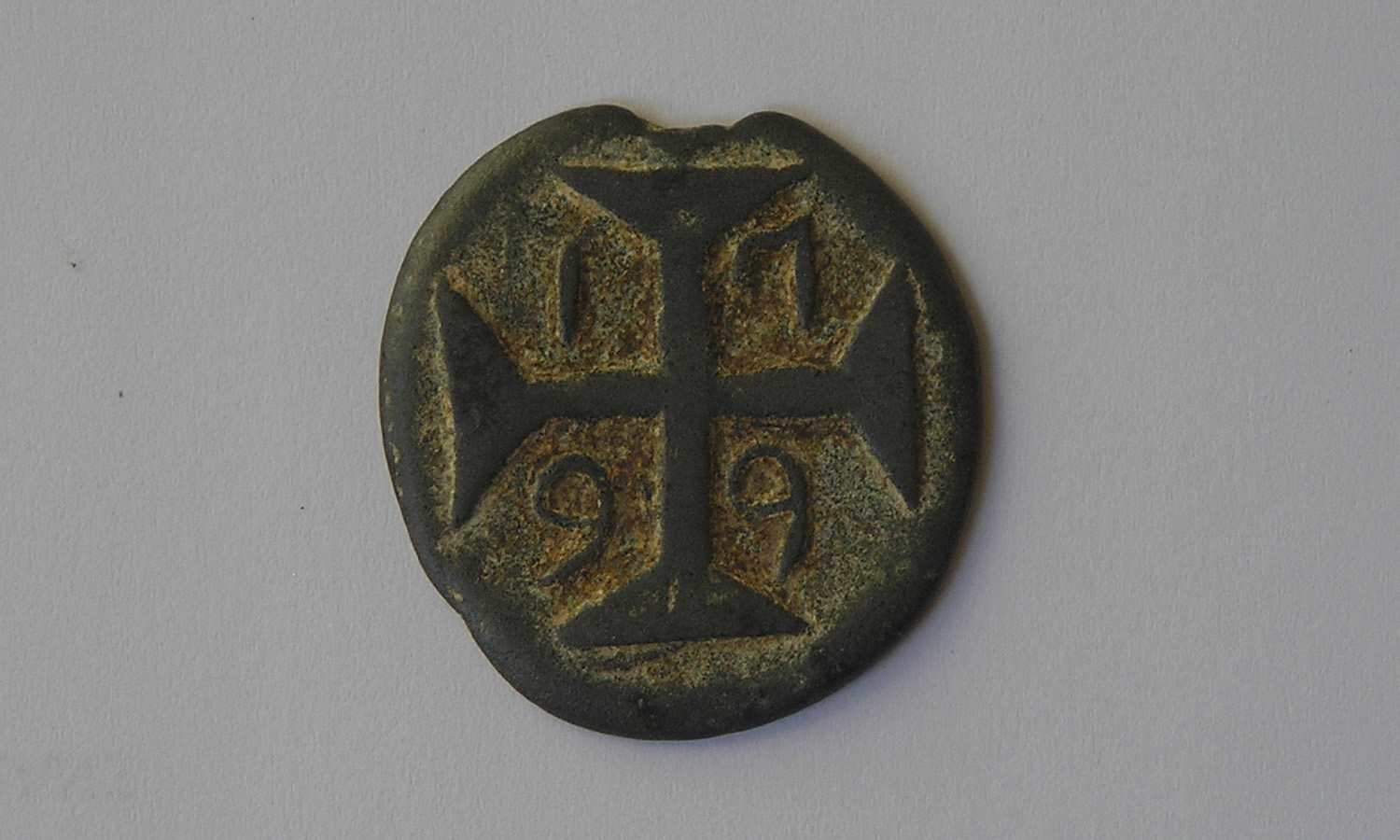
20 Portuguese bazarucos from 1799, reverse.

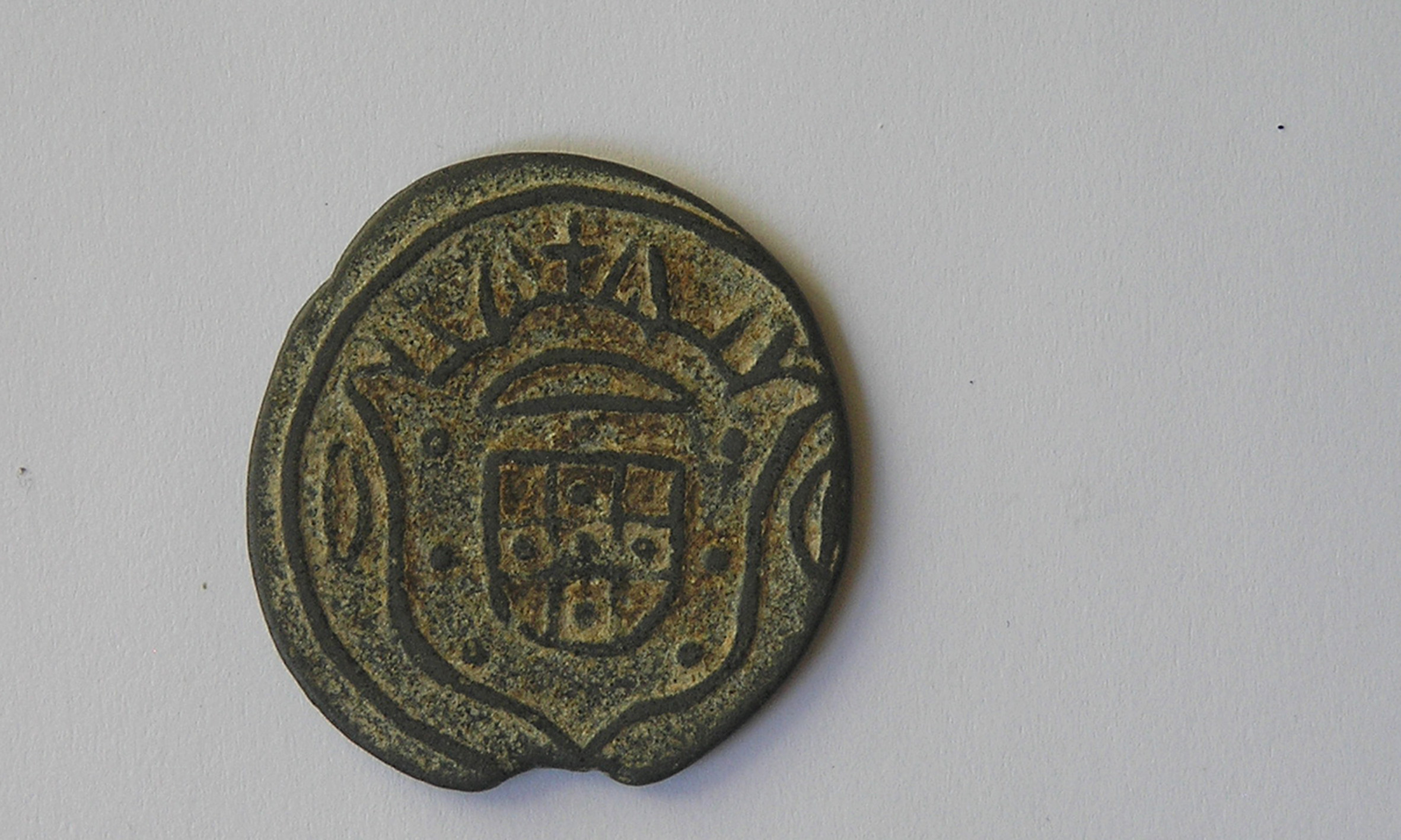
20 Portuguese bazarucos from 1799, obverse.

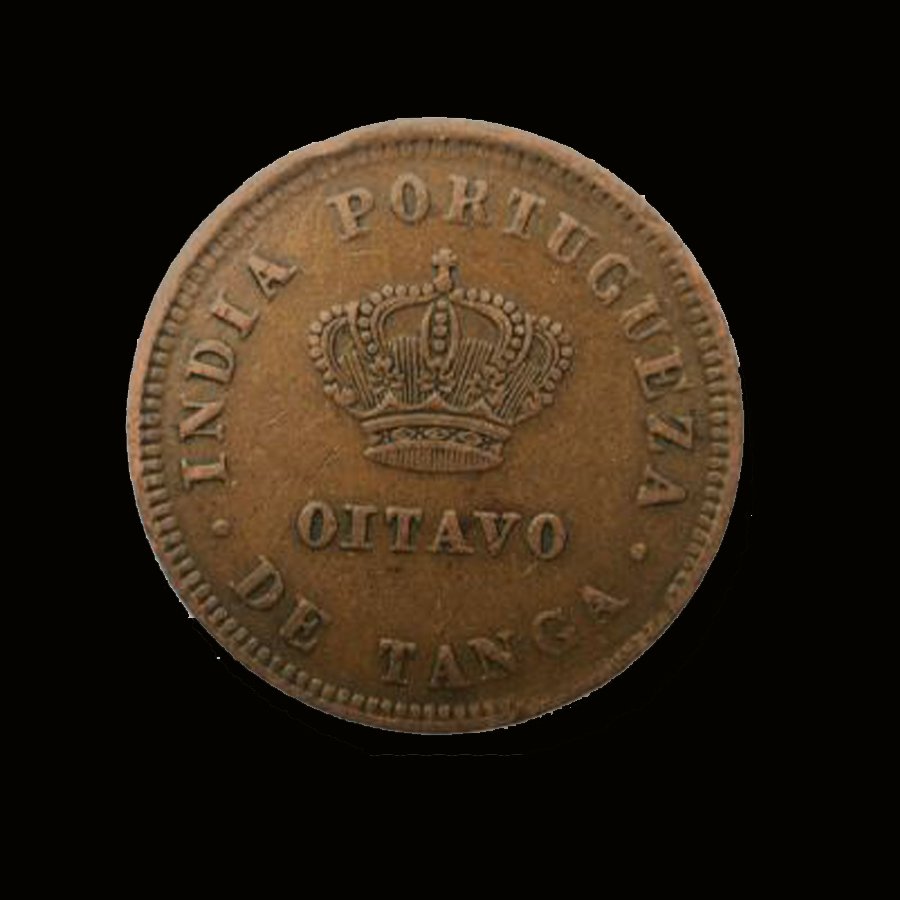
1866 1/8 tanga.

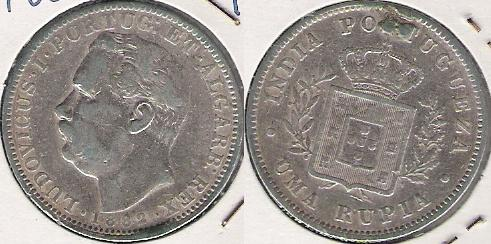
1 Portuguese India rupia, 1882.

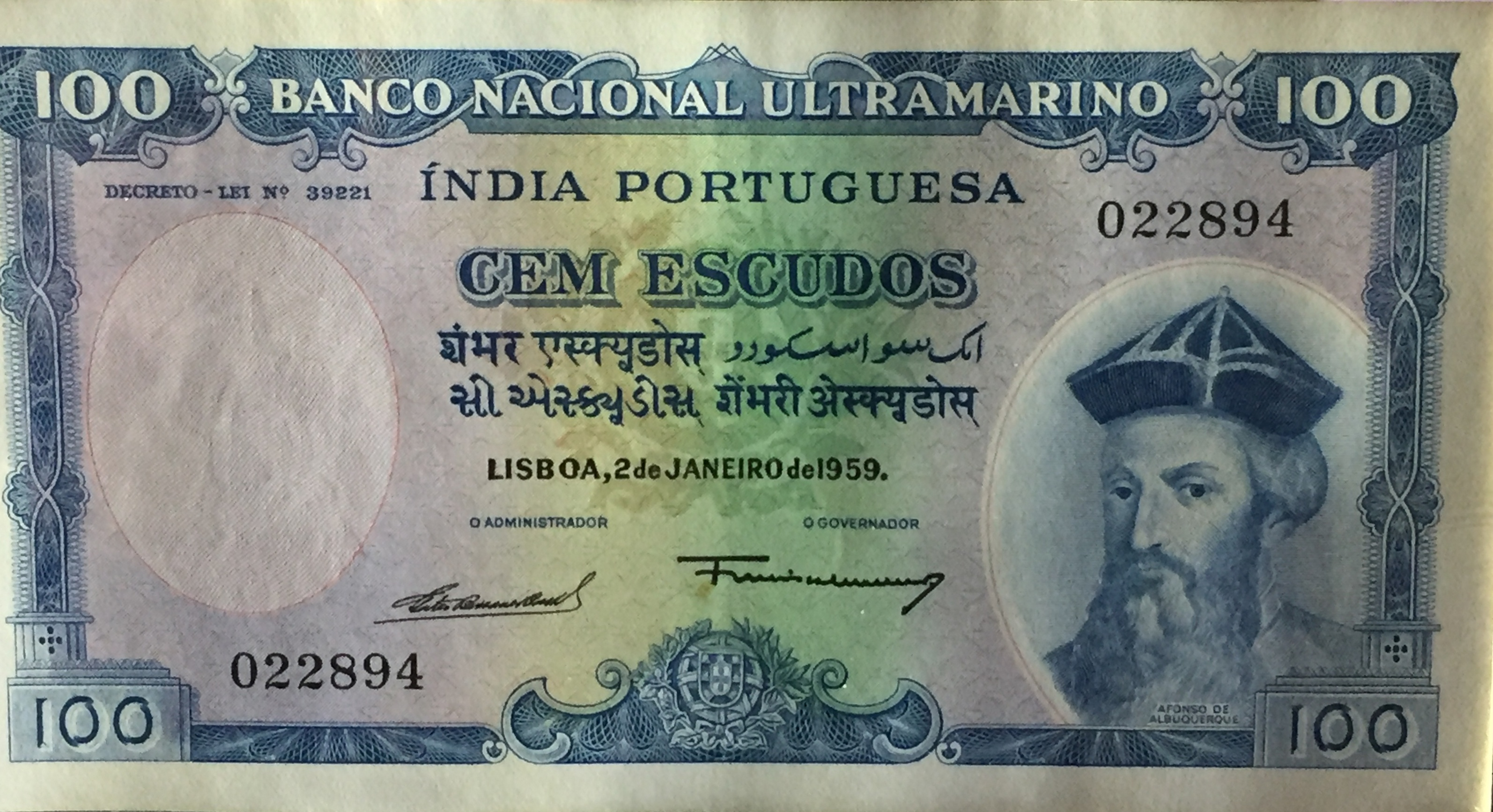
1959 100 escudos.

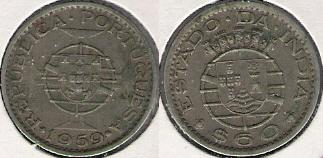
60 Portuguese India centavos, 1959.

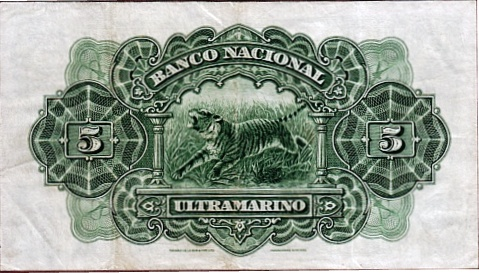
1938 5 rupias banknote reverse.

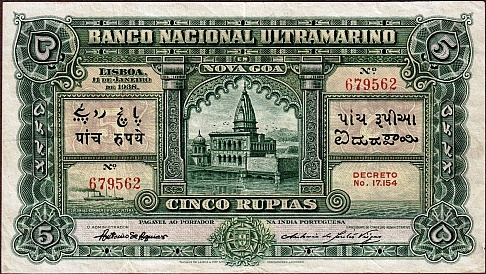
1938 5 rupias banknote obverse.

=== Architecture ===
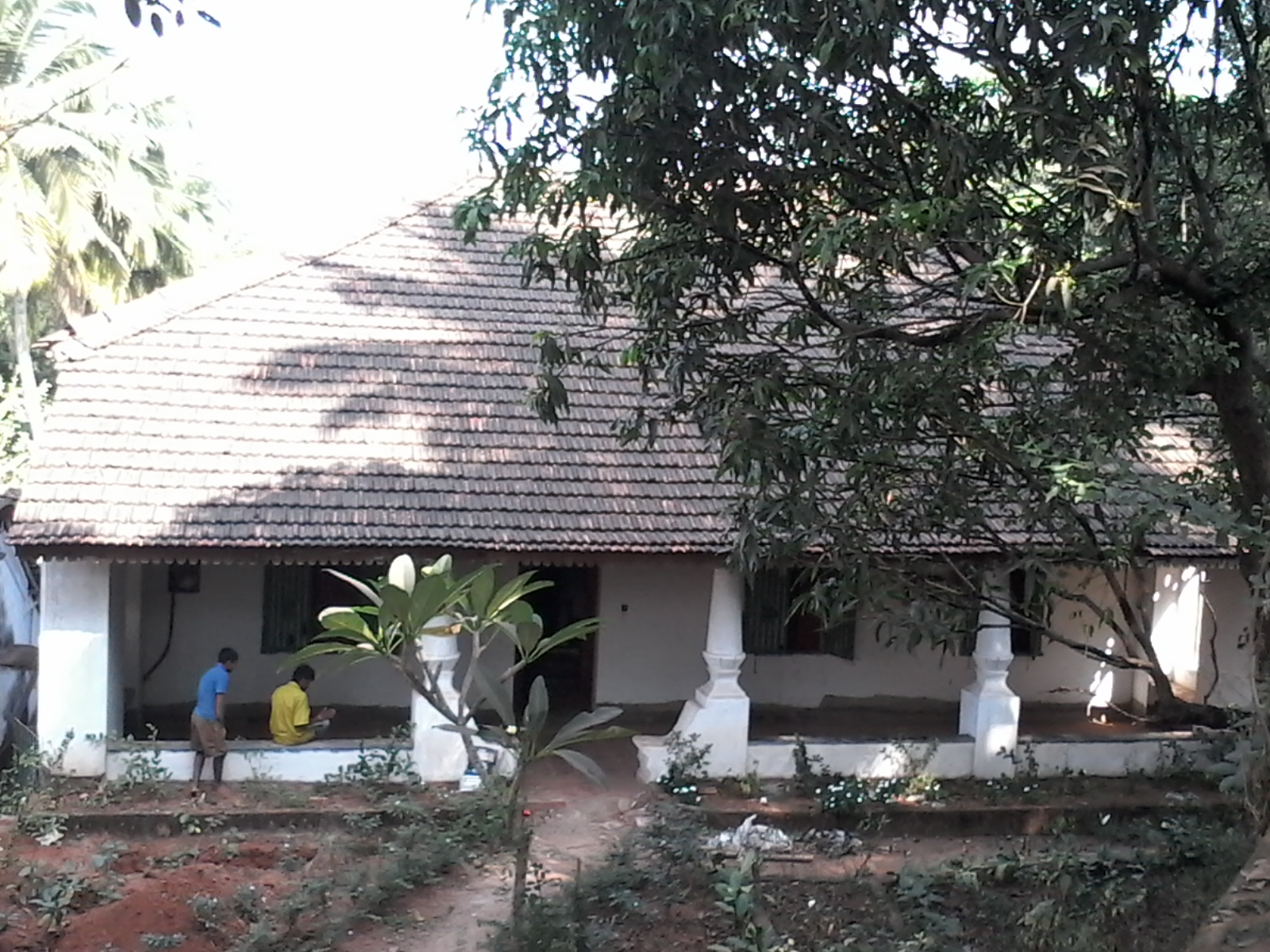
Indo-Portuguese Goan house in Aldona, Goa

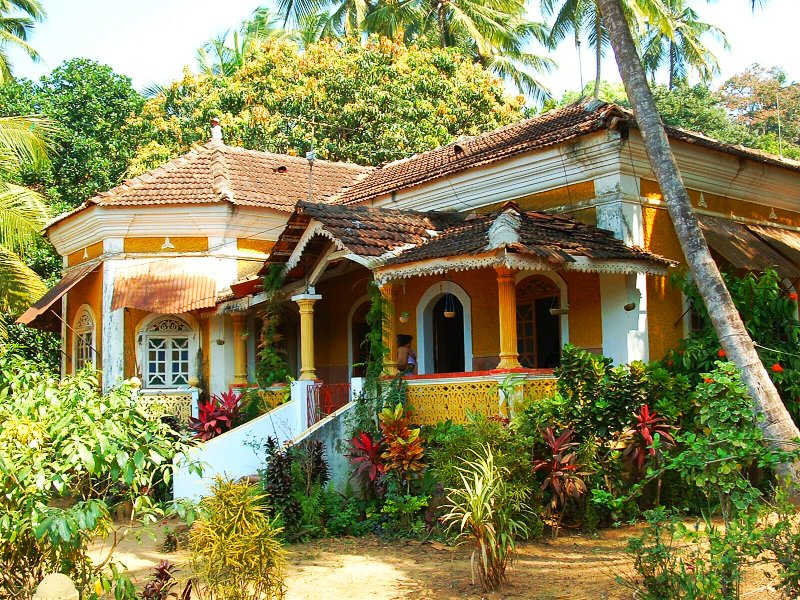
Portuguese-style Goan villa, near Chapora, Goa

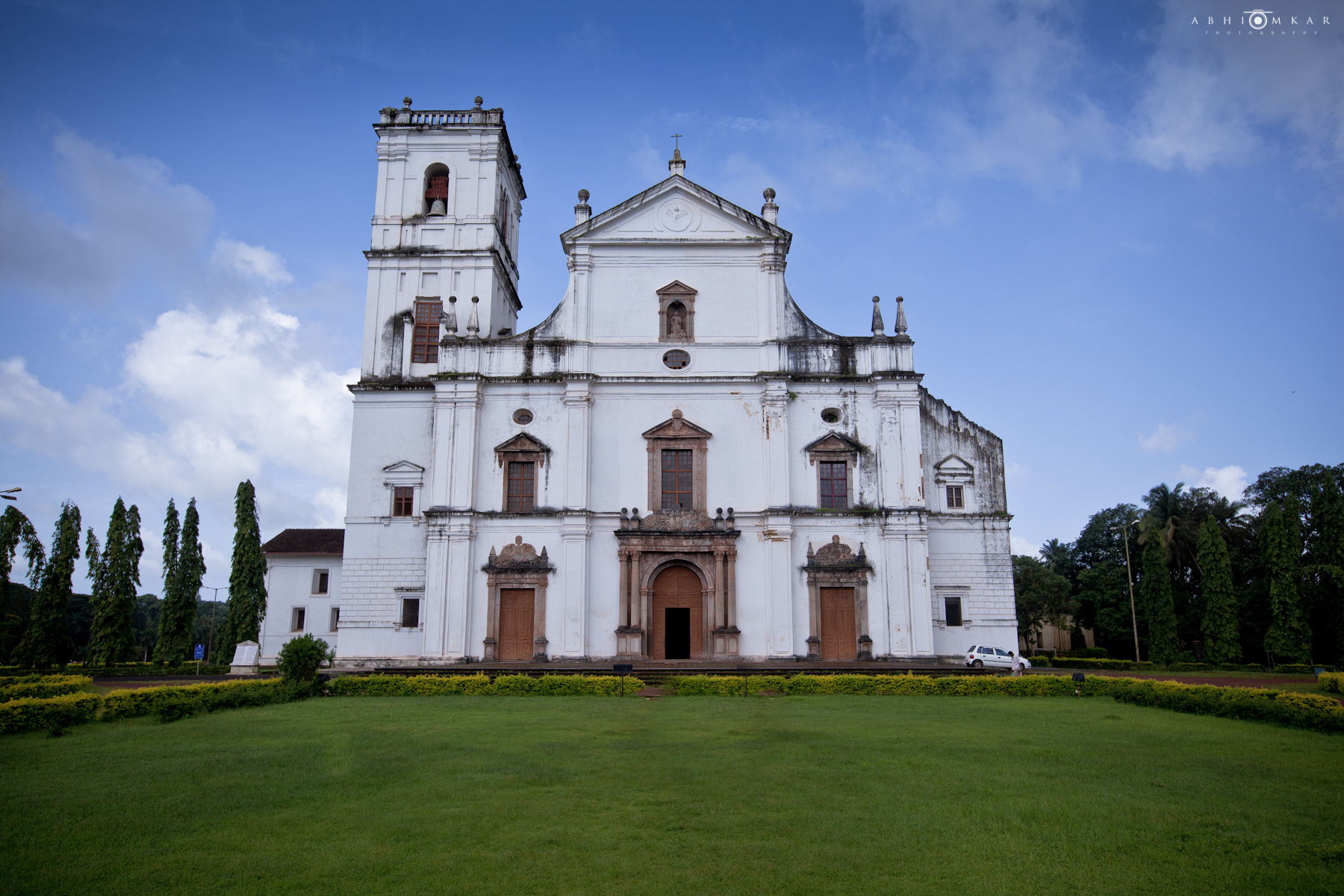
Sé Cathedral, Goa

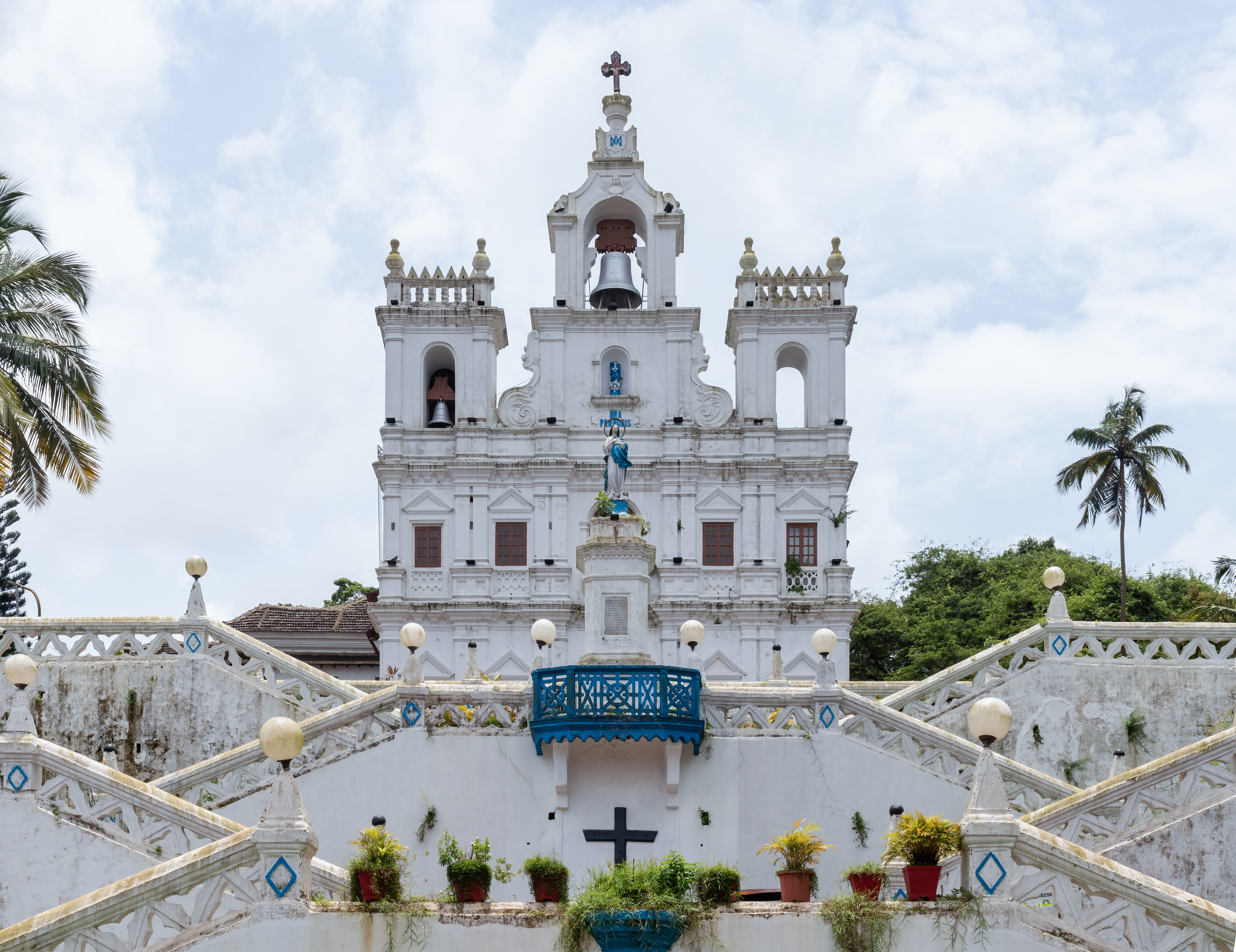
The church of Our Lady of the Immaculate Conception in Panaji (Goa, India).

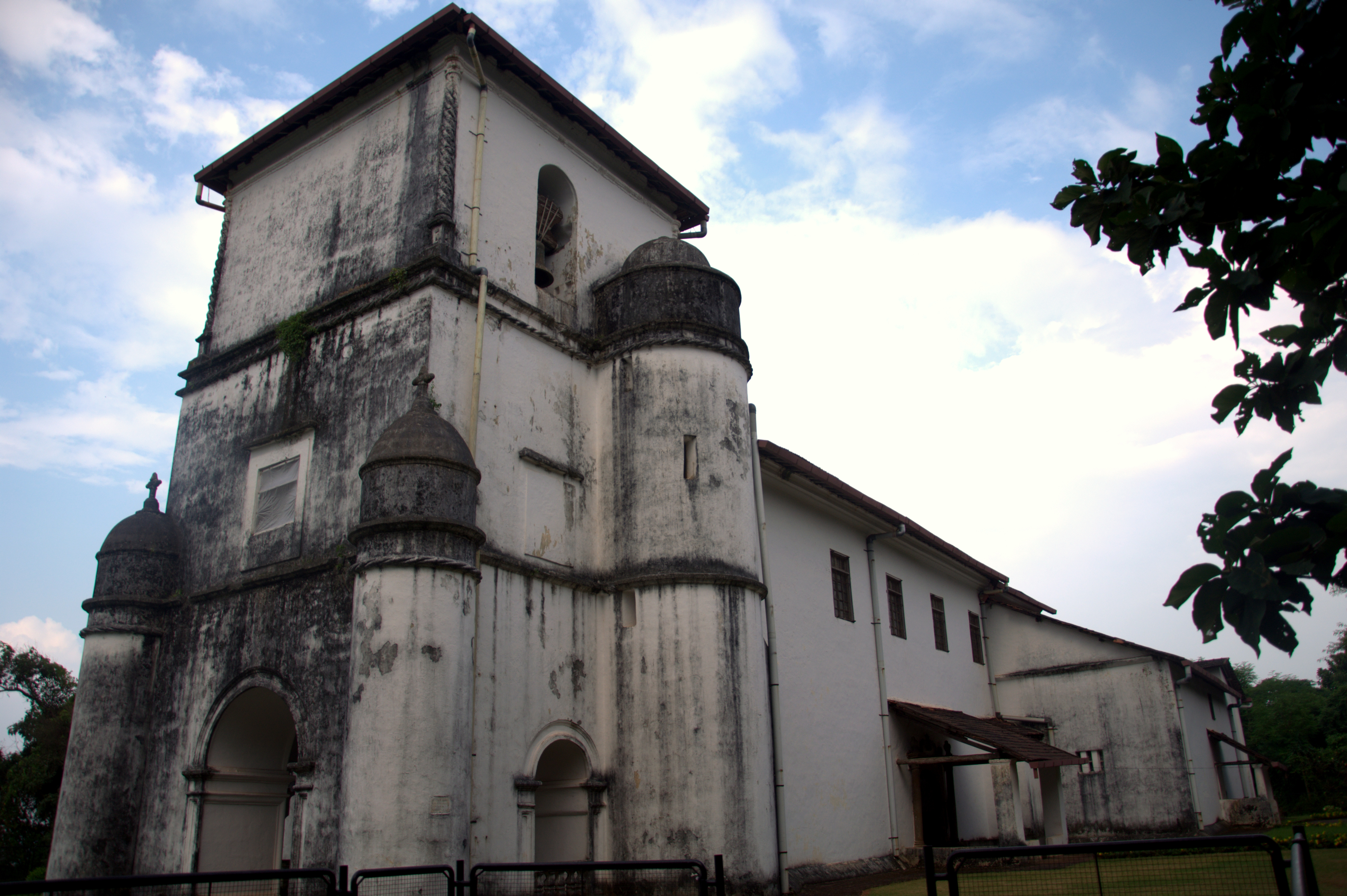
Old Goa, Church of Lady of Rosary

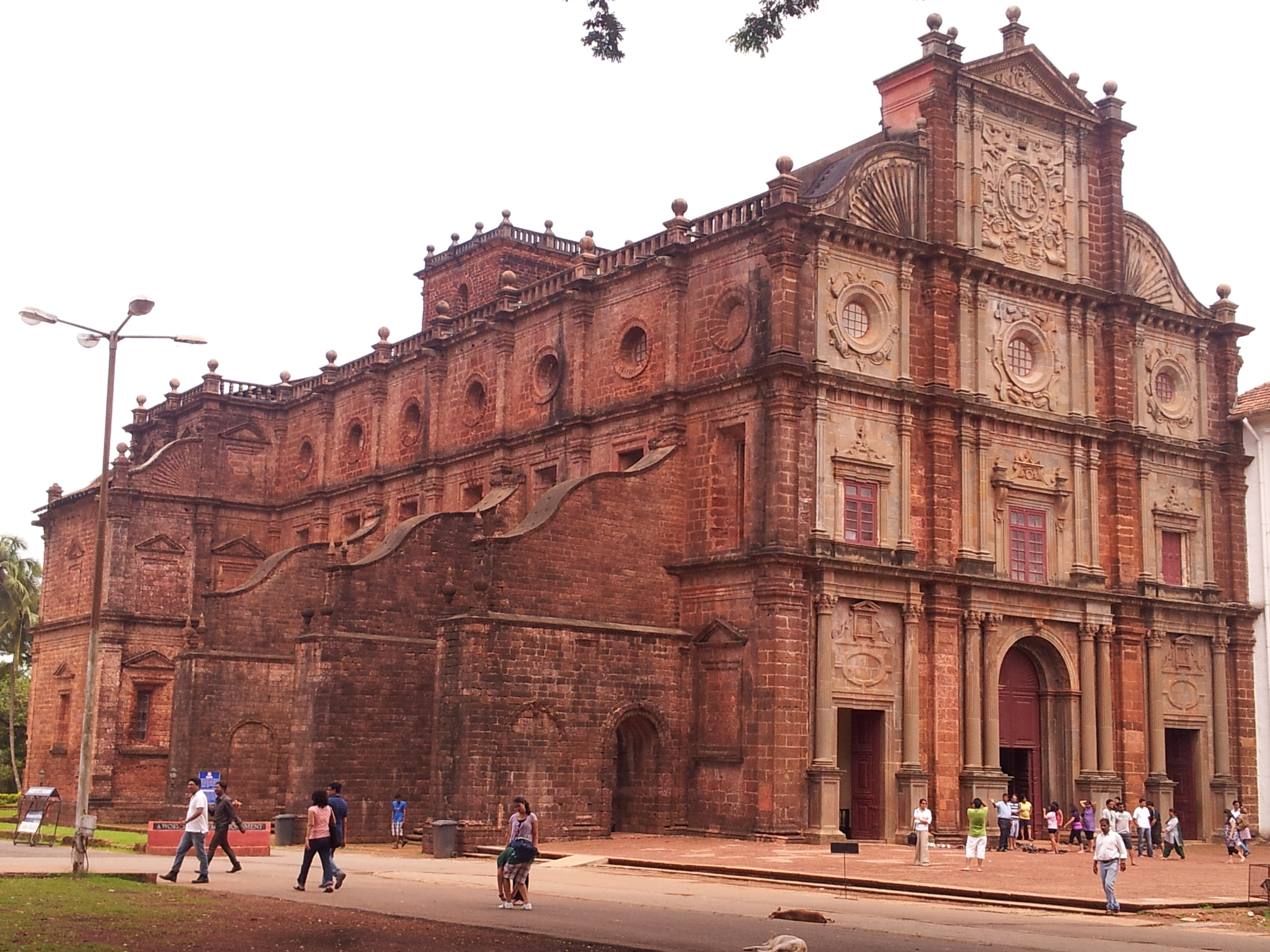
Bom Jesus Basilica, Goa.

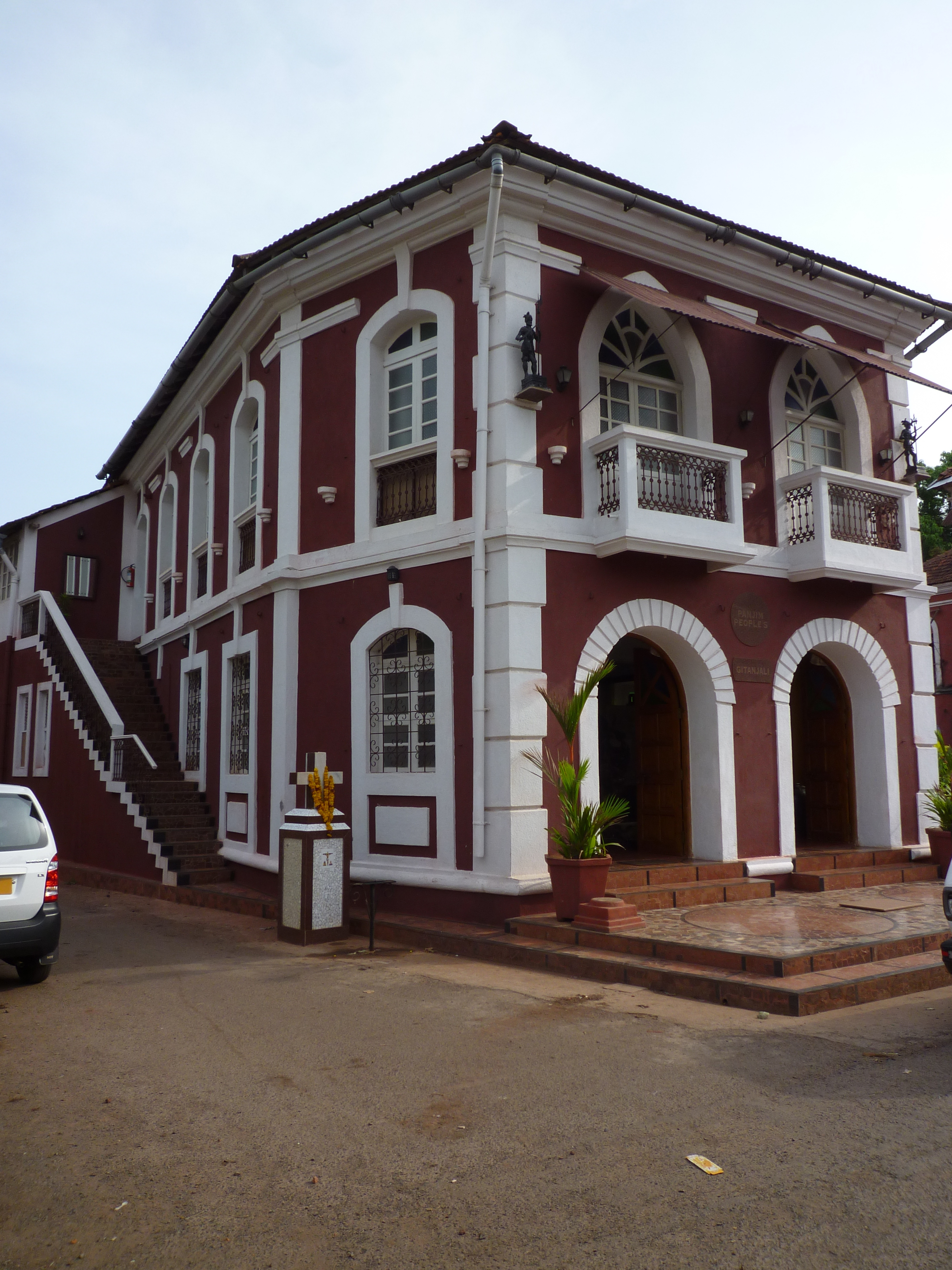
House in Goa.

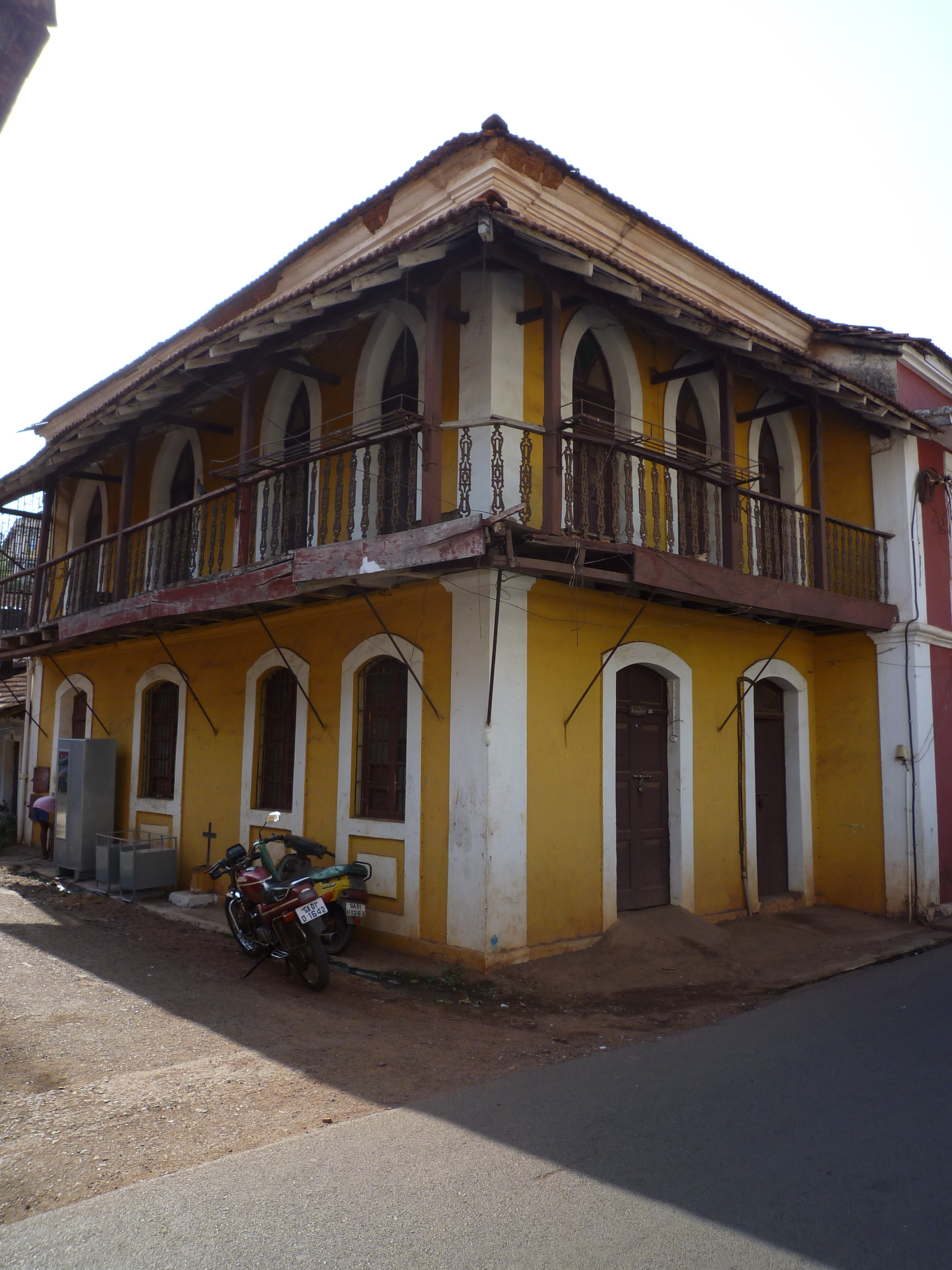
House in Goa.

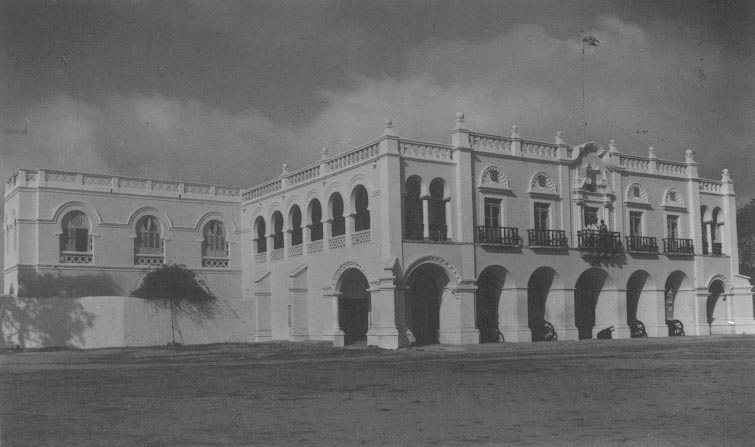
Governors palace in Diu.

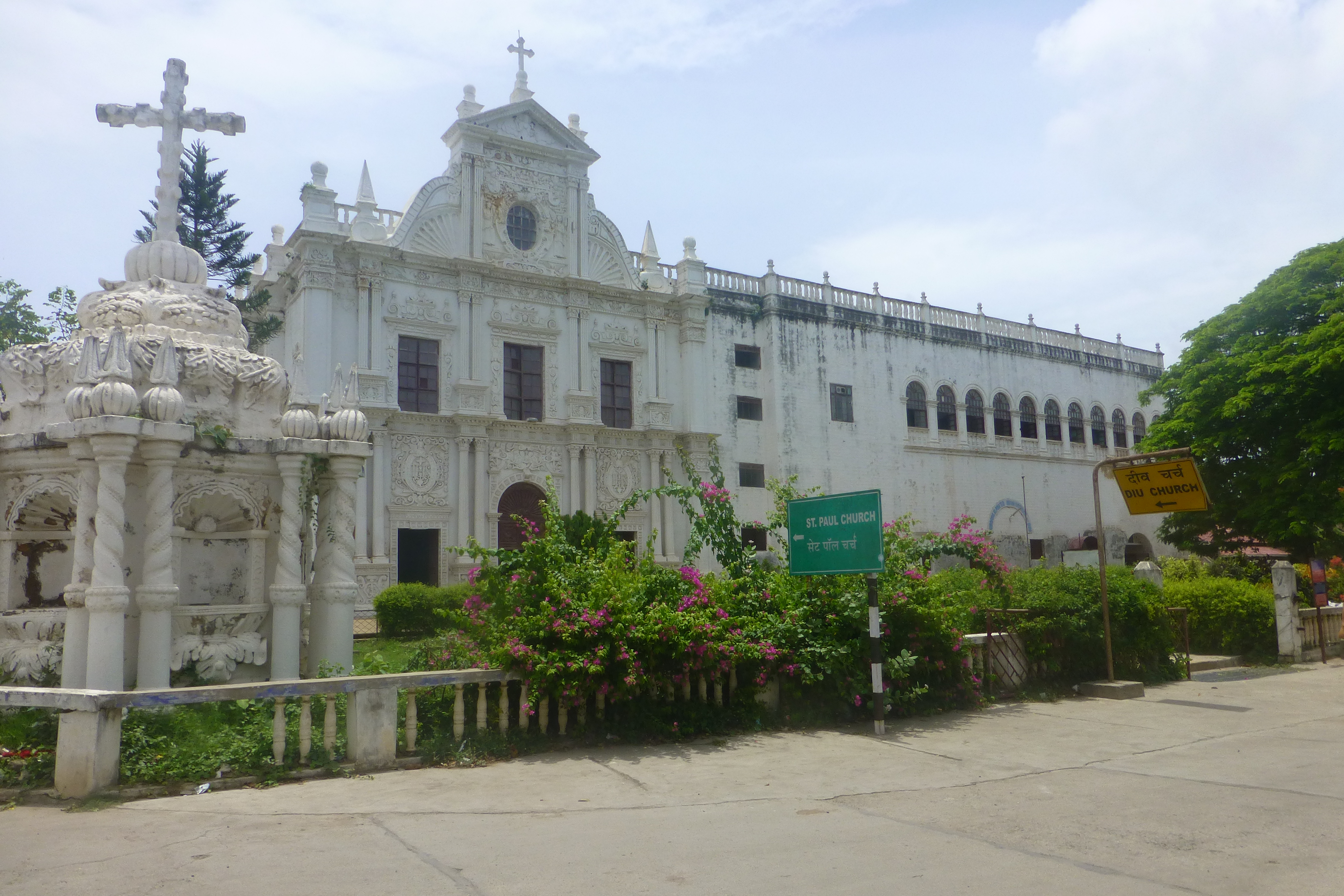
Church of São Paulo in Diu.

== See also ==
- Battle of Jambi
- Portuguese Empire
- Códice Casanatense
- Japan voyage
- Estado Novo (Portugal)
- Indo-Portuguese creoles
- List of governors of Portuguese India
- Arquivo Histórico Ultramarino (archives in Lisbon documenting Portuguese Empire, including India)
- Portuguese Indian rupia
- Portuguese Indian escudo
- Goa liberation movement
- Goa Civil Code
- Cuncolim Massacre
- History of Bombay under Portuguese rule (1534–1661)
- Portuguese Ceylon
- Portuguese Oman
- Colonial India
- Mughal–Portuguese conflicts
- Portuguese Negapatam
