= First Battle of Cannanore =

Part of the Portuguese battles in the Indian Ocean

Battle of Cannanore
- Part of First Luso-Malabarese War and Portuguese battles in the Indian Ocean
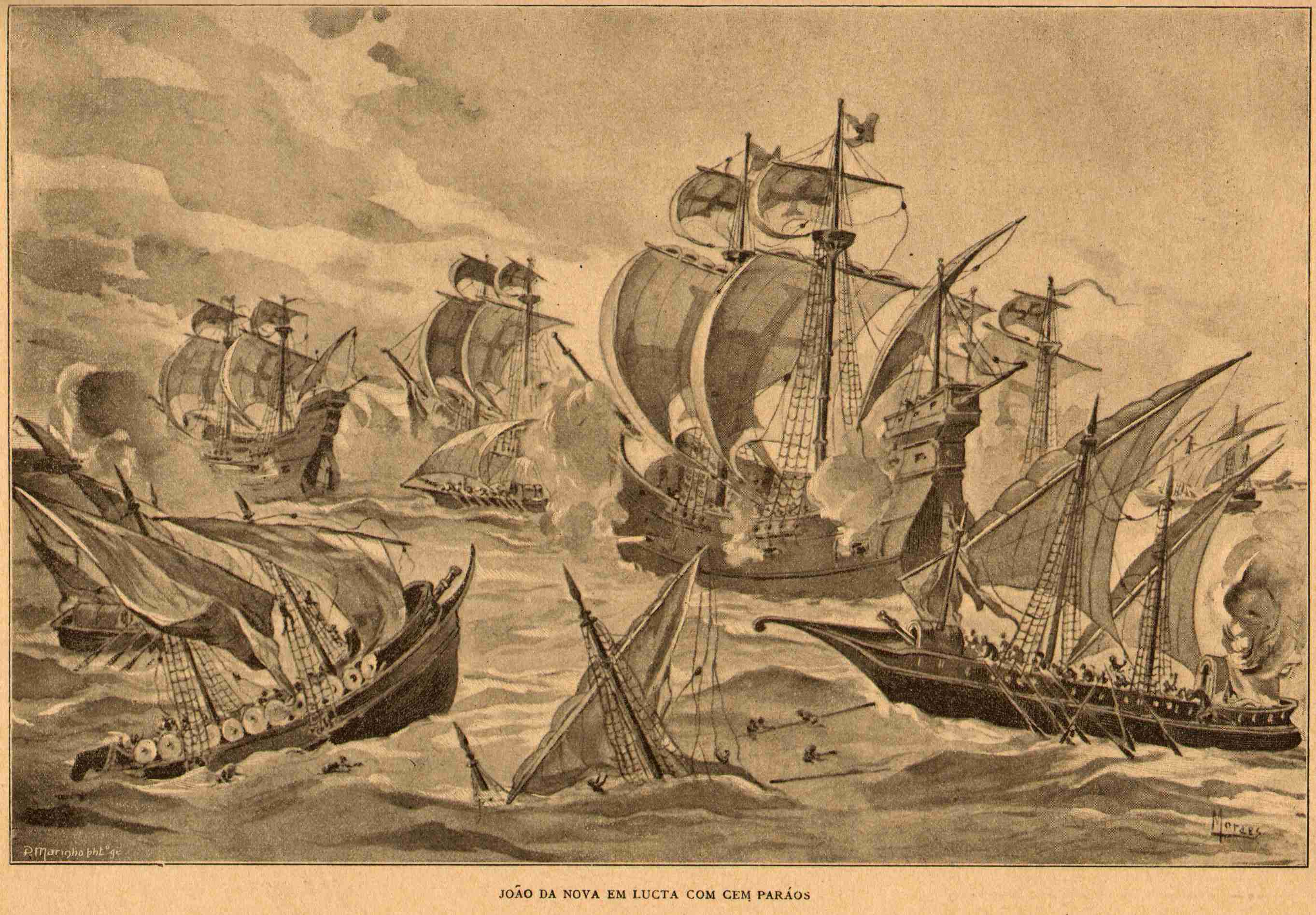
- Battle of Cannanore, drawing by Alfredo Roque Gameiro in the book História de Portugal, Popular e Ilustrada
Date	31 December 1501 – 2 January 1502 (2 days)
Location	Cannanore, India
Result	Portuguese victory

Belligerents
Portuguese Empire	Calicut

Commanders and leaders
João da Nova	Zamorin of Calicut

Strength
4 carracks	220+ vessels; 180 paraus and zambuks; 7,000 men

Casualties and losses
Unknown	Losses: 5 major ships; ~12 paraus and zambuks

The First Battle of Cannanore was a naval engagement between the Third Portuguese Armada under João da Nova and the naval forces of Calicut, which had been assembled by the Zamorin against the Portuguese in order to prevent their return to Portugal.

The battle was fought over two days, between 31 December 1501 and 2 January 1502, and was the first major Portuguese naval engagement in the Indian Ocean. Although badly outnumbered, da Nova's bold tactics, better trained and prepared men, and superior weaponry proved decisive for the Portuguese to defeat the blocking force of Calicut, break out of Cannanore, and emerge victorious from the battle.

The battle is also historically notable for being one of the earliest recorded deliberate uses of a naval line of battle, and for resolving the battle by cannon alone. These tactics would become increasingly prevalent as navies evolved and began to see ships less as carriers of armed men, and more as floating artillery. In that respect, this has been called the first 'modern' naval battle (at least for one side). After it, João da Nova returned to Portugal.

== See also ==
- Battle of Cannanore (1506)
