= Siege of Cannanore (1507) =

Siege in India

- Part of the First Luso-Malabarese War
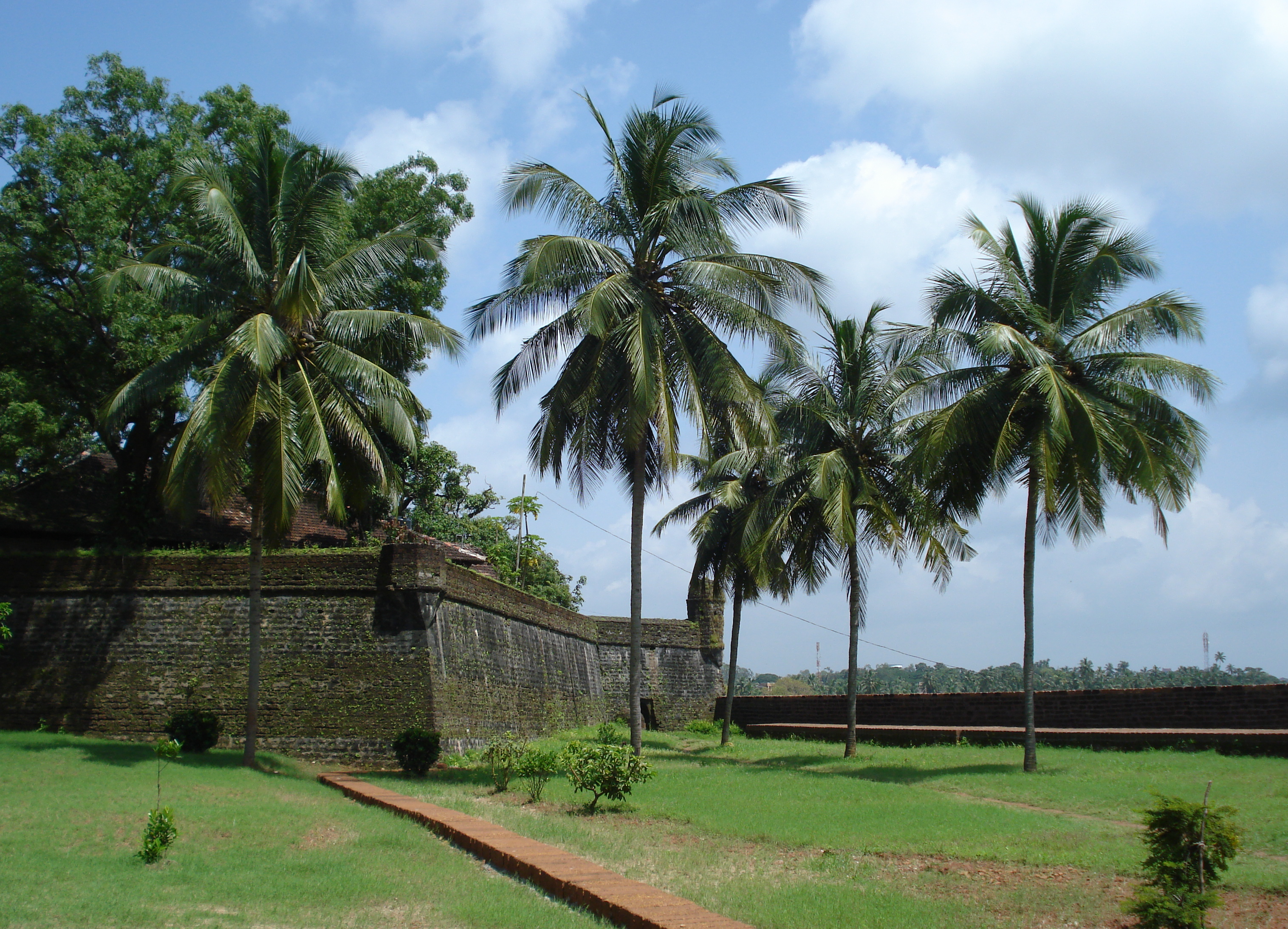
- St. Angelo Fort in Cannanore
Date	27 April – 27 August 1507 (4 months)
Location	Cannanore, India
Result	Portuguese victory

Belligerents
Portuguese Empire	Kōlattunād; Calicut

Commanders and leaders
Lourenço de Brito	Kolathiri; Samorin

Strength
2 ships 150 soldiers	21 cannons 40,000 Nāyars; 20,000 men from the Zamorin.

The siege of Cannanore was a four-month siege, from 27 April 1507 to 27 August 1507, when troops of the local ruler (the Kōlattiri Raja of Cannanore), supported by the Zamorin of Calicut besieged the Portuguese garrison at St. Angelo Fort in Cannanore, in what is now the Indian state of Kerala. It followed the Battle of Cannanore, in which the fleet of the Zamorin was defeated by the Portuguese.

== Background ==
In early 1501, shortly after the opening of hostilities between the Portuguese admiral Pedro Álvares Cabral and the Zamorin of Calicut, the Kōlattiri Raja of Cannanore invited the Portuguese to trade in the spice markets of Cannanore instead. Treaties were signed and a crown factory, defended by a small palisade, was established in 1502. In late 1505, D. Francisco de Almeida, the first Portuguese vice-roy of the Indies, secured permission to erect the stone fortress of Santo Angelo in Cannanore. The fortress garrison of 150 men was placed under the command of Lourenço de Brito.

The old Kolathiri Raja who had energetically pursued the Portuguese alliance died sometime in 1506. As the succession was disputed, the Zamorin of Calicut, as formal suzerain of the Kerala coast, nominated an arbitrator to sort through the candidates. The new Kolathiri Raja of Cannanore was consequently indebted to the Zamorin and less inclined to the Portuguese.

Hostilities were in large part due to the Portuguese sinking an Indian ship and killing the crew by stitching them into sails and throwing them into the sea, on the grounds that they were not carrying one of the Cartaz, the passes the Portuguese were imposing on all ships of the region. Such passes had to be signed by either the commander of Cochin or Cannanore. The population of the adjoining state of Kōlattunād was greatly angered by this event, and asked their ruler, the Kōlattiri, to attack the Portuguese.

== Siege ==
The siege started on 27 April 1507, and was to last for four months.

The Kōlattiri had 40,000 Nāyars attack the position. The Zamorin supplied the ruler of Cannanore with 21 pieces of artillery and 20,000 auxiliaries.

The firepower of the garrison under Lourenço de Brito allowed it to repulse massive attacks involving thousands of men. The siege soon entered a stalemate, with the Malabari trenches being protected from Portuguese cannon fire by walls of cotton bales, and the Portuguese being slowly forced into starvation. Castanheda's detailed report of the siege states that they were then surprised – and saved – by a tidal wave of lobsters that washed ashore on 15 August. A major assault before the Onam festival nearly overcame the defenders, but was eventually repulsed. However, a large part of the garrison was wounded in the attempt.

The Portuguese garrison was on the verge of being overwhelmed when, on 27 August 1507, a fleet of 11 8th Armada ships under Tristão da Cunha arrived from Socotra. The fleet landed 300 Portuguese soldiers, forcing the lifting of the siege and relieving the fortress.

Peace was negotiated between the Portuguese and the Kōlattiri Raja, confirming the continued presence of the Portuguese in Cannanore and the resumption of their access to its spice markets. These events would eventually be followed by the defeat of the Portuguese at the Battle of Chaul in 1508.

== See also ==
- Portuguese India
