= Battle of Cannanore (1506) =

Indo-Portuguese battle

- Part of the First Luso-Malabarese War
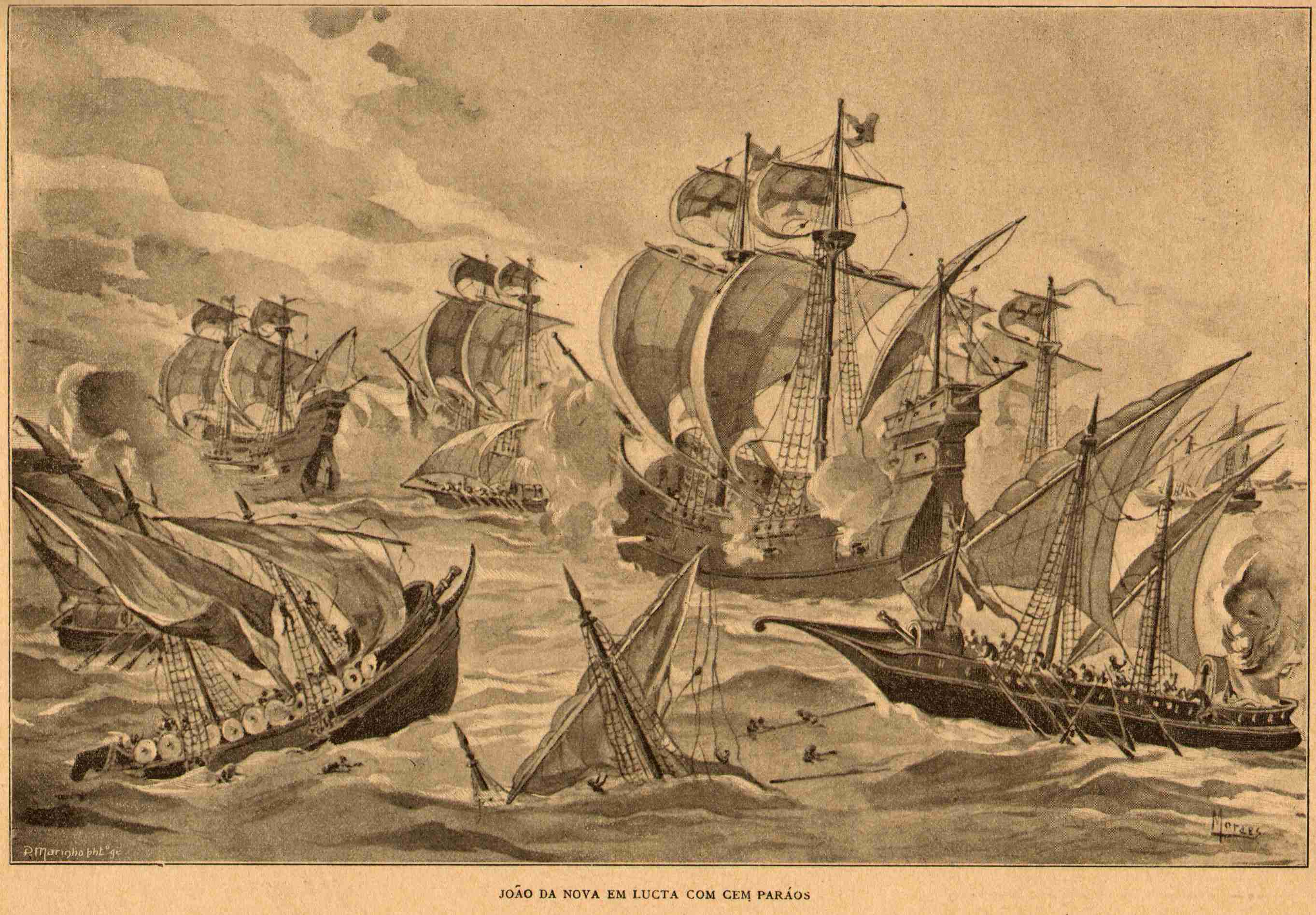
Date	March 1506
Location	Cannanore, India
Result	Portuguese victory

Belligerents
Portuguese Empire	Kingdom of Calicut

Commanders and leaders
Lourenço de Almeida; Ferdinand Magellan (WIA)	Samorin

Strength
3 naus 1 caravel several foists	Over 200 vessels

Casualties and losses
None	A few dozen ships

The Battle of Cannanore took place in 1506 off the harbour of Cannanore in India, between the Indian fleet of the Zamorin of Calicut and a Portuguese fleet under Lourenço de Almeida, son of the Viceroy Almeida.

The Indian fleet, consisting of about 200 ships equipped with cannons manufactured with the help of two Milanese Italians, was manned by Hindu, Arab, and Turkish crews. This encounter ended in a Portuguese victory. It was followed by another Portuguese success at the siege of Cannanore in 1507, but then a Portuguese defeat at the Battle of Chaul in 1508.

== See also ==
- Portuguese India
