= Amir Husain Al-Kurdi =

Admiral of the Mamluk Sultanate

- Imaginary painting of Husain Al-Kurdi

Governor of Jedda
- Monarch: Sultan of Egypt

Personal details
- Born: Unknown Cairo
- Died: 1517 Jeddah
- Occupation: Emir, Admiral

Amir Husain Al-Kurdi (Arabic: أمیر حسین الکردي), named Mihir Hussain or Mir-Hocém or Mirocém by the Portuguese, was an Egyptian governor of the city of Jeddah in the Red Sea, then part of the Mamluk Sultanate, in early 16th century. He stood out as admiral of the Egyptian Mamluk fleet fought by the forces of the Portuguese Empire in the Indian Ocean.

Shortly after the arrival of the Portuguese to the Indian sea, Mirocem was sent by the second to last Mamluk Sultan, Al-Ashraf Qansuh al-Ghawri, to defend his interests in the sea, including the defense of the fleets of Muslim pilgrims to Mecca, then part of the sultanate.

In 1508, he joined Malik Ayyaz, an admiral from Gujarat, as leader of the Mamluk fleet at the battle of Chaul, where they faced and defeated the fleet of Lourenço de Almeida, son of the Portuguese viceroy of India, D. Francisco de Almeida. Following this battle, he was fiercely fought by the viceroy himself, who in 1509 invested and won the Battle of Diu seeking Mirocem to avenge the death of his son and free the Portuguese prisoners made at Chaul in 1508.

Together with the Ottoman fleet of Selman Reis, Husain successfully defended Jeddah in 1517 from the Portuguese fleets of Lopo Soares de Albergaria, right before the fall of the Mamluk Sultanate to the Ottoman Empire.
