= Battle of Chaul =

Naval battle between the Mamluks and the Portuguese

Battle of Chaul (1508)
- Part of Mamluk–Portuguese conflicts and Gujarati–Portuguese conflicts
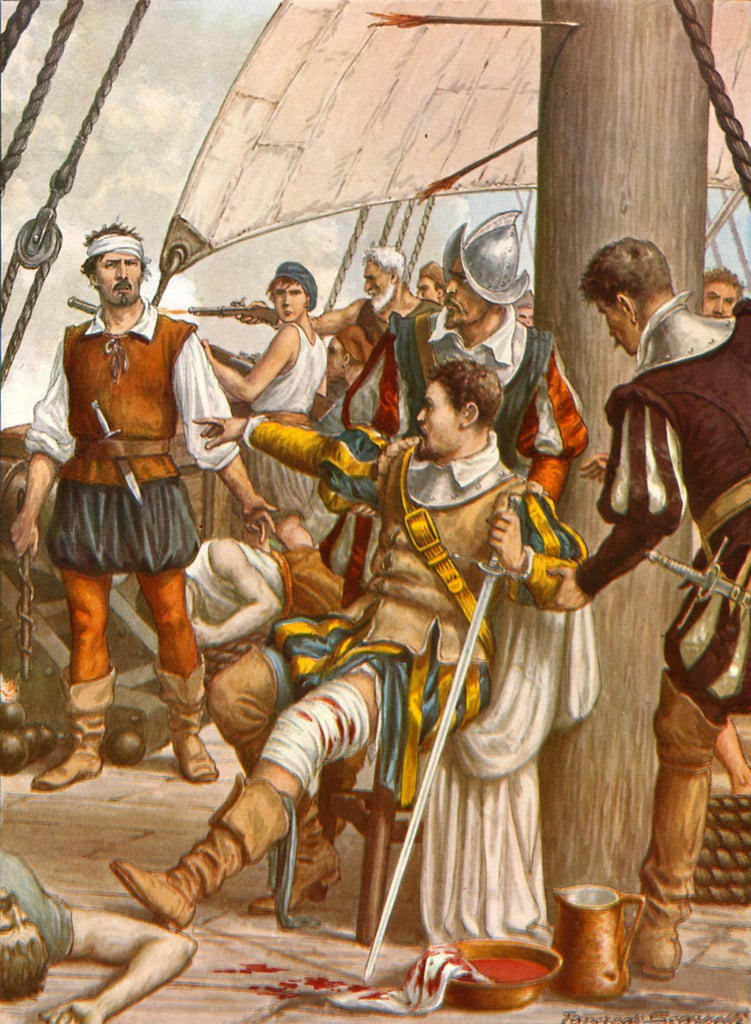
- Tancredi Scarpelli - The heroic end of Lorenzo d'Almeida in the battle of Chaul
Date	March 1508
Location	Chaul, India
Result	Mamluk-Gujarati victory

Belligerents
Portuguese Empire	Mamluk Sultanate; Gujarat Sultanate

Commanders and leaders
Lourenço de Almeida †	Amir Husain Al-Kurdi; Malik Ayyaz; Mayimama Marakkar †

Strength
3 ships and 5 caravels	6 Egyptian carracks and 6 great galleys, 1500 combatants 40 Gujarat Sultanate galleys

Casualties and losses
6 ships 140 men	600–700

The Battle of Chaul was a naval battle between the Portuguese and the Egyptian Mamluk fleets in 1508 in the harbour of Chaul in India. The battle ended in a Mamluk victory. It followed the Siege of Cannanore in which a Portuguese garrison successfully resisted an attack by southern Indian rulers. This was the first Portuguese defeat at sea in the Indian Ocean.

== Background ==
Previously, the Portuguese had been mainly active in Calicut, but the northern region of Gujarat was even more important for trade, and an essential intermediary in east–west trade: the Gujaratis were bringing spices from the Moluccas as well as silk from China, and then selling them to the Egyptians and Arabs.

The Portuguese' monopolizing interventions were however seriously disrupting Indian Ocean trade, threatening Arab as well as Venetian interests, as it became possible for the Portuguese to undersell the Venetians in the spice trade in Europe. Venice broke diplomatic relations with Portugal and started to look at ways to counter its intervention in the Indian Ocean, sending an ambassador to the Egyptian court. Venice negotiated for Egyptian tariffs to be lowered to facilitate competition with the Portuguese, and suggested that "rapid and secret remedies" be taken against the Portuguese. The sovereign of Calicut, the Zamorin, had also sent an ambassador asking for help against the Portuguese.

Since the Mamluks only had little in terms of naval power, timber had to be provided from the Black Sea in order to build the ships, about half of which was intercepted by the Hospitallers of St. John in Rhodes, so that only a fraction of the planned fleet could be assembled at Suez. The timber was brought overland on camel back, and assembled at Suez under the supervision of Venetian shipwrights.

== Preparations ==
The Mamluk fleet finally left in February 1507 under Amir Husain Al-Kurdi in order to counter the expansion of the Portuguese in the Indian Ocean and arrived in the Indian port of Diu in 1508 after delays subduing the city of Jeddha. It consisted of six round ships and six great galleys called galleasses. 1500 combatants were on board, as well as the ambassador of the Zamorin ruler of Calicut, Mayimama Marakkar.

The fleet was to join with Malik Ayyaz, a former Russian slave, who was in the service of the Sultan Mahmud Begada of Gujarat Sultanate, and was naval chief and master of Diu. The fleet was also planning to join with the Zamorin of Calicut, and then to raid and destroy all the Portuguese possessions on the Indian coast, but the Zamorin, who was expecting the Mamluk fleet in 1507 had already left.

== Battle ==
The Portuguese, under Lourenço de Almeida, son of the Viceroy Francisco de Almeida, were inferior in number with only a light force, and located in the nearby harbour of Chaul. The rest had sailed north to protect shipping and fight the so-called piracy. When the Mamluks sailed into Chaul, Almeida's main artillery captain, the German-born Michael Arnau, advised to bombard the enemy fleet from afar. However, Almeida ordered to board the enemy ships, as a victory by afar would be neither honorale nor profitable. His tactics, however, went awry due to the size and number of the enemy ships and the sea's currents. The Mamluks fought for two days inconclusively with the Portuguese. Finally, Malik Ayaz sailed in with his own galleys. The Portuguese had to retreat, and Almeida's ship was sunk at the entrance of Chaul harbour with Almeida aboard. Amir Hussain returned to the port of Diu, but from that point abandoned any further initiative on the Indian coast, his ships becoming derelict and his crews dispersing.

== Aftermath ==
Although a victory for the Muslim forces, the result had been largely pyrrhic. Hussain had lost between 600 and 700 out of a total of 800 soldiers and the remainder of his forces now feared European weaponry.

The Portuguese later returned and attacked the fleet in the harbour of Diu, leading to a decisive victory in the battle of Diu.

These events would be followed by a new Ottoman intervention in 1538, with the siege of Diu.

== See also ==
- Battle of Cannanore
- Portuguese India
