= Malik Ayyaz =

Gujarat Sultante's governor of Sorath

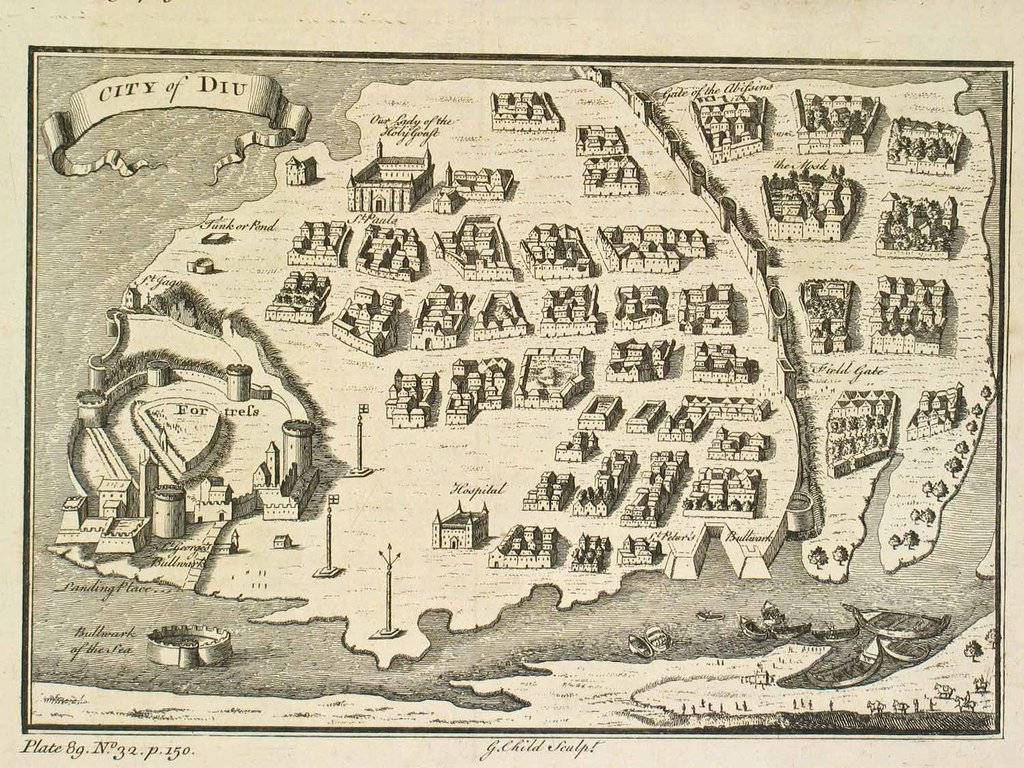
Diu city and the Portuguese fort (British engraving, 1729)

Malik Ayyaz, called Meliqueaz by the Portuguese, was a naval officer and governor of the city of Diu, in the mouth of the Gulf of Khambhat (Cambay), circa 1507–1509 under the rule of Gujarat Sultanate. He was one of the most distinguished warriors of his time.

Meliqueaz was a Mamluk of Dalmatian Christian origin, who had been imprisoned and converted to Islam. Taken to India he went to the Gujarat Sultanate and he distinguished at the service of the Sultan Mahmud Begada of Gujarat (Malik being the equivalent of Lord). At that time Gujarati were important middlemen in the trade with Red Sea, Egypt, and Malacca, and when the Portuguese threatened this field, the Sultan put the defense in the hands of Meliqueaz. With the aim at expelling the Portuguese from the Arabian Sea, the sultan allied with the zamorin of Khozikode and asked the Mamluk Sultanate of Cairo for help. With Ottoman support, the Mamluks prepared then a fleet in the Red Sea.

In March 1508, commanded by Mirocem (Amir Husain Al-Kurdi), the Mamluk fleet arrived at Chaul where they surprised a Portuguese fleet. Joined by Meliqueaz they fought and won the Battle of Chaul against Lourenço de Almeida, son of the Portuguese viceroy. Lourenço was killed in battle, and several Portuguese were taken prisoner.

Enraged at the death of his son, the Portuguese viceroy Francisco de Almeida sought revenge. Aware of the danger facing his city, Meliqueaz prepared the defence and wrote to the viceroy, stating that he had the prisoners and how bravely his son had fought, adding a letter from the Portuguese prisoners stating that they were well treated. The viceroy then wrote to Meliqueaz, stating his intention of revenge and that they better join all forces and prepare to fight, or he would destroy Diu:

I the Viceroy say to you, honored Meliqueaz captain of Diu, that I go with my men to this city of yours, taking the people who were welcomed there, that in Chaul fought my people, and killed a man who was called my son, and I come with hope in God of Heaven to take revenge on them and on those who assist them, and if I don't find them I will take your city, to pay for everything, and you, for the help you have done at Chaul, this I tell you, so that you are well aware that I go, as I am now on this island of Bombay, as it will tell you the one who this letter brings.(in Portuguese)

Put in a double bind, he faced the viceroy at the Battle of Diu which ended in victory for the Portuguese, with terrible losses on the Gujarat-Mamluk-Khozikode side, after which Meliqueaz handed over the prisoners of Chaul, dressed and well fed. To his surprise, Francisco de Almeida, who was ending his term as viceroy, refused his offer to allow a Portuguese fortress in Diu, an offer that the Portuguese soon sought ardently, and which he managed to stall for as long as he was governor of Diu. The fort would be built only in 1535–1536.

== See also ==
- Gujarati–Portuguese conflicts

== Bibliography ==
- "The book of Duarte Barbosa: an account of the countries bordering on the Indian Ocean and their inhabitants", p. 130, Duarte Barbosa, Mansel Longworth Dames, Asian Educational Services, 1989, ISBN 81-206-0451-2
- Andrew James McGregor, "A military history of modern Egypt: from the Ottoman Conquest to the Ramadan War", Greenwood Publishing Group, 2006, ISBN 0-275-98601-2
