= Mayimama Marakkar =

Indian ambassador (died 1508)

Mayimama Marakkar was an Indian ambassador of the Zamorin ruler of Calicut. In 1504, he went on an embassy to the Mamluk ruler in order to obtain an intervention against the Portuguese who were preying on India.

He returned to India in 1508 with a Mamluk fleet of 12 ships, which, in combination with the local forces of Gujarat defeated a Portuguese fleet in the Battle of Chaul (1508).

Marakkar had initially been a Muslim merchant who had had a dispute with the Raja of Cannanore, and following a complaint of the Raja had been gravely mishandled by the Portuguese Captain Vicente Sodré. He had held a desire for revenge since then.

He was killed in the 1508 naval encounter at Chaul.
