= Siege of Diu =

Siege of Diu may refer to one of the following conflicts fought within or on the waters off the Island of Diu:

- Battle of Diu (1509)
- Siege of Diu (1531)
- Siege of Diu (1538)
- Siege of Diu (1546)
- Annexation of Goa (1961) which involved the Indian invasion of Diu.
