= Siege of Jeddah =

1517 battle between Portuguese and Mamluk Sultanate of Egypt

- Part of the Portuguese–Mamluk naval war, Ottoman–Portuguese confrontations
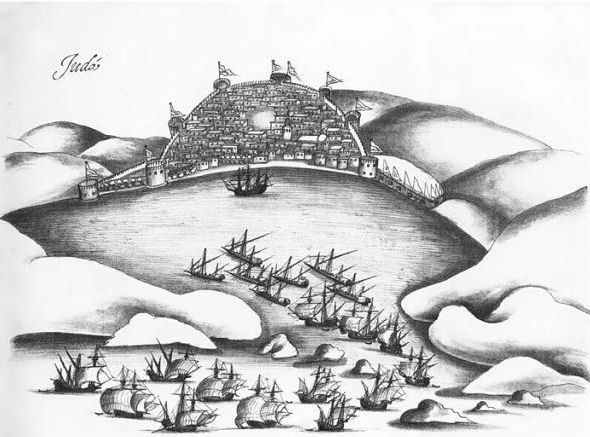
Date	12 April 1517
Location	Jeddah, Arabia and the Red Sea
Result	Ottoman–Mamluk victory

Belligerents
Portuguese Empire	Ottoman Empire; Mamluk Sultanate

Commanders and leaders
Lopo Soares de Albergaria	(Ottoman Empire) Selman Reis (Mamluk Sultanate) Amir Husain Al-Kurdi

Strength
36 to 43 sails (15 naus), 1,800 to 5,400 men	19 ships, 3,000 soldiers (including 1,300 Turks)

Casualties and losses
2 or 3 ships destroyed	1 ship partially damaged due to accident fire

The siege of Jeddah was a naval battle that took place in the harbor of Jeddah between a Portuguese expeditionary force under Lopo Soares de Albergaria and Ottoman elements under Selman Reis, and Egyptian Mamluks fleet. The Portuguese fleet arrived off the city’s coast on Easter day, 1517 (12 April), Hijri year 923, and moored in the channel. After a quick naval action that day with few casualties, shore artillery prevented the Portuguese from landing, and weather ultimately caused them to withdraw.

== Background ==
Relations between the Portuguese and Mamluks were hostile in the years leading up to the Siege of Jeddah given recent Portuguese trade incursions in the Indian Ocean and Middle East. The islands of Socotra and Hormuz had been captured and fortified by the Portuguese to control trade routes into the Red Sea and the Persian Gulf in 1506 and 1515, respectively. Because of this, loose allegiances between Levantine mercenaries and the Mamluks began to form as they joined forces in fighting the Portuguese. Selman Reis under Amir Husain al-Kurdi assisted with ships and provisions in the defense of the city, against the wishes of Ottoman Sultan Selim I.

Defensive works to fortify the city against attack had been ongoing since 1506, Hijri year 912, and included the addition of a perimeter wall, 8 towers, and many artillery batteries.

A 1762 map of Jeddah harbor and defenses from C. Niebuhr’s Reisebeshreibung nach Arabien und andern umliegenden Landern (vol.1) shows some of these defenses, including the 1) House of the Pasha, 2) Bāb Sharīf, 3) Bāb Jadīd, 4) Bāb Makka, 5) Mecca road watchtowers, 6) Salt-harvesting land, 7) Christian cemetery, 8) Battery tower ruins, 9) Port of the Galleys, 10) Niebuhr and companion’s house, 11) Customs house, 12) House of the Kiḫya, 13) Eve’s tomb, 14) Coral and shell hills, and 15) Anchorage for ships from India and Suez.

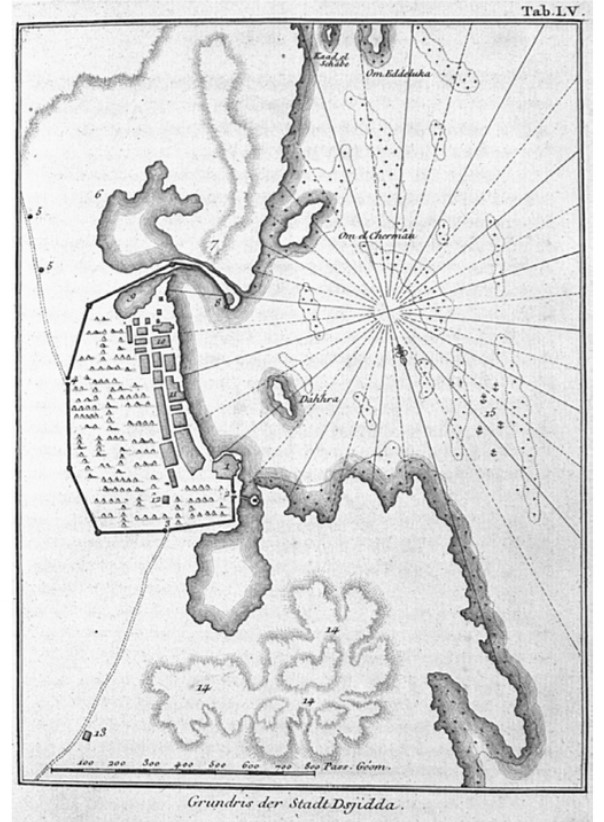
Jeddah Defenses 1762

== Battle ==
After sailing from Goa, the Portuguese arrived in Aden in February of 1517, where they took on local sea-pilots to help them navigate to Jeddah. After the Portuguese fleet arrived in Jeddah on Easter day 1517, (12 April), Hijri year 923, Muslim and Portuguese accounts of the battle differ.

According to the sources, upon spotting the Portuguese fleet in the harbor, Admiral Selman Reis "sought them out in a grab or two…[and] fired on them with his guns, destroying two or three out of their ships." At some point in the action, one of the cannon suffered a catastrophic failure and exploded. The Hadrami Chronicler Al-Shihri recounts that:

"Then the gunner put something in the powder so that the gun went out of action, and the fire burned part of the grab where Selman was; it is said that the gunner was a Christian serving with Selman – but Selman executed the gunner and returned to Jeddah safe and sound"

Although his ship was partially burnt, Selman’s assault proved successful in repelling the Portuguese, who sailed off in the direction of Yemen.

== Portuguese account ==
The Portuguese account, in contrast, relates that after arriving in the harbor, the main force found itself unable to land because of shore artillery. Although the Portuguese were able to burn a few of the moored ships, a galleon and one or two galleys, weather conditions made navigation impossible. After 13 days of waiting for the weather to clear, damages to their vessels, and a growing lack of water, the Portuguese eventually called off the attack.

== Aftermath ==
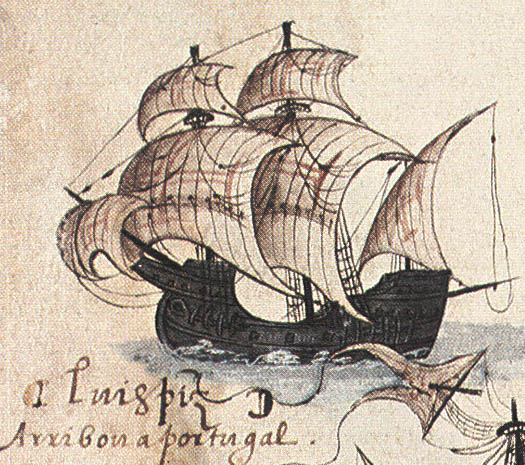
Portuguese carrack belonging to capt. Luís Pires, depicted in Memórias das Armadas, 1568.

The Portuguese withdrew to Kamaran Island, where they were becalmed for around 3 months. Lopo Soares de Albergaria soon needed to restock supplies and sent a brigantine to trade with the local Arab peoples. The resupply mission soon went awry since, "Selman or one of his men followed them [the Portuguese ship] in a grab to the vicinity of al-Luhaiyah [Al Luhayyah]" where they captured the 17 Portuguese sailors and sent them to Constantinople. Only one was able to escape and return to Portugal to tell the story.

Although the Portuguese failed to take the city, they still blockaded it by forcing the governor of Calicut (Kozhikode) to limit trade to Jeddah. Additionally, the historian Ibn Iyas reveals that "Husayn, the superintendent of Jedda, took a tenth of the value of the goods of the Indian merchants, so they refrained from coming to the port of Jedda and its condition turned to the worse." Soon, the combined blockade and taxes resulted in Jeddah no longer being a key trading port.

== See also ==
- History of Portugal
- Military history of Portugal
- Ottoman–Mamluk War (1516–1517)
- Attack on Jeddah (1541)
