= Hoca Sefer =

Ottoman captain in charge of the pro-Ottoman forces

Hoca Sefer (Ottoman Turkish: خواجه سفر; fl. 1536–38) was an Ottoman captain in charge of the pro-Ottoman forces in Gujarat in the first half of the 16th century. Hoca Sefer, who had been installed by the Ottoman captain Selman Reis, attempted to maintain Ottoman influence in Diu against the Portuguese, who had established the Diu Fort there. The conflict between the Ottomans and the Portuguese would escalate with the Siege of Diu in 1538, following the request for Ottoman intervention by Sultan Bahadur Shah of Gujarat in 1536.
