= Khoja Zufar =

16th century general in Western India

Khoja Zufar or Coge Cofar
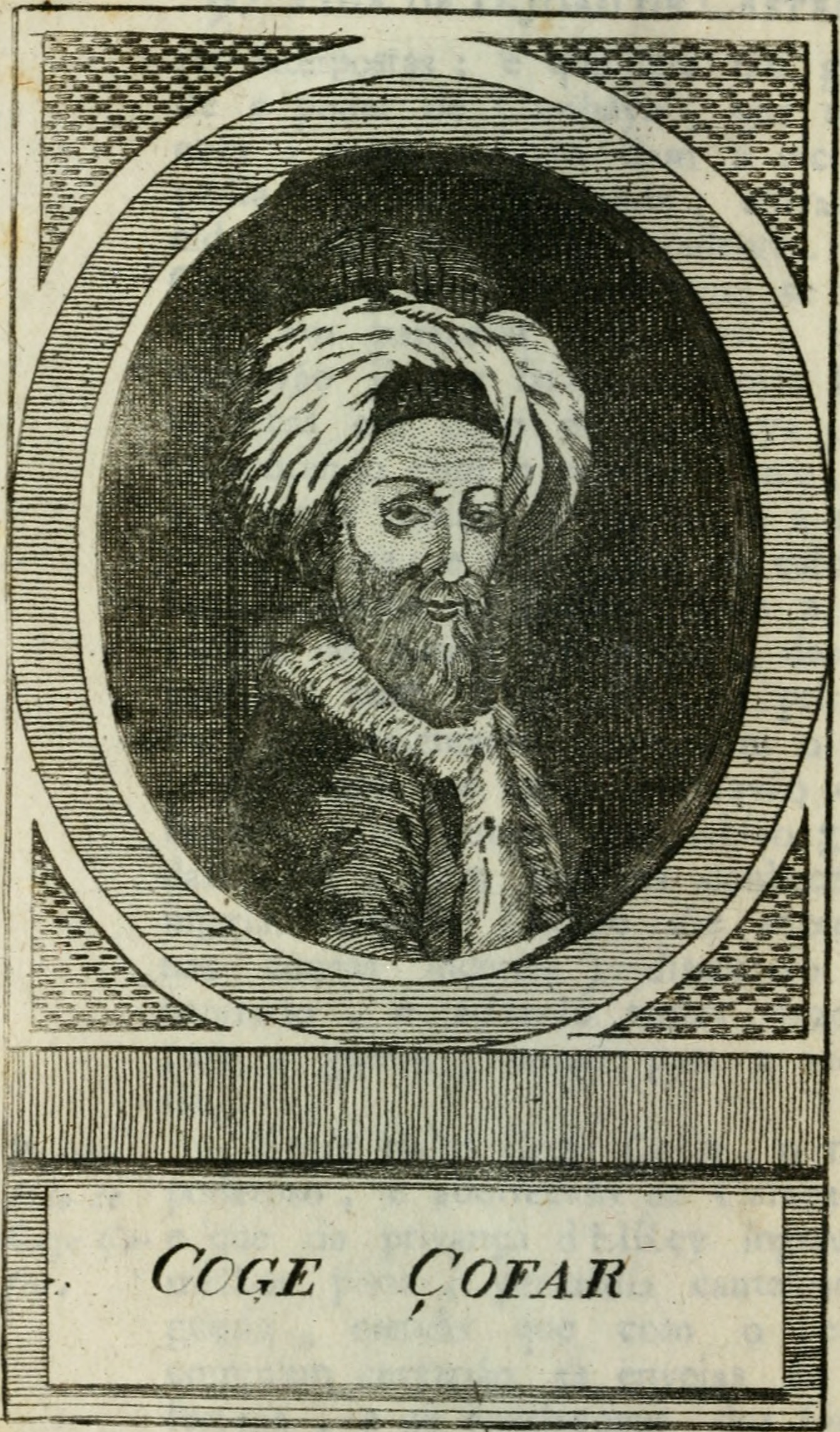
- Drawing from 1520–1790
- Born: 1500; Otranto, Apulia, Kingdom of Naples
- Died: 24 June 1546 (aged 45–46); Diu, India
- Relatives: Friend of Garcia de Orta
- Military career
- Allegiance: Ottoman Empire
- Service years: 1515–1546
- Rank: General
- Nickname: Khoje Cofar or Coge Cofar
- Commands: Ottoman naval forces
- Conflicts: Ottoman–Portuguese conflicts; Battle of al-Shihr (1531); Siege of Diu (1531); Siege of Diu (1538); Siege of Diu (1546) †
- Awards: Governor of Diu

Khoja Zufar or Coje Çafar (1500 – 24 June 1546 - probably born a few years before 1500), also called Coge Sofar, or Safar Aga in Portuguese, Cosa Zaffar in Italian, and also as Khwaja Safar Salmani or Khuádja Tzaffar (خوجا زفار), was a soldier and local ruler in Western India during the 16th century. He was a leader in the failed Siege of Diu. Zufar was an experienced merchant with the distant markets of the Arabian Gulf around the Strait of Mecca and Lepanto at the Mediterranean.

== Name ==
For centuries, his name has been given in different forms, depending on whether the writer is English, an Ottoman Turk, or Portuguese. The variations of his name include Khoja Zufar, Coje Çafar, Coge Sofar, and Khojah Zaffar. Muhammad III of Gujarat had forced him to become muslim and to change his Christian name to "Khwaja". He was later known as Khudawand Khan Safar Salmani.

== Early life ==
Zufar was born in Otranto, into an Albanian family. His mother was from Brindisi. He was born to Catholic Albanian parents in Otranto in the Kingdom of Naples in modern-day Italy.

He began his career as a military adventurer, serving in the armies of Italy and Flanders, and was captured at sea at the age of fifteen by an Ottoman general Selim I. The Ottoman sultan was impressed by the young Zufar and sent him to Constantinople where he was put in command of several vessels to attack the Portuguese. He was then sent to Cambaya (Khambhat) where he became good friends with King Bahadur Shah of Gujarat. He was also the captain of the king.

Around 1527, Khoja Zufar took refuge in Diu, where he was met with great respect, and with him he had 300 000 "cruzados" and 600 Turkish soldiers.

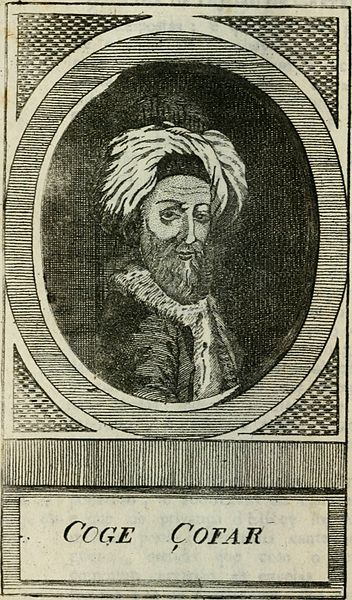
"Portuguese drawing of Khoja Zufar (Coge Cofar) from 1798"

== War with the Portuguese ==
In February 1531, Khoja Zufar and Ottoman Admiral Mustafa entered the harbor of Diu, a Portuguese island fortress on the coast of the Gujarat Sultanate in what is now Western India. In 1532, Zufar established himself in Gujarat, and obtained privileges in Surat and Diu, becoming the general of the Muslim forces. Here he was known as "Khoja Sofar of Surat". He initially cooperated with the Portuguese who put him in charge of Diu, but when he heard of Hadım Suleiman Pasha's naval expedition, he betrayed the Portuguese and joined Suleiman. Among the sailors of Suleiman were many of Venetian origin. Prior to Zufar's change of allies, he had been very offended by Suleiman Pasha's arrogance.

== Zufar meeting Nuno da Cunha and Antonio da Silveira ==
In February 1537, when Bahadur Shah of Gujarat was killed on his ship by the Portuguese, led by Nuno da Cunha, Zufar abandoned ship and swam ashore where he was well met by the Portuguese, who massacred the rest of Bahadurs crew. Cunha was so impressed by Zufar that he recommended him to Portuguese commander Antonio da Silveira de Menezes. Khoja then fled to King Mahmud of Cambaya, where Khoja was instructed to once again fight the Portuguese, with the help of the Ottoman fleet which was on its way. Khoja then appeared in front of the city of Rums, near Diu, where he was wounded in the arm. Zufar was aided by the local kings which resulted in Silveira ordering his men to abandon the town and instead fortify the port. When the Ottoman fleet arrived, Silveira sent letter to Nunho asking for help.

== Suleiman Pasha's fleet ==
In 1537, the Portuguese sent a fleet to attack Diu, which was defended by Zufar's land forces. Suleiman witnessed the preparations:

... venne un chiamato il Cosa Zaffer, il quale é da Otranto, ma renegato, et fatto turcho, et era patrone di una galea quando il Signore Turcho mandó l'altra armata ...

Translation:

... there came a lad called the Khoja Zuffar, who is from Otranto, but a renegade, and made Turk, and was the patron of a galley when the Sultan sent the other army ...

In 1537, Sultan Bahadur and Khoja Zufar agreed to meet with the Portuguese governor Nuno da Cunha in Diu, on his ship and despite being warned, Bahadur was murdered and his body thrown into the ocean, while Zufar barely escaped onto the ship of Antonio de Soto-Maior. Determined to avenge himself, Zufar wrote to his relative Nacoda Hamede, the ruler of Zebit, to send the Ottoman army to India, to which the Sultan approved. According to Portuguese author Luís Vaz Camões letters published in 1776, Zufar and Nunio had been serving together in service of the Portuguese, but Zufar, with a party of locals of Cambaya, switched side and joined Hadim Suleiman Pasha.

In April 1538, Zufar, having received news of the Portuguese fleet preparing for war, secretly sent his wife and children to safety. He then presented himself before the new sultan, Mahmud III, who made him governor of Surat with the title of Khudawand Khan. Zufar then made an attack on the outer fort of Diu, driving the Portuguese into the city, and initiating the Siege of Diu which was made possible thanks to Zufar's close friend Ruy Freire, a Portuguese who collected information. In June 1538, Zufar was wounded by the Portuguese, and attacked again on June 26 with 4,000 men outside the village of Rome.

Throughout his reign as a governor, Zufar had urged the Muslim leader of Gujarat to expel the Portuguese, who had taken possession of Surat Port and robbed the city at the beginning of the century. The following quote is attributed to him, as part of a speech to his men about the Portuguese:

Que temos que recear deste Império de loucos, que com um braço na Ásia e outro no Ocidente, querem abarcar o Mundo?

Translation:

What do we have to fear from this Empire of mad-men, who with one arm in Asia and the other in the West want to embrace the world?

Delayed by other conflicts, Suleiman arrived with a fleet of 72 vessels, and told his men of a certain "Cosazaffer who originally came from Otranto and was a renegade for Islam". In 1540, to resist the attacks of the Portuguese, Zufar constructed a strong, high, and large fort in the place of the small old fort. The Portuguese protested against the decision.

Zufar had a personal relationship with Garcia de Orta as he would receive gifts of curcas (cataputia minor), from Zufar. In 1542, a ship filled with 60,000 pieces of Venetian gold was sent to Zufar, to prepare for the incoming fleet. In 1545, Zufar attempted another siege of Diu and failed.

In 1546, Zufar complained that his merchant vessels were harassed by the Portuguese cartaz which resulted in skirmishes with the Portuguese fleets. The Sultan, determined to retake Diu, applied for support from Indo-Islamic states.

In 1546, Zufar fortified his base at Surat and persuaded the sultan of Gujarat to once again attack Diu. In March, 1546, Zufar appeared in front of Diu with 7,000 "guzatteres" and 1,000 Turks in order to take it from the Portuguese. Their leader, Dom Joao Mascarenhas, defended the city as did his predecessor Antonio da Silveira. Portuguese women participated in the defence as well. The sieges failed and Suleiman departed on November 5. Zufar then set fire to his encampment and abandoned the island of Diu.

According to Diogo do Cuoto, the keeper of the Portuguese Record Office in Goa, throughout the 1540s, Zufar received letters every year from his mother, a Catholic, who was much upset that Zufar had converted to Islam.

== International writings ==
C. K. Goertz wrote that "Safar Salmani was a man of genius and determination, circumspection and foresight, and it was upon these qualities that he advances to Bahadur Shah's inner circle. Later, Pope Julius III would consider him sufficiently important to mention him in his bull "pracclara charissimi" of December 30, 1551.

== Death ==
Before his death, Zufar had a wakil, a servant, named Bahar Khan Yagut Salmani, an Ottoman slave, who also accompanied him during the Siege of Diu. On June 24, 1546, while supervising the trenches, Zufar's head was taken off by a cannonball fired from the Portuguese in the fort of Diu. One of Zufar's men, Bilal Khairit Khani Habashi, was killed as well. His son, Ramazan Rumi Khan, inherited the title and ruled Surat in 1554.

== Tomb ==
His tomb in Surat was attended to in 1933-34 and restored.

== See also ==
- Gujarati-Portuguese conflicts
