= Square-rigged caravel =

Portuguese sailing ship

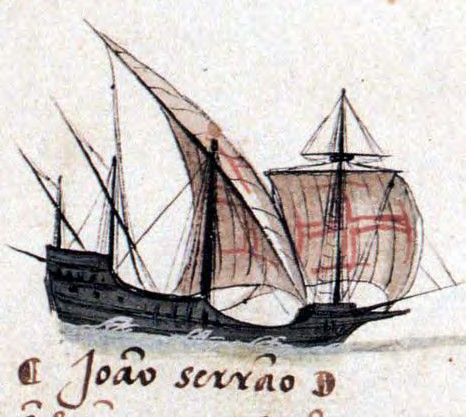
Square-rigged caravel or caravela de armada, of João Serrão (Livro das Armadas) in the 4th Portuguese India Armada (Gama, 1502)

The square-rigged caravel (Portuguese: caravela redonda), was a sailing ship created by the Portuguese in the second half of the fifteenth century. A much larger version of the caravel, its use was most notorious beginning in the end of that century. The square-rigged caravel held a notable role in the Portuguese expansion during the Age of Discovery, especially in the first half of the sixteenth century, for its exceptional maneuverability and combat capabilities. This ship was also sometimes adopted by other European powers. Its hull resembled the shape of the later galleon and some scholars have claimed that this vessel is a forerunner of the fighting galleon, by the name of caravela de armada.

== History ==
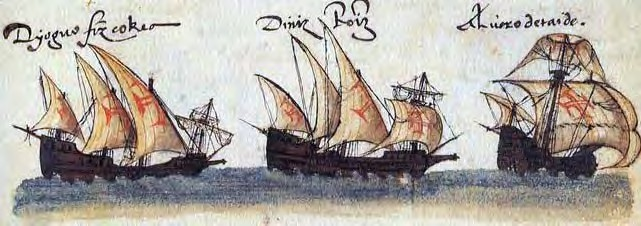
Two square-rigged caravels (detail)

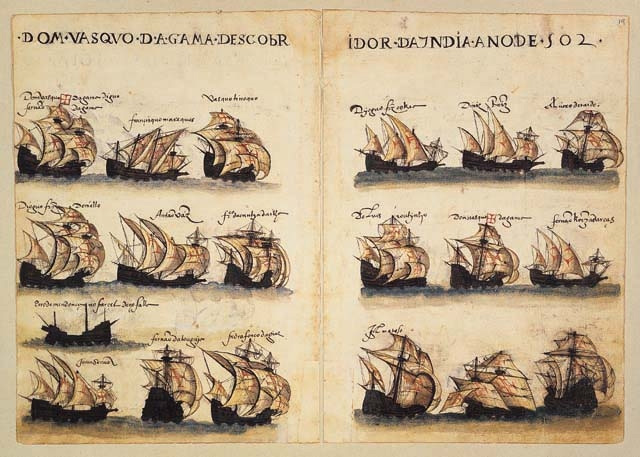
Naus and square-rigged caravels in the 4th Portuguese India Armada of 1502 (Livro de Lisuarte de Abreu)

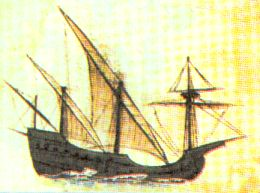
Square-rigged caravel (Caravela Redonda)

The Portuguese square-rigged caravel or round caravel appeared more frequently in the end of the fifteenth century and the beginning of the sixteenth century. Traditionally considered a particular type of caravel but also a new and different type of ship due to its significant structural differences, it was the result of an evolution the design of the caravel which included a structural combination between the carrack and the same caravel. Christopher Columbus, on his voyages to the New World in the service of Castile, used ships also called caravelas redondas (round caravels) by the combination of sails (Possibly in based lateen caravels and other traditional ships models), they were however different from the Portuguese models, which differed by the number and arrangement of the sails and by the hull shape, among other features. There were regulations for the construction of caravels of 150 to 180 tons, 110 to 150 tons, and from 100 to 125 tons. Square-rigged caravels and lateen caravels were different types of ships, being only the generic name caravel the greatest link between both.

The square-rigged caravel possessed aftercastle and forecastle, unlike the lateen caravel, which could not have any structure erected on the bow of the ship, because of the maneuver of the foremast. From this point of view, the square-rigged caravel was closer to the naus and galleons than to its lateen caravel counterpart. She also had a beak apparently quite innovative (for its time) or of "modern" style, projecting forward from the bow below the level of the forecastle, somewhat similar to that commonly used later in galleons of the second half of the 16th century. She had taper and narrow hull lines, checking that the relationship between length and width was between 3:1 and 4:1 (some rare, possibly longer), walking roughly in the middle. This relationship goes close to the patache, ship of some similar characteristics, and was slightly higher than the 3:1 ratio stipulated by the regulations for ships of 150 tons.

If the Portuguese galleon, largely designed for better navigation and for naval defense, would be of more mixed use, warfare and transportation, as would also be the Spanish galleon (among other European ships of this "class" or similar style), the square-rigged caravel or caravela de armada, though partly bifunctional, was essentially dedicated to naval warfare and for the defense of armadas.

The use of these square-rigged caravels for exploration reconnaissance and combat (if necessary), following a larger number of naus in each fleet, were instrumental in the exploration of North America, South America the East, and particularly in the Portuguese India Armadas - including the discovery of Brazil - from the expedition of Pedro Álvares Cabral in 1500 and continuing in the fleets that followed. They were also important, along with naus, in decisive historic battles, as Diu.

The square-rigged caravels had optimal use in coast guard armadas, in the Strait of Gibraltar, Atlantic Islands, North Africa, Mediterranean, Brazil and Indian Ocean. When D. Manuel I decided to send ships to the Azores in order to protect the ships from India, or when he created the Armada do Estreito ("Strait Armada"), he did so with square-rigged caravels armed for naval military action, also some naus, and later on, galleons (in the North Atlantic); and in the Strait of Gibraltar, joining them to the fustas and galleys. Despite the round caravel has been partially replaced by the galleon, its great qualities allowed its use until the end of the seventeenth century. The Portuguese Man o' War was named after this curious type of fighting ship.

== Design ==
Having been a combination of the carrack and the caravel, the square-rigged caravel was distinguished clearly from both ships by its combined sails (absent in the caravel), with four or more masts, usually three with lateen rigged sails and the fore-mast with two square sails, and by its hull design which was narrower and longer. The square-rigged caravel was proportionally narrower in width and longer than the caravel, distinguished also by the sterncastle, more elongated and usually more projected backwards, and more complex, in two floors or two-deck castle-like, on diagonal gradation in length. It was also distinguished from the caravel by the existence of a lower forecastle and by having a snout or head - a long beak, projecting forward from the bow below the level of the forecastle (both absent in the lateen caravel).

The configuration of the square-rigged caravel obeyed to round ships, generally having a more narrow and elongated hull than the vessels of bigger size, more lower lines, aftercastle and forecastle, with two or one floors, and two covers. The ship had four masts, one with two square-rigged sails (the foremast) and lateen sails on the other ones; perfectly adequate morphology tonnage according to the general evolution of sailing vessels since the fifteenth century, which saw firstly a large increase in its superstructures, and came gradually to decrease in volume.

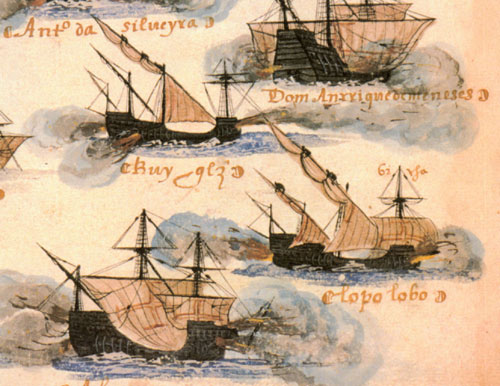
Square-rigged caravels fighting and escorting naus in India Armadas

== Caravela de Armada ==
The "caravela de armada" was, fundamentally, a well-armed square-rigged caravel, created out of the need to carry more cargo and heavier artillery, so as to fulfill military duties such as convoy escort or coastal patrol and integrate the Portuguese Armadas, particularly in the sixteenth century. In order to keep the center of gravity low, so as not to compromise the stability, the draught of the ship was increased, thus enabling the existence of several decks.

== Galleon ==
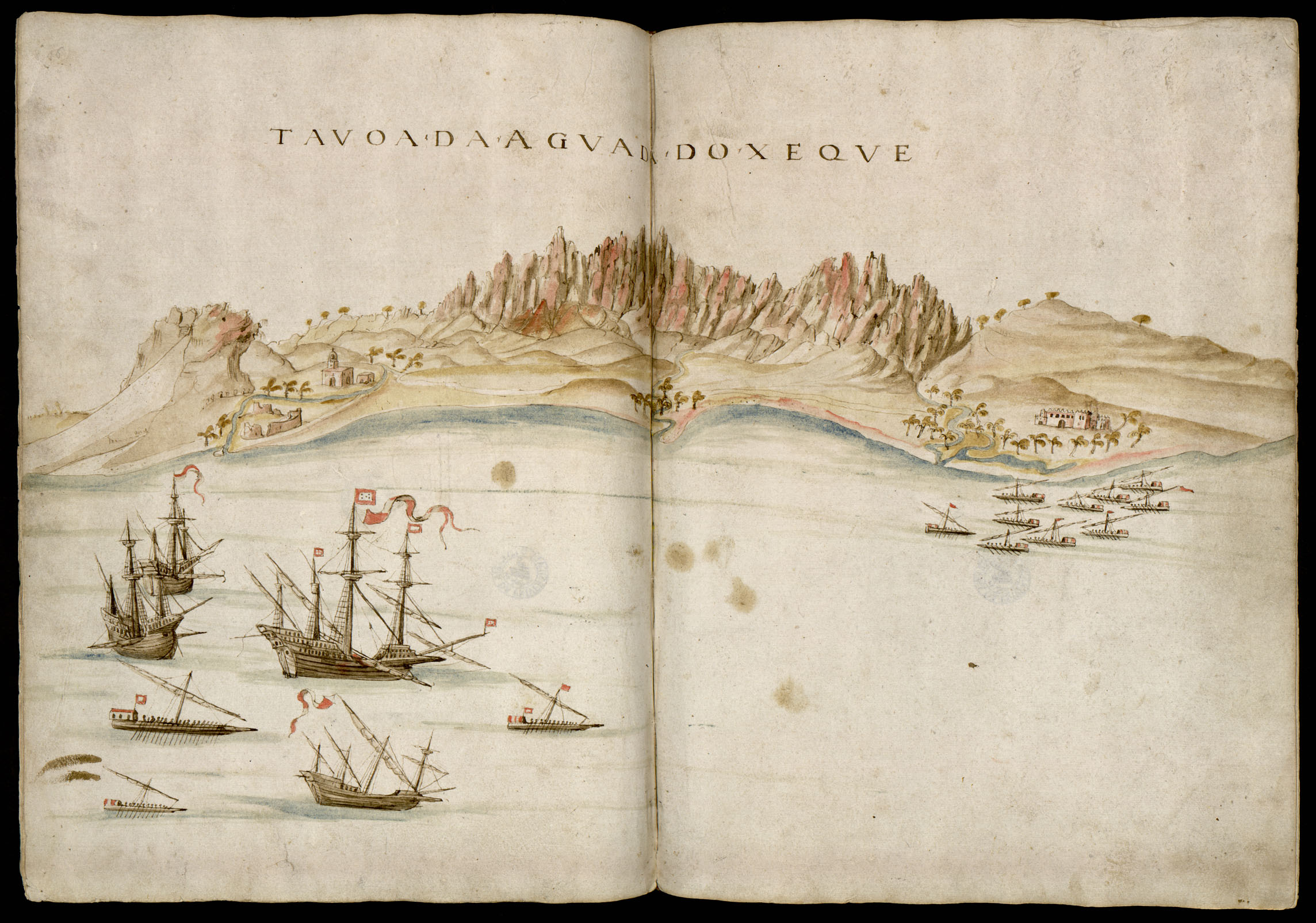
Portuguese naus, galleon, small square-rigged caravel, galiots (fustas) and galleys - Portuguese Armada in Suakin, present day Sudan - 1541, from the Routemap of the Red Sea by João de Castro, during the Portuguese expedition to Suez - Egypt, in 1540–1541.

The Portuguese galleon probably arose during the first quarter of the sixteenth century, contributing to the hegemony of Portugal in the East. It was heavily armed and robust, with less cargo capacity than the carracks used to transport goods, but proved especially suitable to escort fleets and convoys, namely in the India run. This ship was a forerunner and a pioneer in its kind, including in the number and arrangement of its sails, and in its shape as a whole.

In structural terms the galleon may constitute an evolution (in part) of the square-rigged caravel, although wider and heavier. The galleon had a lower and discrete forecastle and a narrower and taper hull than the nau, as the square-rigged caravel, which is substantiated by the higher relation between the length and the bow. Both characteristics, allied to a powerful weaponry and more hydrodynamic lines, made the galleon, in the sixteenth and seventeenth centuries, the Portuguese warship par excellence. Moreover, its hull had a higher density of beacons and stringers, which made the structure more solid and, above all, more resistant to naval artillery.

Initially, the Portuguese galleon had long beaks and spurs, and operated with three masts, the foremast and the main-mast with two square-rigged sails each, and a lateen rigged sail in the mizzen-mast. Result of the natural evolution of new requirements raised by war, soon they were built with four masts; the larger vessels had this configuration, always with lateen rigged sails in the two mizzen-masts in almost all galleons, and a third square smaller sail at the tops of the fore-mast and the main-mast (the latter in larger ships), which can be seen in the galleon São João Baptista, the Botafogo, and on the galleons illustrated in the Roteiro do Mar Roxo of D. João de Castro. The galleon was so, also, a combination of the carrack and the square-rigged caravel in its sails.

Another detail which differs in the galleon is the presence of a beak of appreciable size, extending forward horizontally at the wheel of the bow. This feature, which could already be detected on the square-rigged caravel, appears to be evidence of greater effort required of the bowsprit, which will not be unaware of the fact that both the height of the mast as the sail surface had grown over time.

On the other hand, the more lower and narrower lines, the tapered and pointy shape of the hull, and the beak-shaped prow, allow the navigators to achieve greater speed, while the lower height of the forecastle gave her manoeuver qualities, including greater ability to navigate at a more bushy bowline, with advantage to maneuver on confined spaces. The great firepower of these ships tended to unbalance in their favor the outcome of battles fought at sea, having been used in the Atlantic and Indian Oceans.

== See also ==
- Age of Discovery
- Caravel
- Carrack
- Galleon
- Portuguese India Armadas
- Battle of Diu and Battle of the Gulf of Oman, for examples of square-rigged caravels used in combat.
