= Siege of Diu (1531) =

1531 siege in India

Coordinates: 20.71°N 70.98°E

First siege of Diu
- Part of the Ottoman–Portuguese conflicts and Gujarati–Portuguese conflicts
Date	16 February 1531
Location	Diu, Gujarat Sultanate
Result	Ottoman–Gujarati victory

Belligerents
Ottoman Empire; Gujarat Sultanate	Portuguese Empire

Commanders and leaders
Khoja Zufar; Mustafa Bayram	Nuno da Cunha

Strength
10,000–12,000 men 2 galleons 70 oarships of various sizes several basilisks	About 400 vessels: 14 galleons; 6 naus; 2 war caravels; 5 large supply junks; 2 galleasses; 12 galleys; 16 half-galleys; 228 light-galleys; 115 small craft and merchantships; 30,000 men, including: 3,560 Portuguese soldiers; 2,000 Malabarese auxiliaries; 8,000 combat slaves; 3,000 slave gunners; 1,450 Portuguese sailors; 4,000 Malabarese sailors or rowers; 800 junk ship crew

Casualties and losses
800	31 dead 120 wounded

The siege of Diu occurred when a combined Ottoman-Gujarati force defeated a Portuguese attempt to capture the city of Diu in 1531. The victory was partly the result of Ottoman firepower over the Portuguese besiegers deployed by Mustafa Bayram, an Ottoman expert.

Shortly before the siege the Portuguese encountered roughly 800 enemy soldiers at Siyâl Bet island^{[a]}, engaged them in combat, and killed them all. There were 9 or 17 Portuguese killed and 120 wounded. They then sailed for Diu, but the Muslim alliance defeated them and killed 14.

Although Diu was successfully defended, victory was short-lived: Diu was blockaded and the Portuguese armada was diverted towards more exposed Gujarati cities. Ghogha, Surat, Mangrol, Somnath, Bassein, Tarapur, Kelva, Mahim, Bulsar, Agashi, Patam, Pate, and many smaller settlements were assaulted and sacked, some never recovering from the attacks.

In 1534, Sultan Bahadur of Gujarat signed a peace treaty with Governor Nuno da Cunha, granting the Portuguese the territory of Bassein, including Bombay. In 1535, the Portuguese were allowed to construct a fortress at Diu.

== See also ==
- Siege of Diu (1538)
- Siege of Diu (1546)

== Notes ==
- ^[a] Gujarati name for jackal island, one of three islands near Diu, João de Barros calls it Ilha de Bet.
