= Gujarati–Portuguese conflicts =

1508–1573 engagements in India

- Part of Portuguese presence in Asia
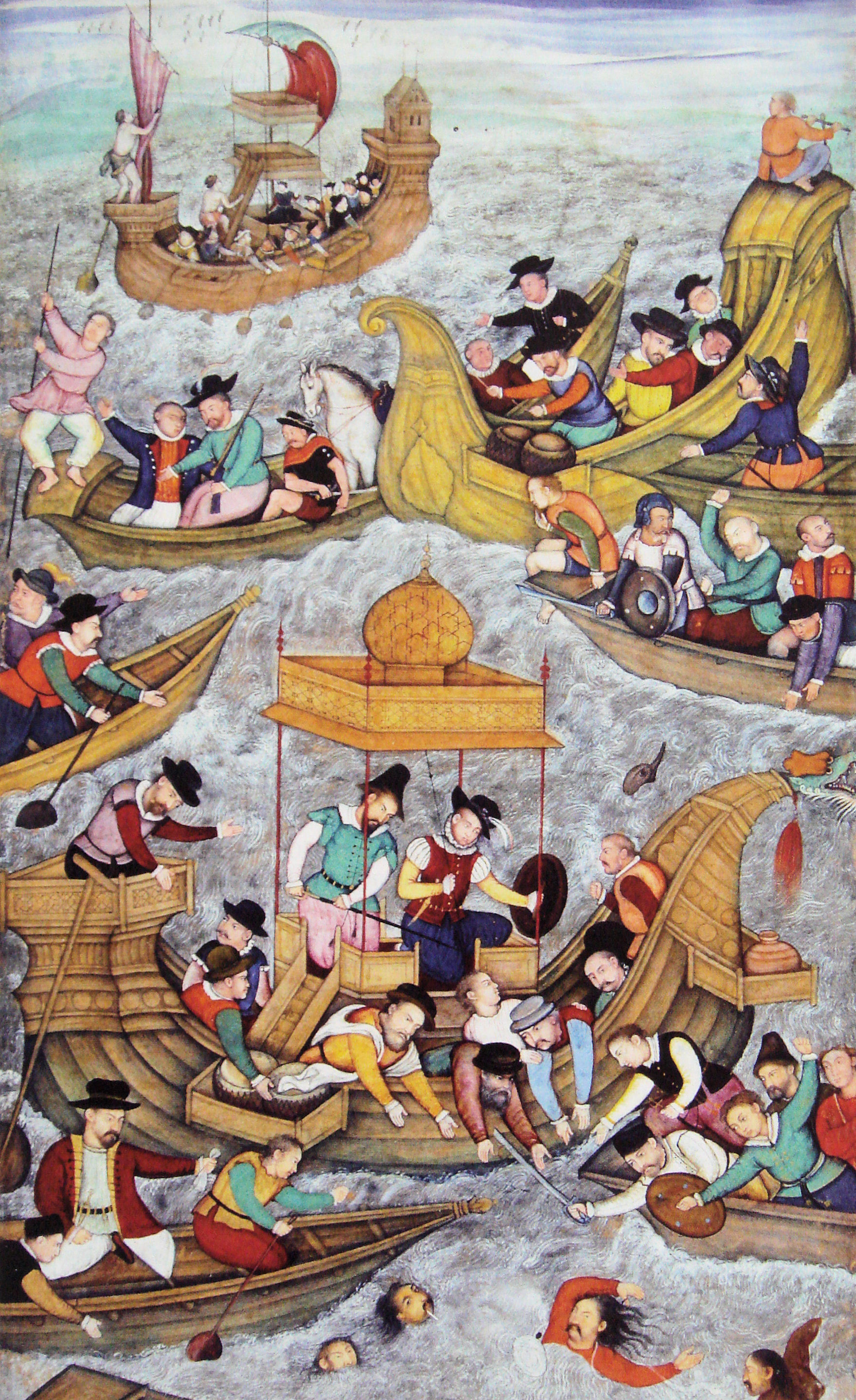
- Mughal miniature depicting the death of Sultan Bahadur of Gujarat in Diu.
Date	1508–1573 (65 years)
Location	Gujarat, India
Result	Establishment of Portuguese Diu; Treaty of Bassein (1534); Establishment of Portuguese Bassein; Establishment of Portuguese Daman; Consolidation of Portuguese control in the Gulf of Khambhat.; Start of Mughal-Portuguese conflicts.

Belligerents
Portuguese Empire; Supported by: Sultanate of Ahmadnagar	Sultanate of Gujarat; Supported by: Mamluk Sultanate; Kingdom of Calicut; Ottoman Empire

Commanders and leaders
Dom Lourenço de Almeida †; Dom Francisco de Almeida; Dom Aleixo de Meneses; Nuno da Cunha; António da Silveira; Heitor da Silveira †; Diogo da Silveira; Dom João de Mascarenhas; Dom João de Castro; Jorge de Meneses Baroche; Dom Constantino de Bragança	Malik Ayyaz; Mustafa Bayram; Bahadur Shah of Gujarat X; Khoja Zufar †; Mahmud Shah III of Gujarat; Cid Bofetá; Malik Tokan; Malik Issack; (Ottoman Empire) Suleiman Pasha

Gujarati–Portuguese conflicts refers to the armed engagements between the Portuguese Empire and the Sultanate of Gujarat, in India, that took place from 1508 until Gujarat was annexed by the Mughal Empire in 1573.

== Context ==
When Vasco da Gama made landfall in India in 1498, the Sultanate of Gujarat was one of the main commercial and maritime powers of India and the Indian Ocean. The region marketed various textiles, indigo, sugar and other commodities which were in high demand in Asia and Europe. The geography of central and southern Gujarat was particularly well suited for the production of valuable cash-crops like cotton and indigo.

A large number of Gujarati merchants lived in East Africa in Malindi but also in Mombasa which was hostile to the Portuguese. It was the influence of powerful Gujarati merchant elites that caused sultan Mahmud Shah of Malacca in the Malay peninsula to turn on the Portuguese when they reached that city in 1509. Malacca was the chief center of Gujarati trade overseas, 1000 merchants settled there in the fifteenth century and about 4000 to 5000 visited the city yearly to trade. They were compared to Venetians and Genoese for their skill in trade and navigation.

The Portuguese diplomat and apothecary Tomé Pires commented that:

Cambay chiefly stretches out two arms, with her right arm she reaches towards Aden and with the other towards Malacca.

Portugal sought to participate in the Indian Ocean trade and was first brought into conflict with Gujarat when the Gujarati governor of Diu Malik Ayyaz joined a Mamluk-Calicut-Venetian coalition to drive the Portuguese out of India in 1508.

== Early engagements ==
=== Battle of Chaul, 1508 ===
The Battle of Chaul was a naval battle between a Portuguese fleet commanded by Dom Lourenço de Almeida and an Egyptian Mamluk fleet allied to a Gujarati fleet in 1508 in the harbour of Chaul in India. The battle ended in a Muslim victory. This was the first Portuguese defeat at sea in the Indian Ocean.

=== Battle of Diu, 1509 ===
After the Battle of Chaul in 1508, an allied Mamluk-Gujarati-Calicut force had assembled a fleet in Diu to drive the Portuguese out of India. They were confronted by a Portuguese fleet under the command of the viceroy of India Dom Francisco de Almeida.

Portuguese victory was critical: the great Muslim alliance was soundly defeated, easing the Portuguese strategy of controlling the Indian Ocean to route trade down the Cape of Good Hope, circumventing the historical spice trade controlled by the Arabs and the Venetians through the Red Sea and Persian Gulf. After the battle, the Kingdom of Portugal rapidly captured several key ports in the Indian Ocean including Goa, Colombo, Malacca and Ormuz. Losses crippled the Mamluk Sultanate and the Gujarat Sultanate.

The Battle of Diu was a battle of annihilation similar to the Battle of Lepanto and the Battle of Trafalgar, and one of the most important in world naval history, for it marks the beginning of European dominance over Asian seas that would last until the Second World War.

=== Battles of Chaul and Dabul, 1517 ===
In 1517, a Portuguese fleet of 7 oarships under the command of João de Monroi defeated a fleet of 15 Gujarati oarships from Diu near Chaul, contracted by the lord of Mahim to attack Portuguese shipping. Later that same year, Monroi defeated another fleet of 14 oarships near Dabul thanks to superior artillery.

== Luso-Gujarati War, 1521-1534 ==
=== Battle of Chaul 1521 ===
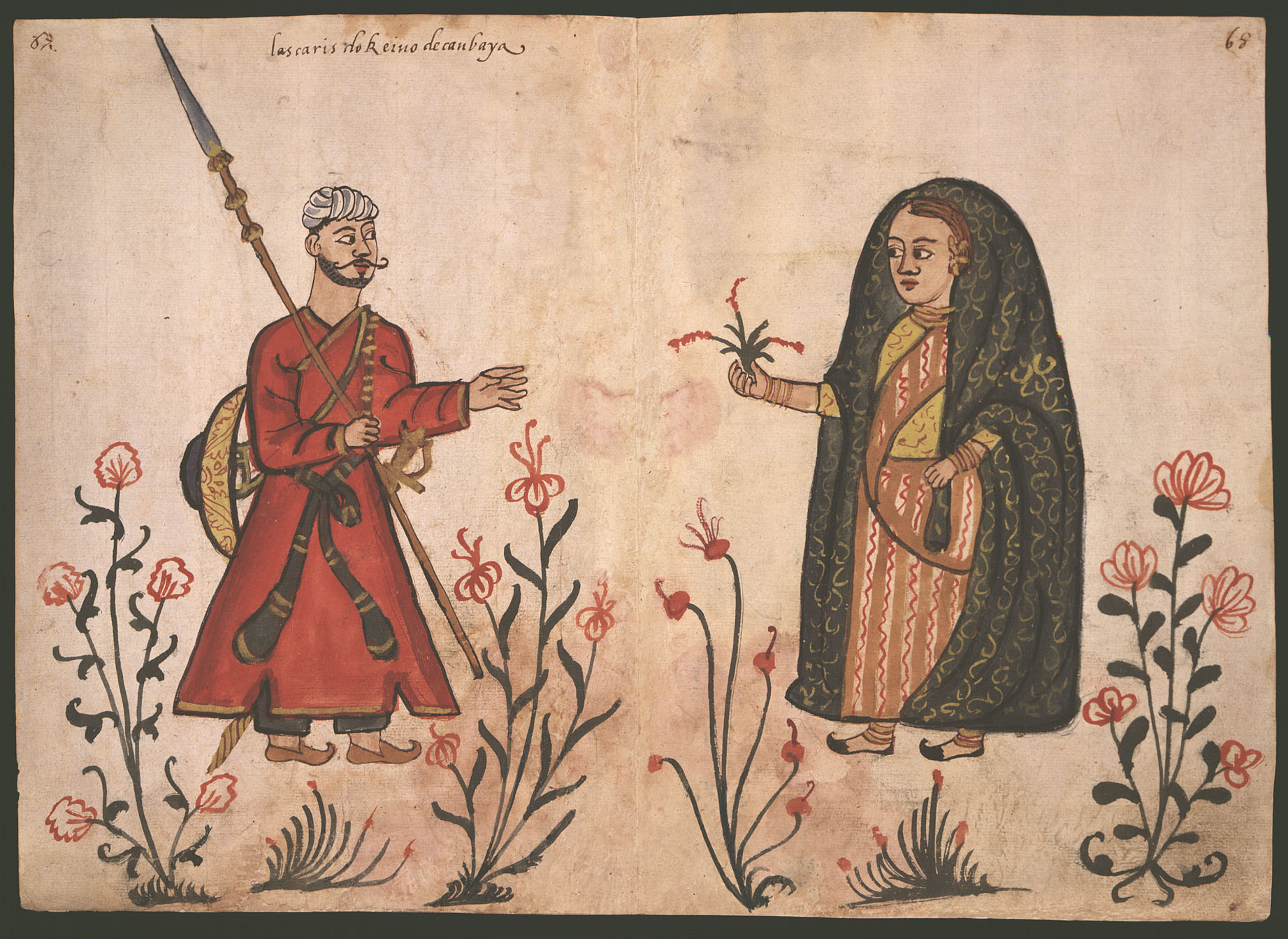
Portuguese watercolour sketch of a Gujarati warrior.

When the Portuguese began construction of a fortress in Chaul with the consent of the Nizam Shah of Ahmadnagar, the governor of Diu Malik Issack dispatched 40-50 oarships under the leadership of Aga Mohammed to prevent its construction. The Portuguese governor of India Diogo Lopes de Sequeira mobilized three galleons, a caravel and three galleys under the command of Dom Aleixo de Meneses and after a long-drawn combat of artillery in November 1521, Aga Mohammed retreated in disgrace.

=== Gujarat campaign, 1529 ===
In 1529, the governor of India Lopo Vaz de Sampaio assembled a fleet to take Diu, however after departing from Chaul the Portuguese anchored by a small island within the Bombay harbour due to contrary winds. The great captain Alixa or Ali Shah was to be found nearby with a fleet of 68 oarvessels but he promptly sailed away. Ali Shah was defeated within the Nagothana river by a detachment commanded by Heitor da Silveira. Ali Shah withdrew to a well defended fortress on land but Silveira landed with 500 men and laid waste to the surrounding region, thereafter returning with captured artillery.

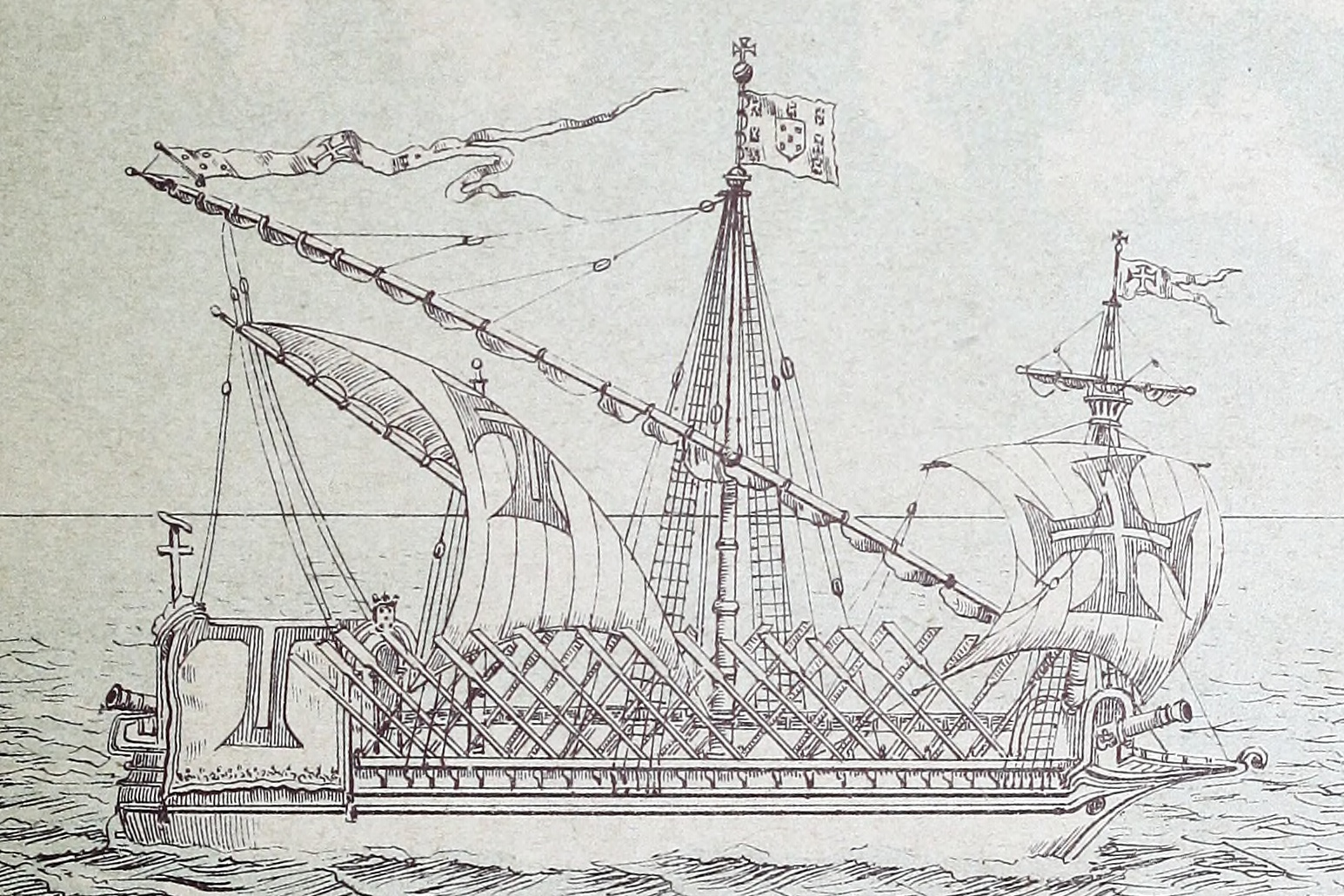
Portuguese galley in India.

Sampaio withdrew to Goa on March 20 but left Heitor da Silveira behind with a 22 oarships and 300 men. Silveira made repeated incursions into the island of Bombay and probably the other islands as well. Silveira and his men gave the island of Bombay the name Ilha da Boa Vida or "Island of Good Life". Ali Shah was to be found heavily fortified at Bassein with 3,500 men, however the fortification was stormed and the city of Bassein plundered and torched. Fearing for his safety and that of his city, the lord of Thana offered 2000 pardaos as tribute, which was accepted.

=== Gujarat campaign, 1530 ===
In 1530, a Portuguese naval squadron commanded by António da Silveira destroyed Surat and Rander, despite fierce resistance from its warlike Muslim population. Surat would later be rebuilt and take the place of its rival.

=== Gujarat campaign, 1531 ===
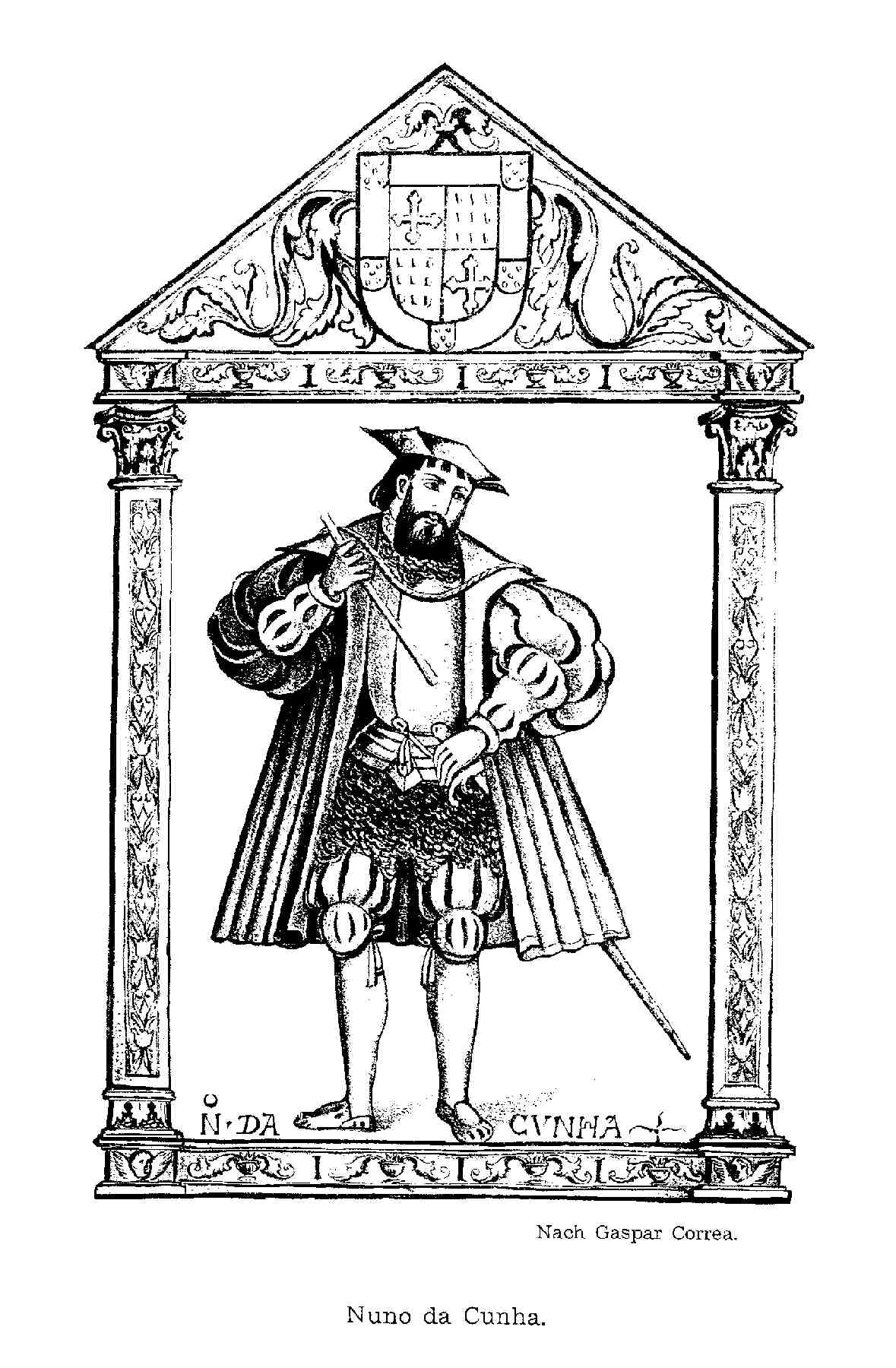
The Portuguese governor of India Nuno da Cunha, sketched by Gaspar Correia.

In 1531, the Portuguese governor of India Nuno da Cunha assembled a large armada of up to 400 ships and 30,000 men to capture the island of Diu.

They engaged roughly 800 enemy soldiers at Siyâl Bet island and killed them all. The Portuguese suffered 9 or 17 killed and 120 wounded. They then sailed for Diu, but the Muslim alliance defeated them and killed 14. The victory was partly the result of Ottoman firepower over the Portuguese deployed by Mustafa Bayram, an Ottoman expert.

Although Diu was successfully defended, victory was short-lived: Diu was blockaded and the Portuguese armada was diverted towards more exposed Gujarati cities. Ghogha, Surat, Mangrol, Somnath, Bassein, Tarapur, Kelva, Mahim, Bulsar, Agashi, Patam, Pate, and many other settlements were assaulted and sacked, some never recovering from the attacks.

=== Gujarat campaign, 1532 ===
Governor Nuno da Cunha dispatched Diogo da Silveira to attack Gujarat, however Silveira found little to do upon arriving on account of the coastal regions having become heavily depopulated. The lord of Thana was asked to pay the tribute agreed the year before, however by the instigation of the lord of Diu Malik Tokan this was refused. Thana was then sacked. Silveira proceeded to Chaul on April 1532.

=== Gujarat campaign, 1533 ===
The governor Nuno da Cunha intended to blockade Diu and cut it off from any supplies but as he calculated that Bassein might interfere with this plan, he set out against this city in late 1532 with 150 sail and 3,000 Portuguese soldiers plus 200 Kanarese auxiliaries. In January 1533 the Portuguese reached Bassein, which was strongly fortified and defended by 12,000 men. Cunha divided his men in three squadrons and attacked the city from three angles. The Gujaratis were discouraged at the first attack and withdrew to the fort, from which they were driven out, having lost 600 dead. The Portuguese captured 400 pieces of artillery with a large supply of ammunition and after having ravaged the surrounding countryside they razed the fort.

Manuel de Albuquerque was then sent to attack Daman. Albuquerque was successful and not only attacked Daman but burnt all the towns from Bassein to Tarapur and returned with considerable spoils and captured vessels after bringing Thana, Bandora, Mahim and Bombay under tribute.

=== Gujarat campaign, 1534 ===
Portuguese naval and war banner featuring the Cross of the Order of Christ.

Two Portuguese fleets reached India in 1534, one consisting of 5 ships commanded by Martim Afonso de Sousa and another of 12 ships and 1200 soldiers commanded by Dom Pedro de Castelo Branco. Martim Afonso de Sousa was entrusted with 500 men on 40 ships and attacked Daman. Its commander destroyed the town and retreated into the fort, but it was taken soon after by the Portuguese, most of its defenders slain and the fort razed. In 1534, Sultan Bahadur of Gujarat signed a peace treaty with Governor Nuno da Cunha, granting the Portuguese the territory of Bassein, including Bombay. In 1535, the Portuguese were allowed to construct a fortress at Diu.

== Luso-Gujarati War 1537-1539 ==
The Sultan of Gujarat Bahadur Shah was under threat from the Mughal emperor Humayun and granted Diu to the Portuguese in exchange not just for assistance against the Mughals but also protection should his realm fall. The Portuguese seized the stronghold of Gogala (Bender-i Türk) near the city, and built the Diu Fort.

Once the threat from Humayun was removed, Bahadur tried to negotiate the withdrawal of the Portuguese but on 13 February 1537 he drowned during the negotiations in unclear circumstances, both sides blaming the other for the tragedy.

After the death of Bahadur, the Portuguese attempted to interfere deeply in the politics of Gujarat by installing a puppet sultan on its throne, Muhammad Zaman Mirza, who accepted a treaty dictated by the Portuguese and granted them large sums of money. He was however, deposed shortly afterwards by the supporters of Mahmud III.

=== Siege of Diu, 1538 ===
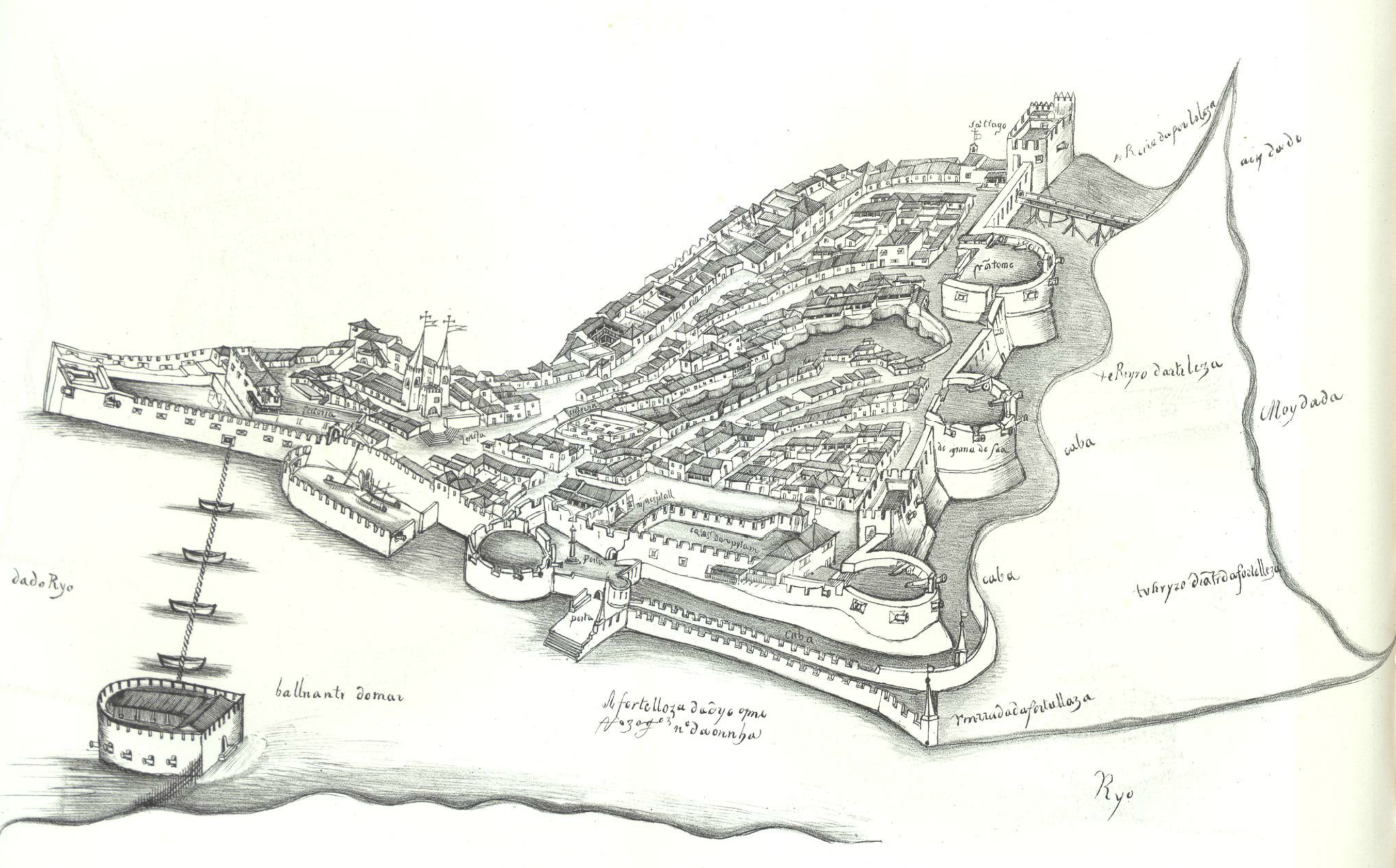
16th century sketch of the Portuguese fortress of Diu sketched by Gaspar Correia.

Bahadur Shah had appealed to the Ottomans to expel the Portuguese, which led to the 1538 expedition. An army of the Sultanate of Gujarat under Khoja Zufar aided by an Ottoman fleet led by the Ottoman governor of Egypt Hadım Suleiman Pasha, attempted to capture Diu in 1538 but the Portuguese under the command of captain António da Silveira resisted the four months long siege.

=== Siege of Bassein, 1538 ===
While Diu was besieged, Gujarat sieged Bassein. The commander of Bassein Ruy Lourenço de Távora dispatched a distress call to the governor, who sent him a galleon and four barques with 400 soldiers in reinforcements under the command of Tristão de Ataíde. Upon arriving, the Portuguese attacked the Gujarati army and forced them to withdraw to a neighbouring island, where they were surrounded and destroyed. Upon being known of the defeat at Diu, the Gujaratis discontinued their attacks against the Portuguese.

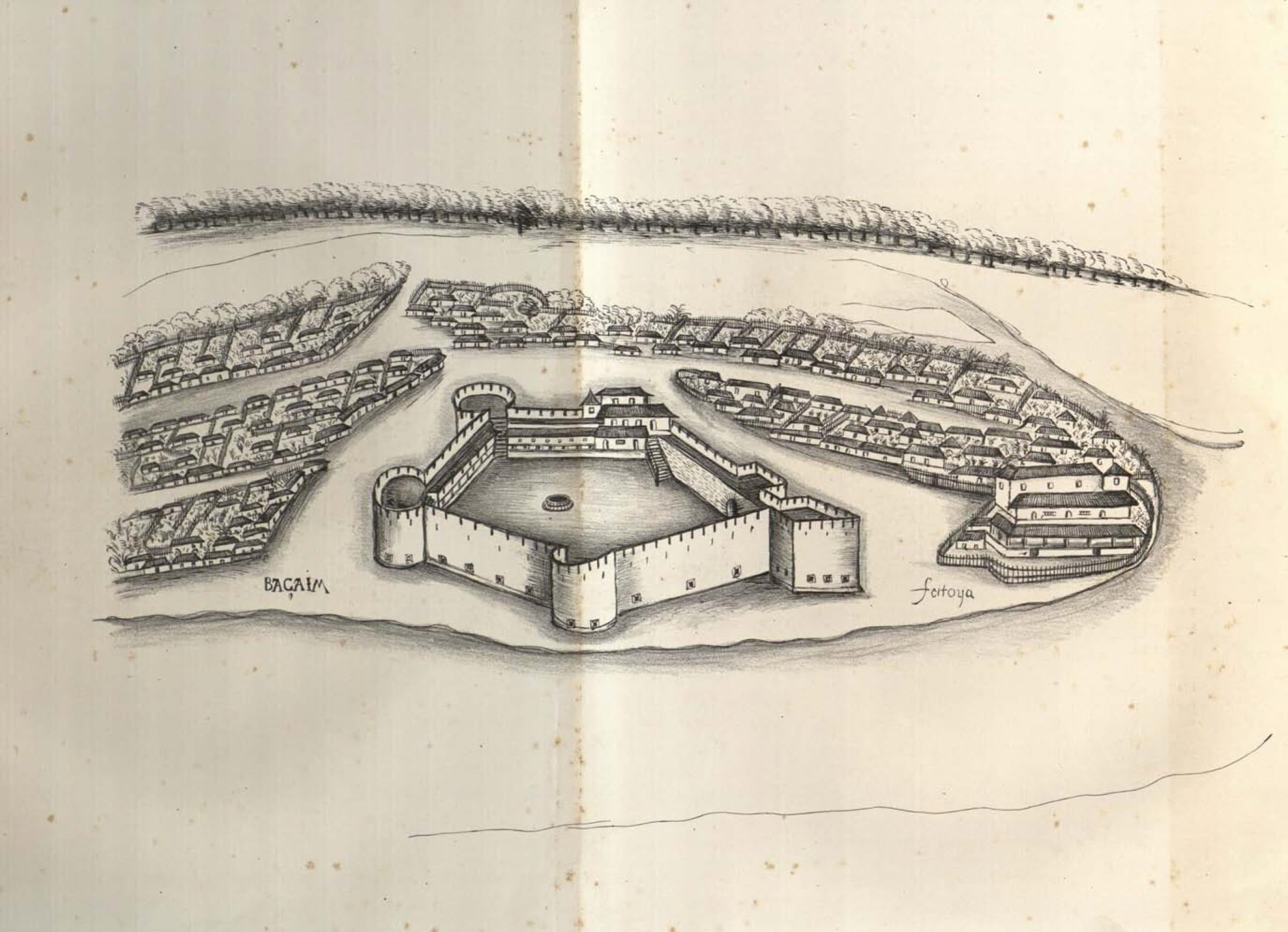
16th century Portuguese sketch of Bassein by Gaspar Correia.

In February 26, 1539, the new Portuguese governor of India Dom Garcia de Noronha signed a peace treaty with Coja Sofar as mediator, and among other things it stipulated that two other forts which the Portuguese had built on the island of Diu and been destroyed throughout the course of the siege would not be reconstructed and partitioned a number of revenues between the Sultan of Gujarat and the Portuguese.

== Luso-Gujarati War 1546-1549 ==
The partition of customs revenues between Portugal and Gujarat at Diu was the cause of considerable disputes and tensions between both parties. Furthermore, the lord of Surat Khoja Zufar competed with the Portuguese and often tried to evade Portuguese control of the seas, sending out heavily armed merchantships without a trading license or cartaz. He posed as champion of Gujarats merchants, for his own wealth was dependendant on their trade, rather than land.

=== Siege of Diu, 1546 ===
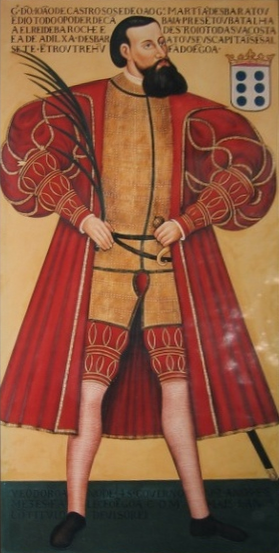
The Portuguese governor of India Dom João de Castro.

After the failed siege of 1538, the Gujarati general Khoja Zufar besieged Diu again in an attempt to recapture the island. The siege lasted seven months from 20 April 1546 to 10 November 1546.

The siege ended when a Portuguese fleet under Governor João de Castro arrived and routed the attackers. Khoja Zufar and his son Muharram Rumi Khan were both killed during the siege.

Peace proposals in December 1546 were turned down and the governor Dom João de Castro ordered attacks across all of Gujarats coast. Gogha, Surat, Rander and Daman were once more attacked by Portuguese squadrons.

=== Sack of Bharuch 1547 ===
After Diu was sieged for the second time by the Sultanate of Gujarat, the Portuguese governor of India dispatched Jorge de Meneses with a force of 10 oarships and 600 men to blockade the coast of Gujarat and capture any ship carrying supplies. Having acquired information from fishermen of two captured vessels that nearby Bharuch was poorly protected, he conducted a daring night-time raid against the city, successfully assaulting it and sacking it. Meneses and his men afterwards attacked the neighbouring towns and coastal populations. In the aftermath, Jorge de Meneses added Baroche to his name in remembrance of the exploit.

Due to the cessation of naval trade with Gujarat on account of the war, the governor of India faced considerable opposition in Goa. The Raja of Cannanore, the citizens of Goa and the prominent fidalgo Dom Francisco de Lima urged the governor to make peace. It was signed on January 1549.

== Later conflicts ==
Fearing for another joint Ottoman-Gujarati attack on Diu, in 1554 the Portuguese annexed the entirety of the Island of Diu and the following year seized control of the customs. In 1556, the Portuguese seized the great hill fort of Asheri and the important station of Manor on the Vaitarna River.

=== Portuguese conquest of Daman, 1559 ===
Daman was captured by the Portuguese governor of India Dom Constantino de Bragança in order to reinforce the security of Bassein. Furthermore, a fleet operating between Daman and Diu would be much more effective at safeguarding the Gulf of Cambay than between Bassein and Diu. The lord of Daman whom the Portuguese identified as Cid Bofetá had mobilized 4000 men to defend his territory, however he abandoned the city and retreated further inland upon the arrival of the Portuguese armada, numbering about 100 ships and 3000 soldiers. Cid Bofetá was then routed by António Moniz Barreto, who attacked his camp in a night-time raid with 500 men, while Dom Pedro de Almeida later captured nearby Valsad with 150 horse and 150 foot.

== Aftermath ==
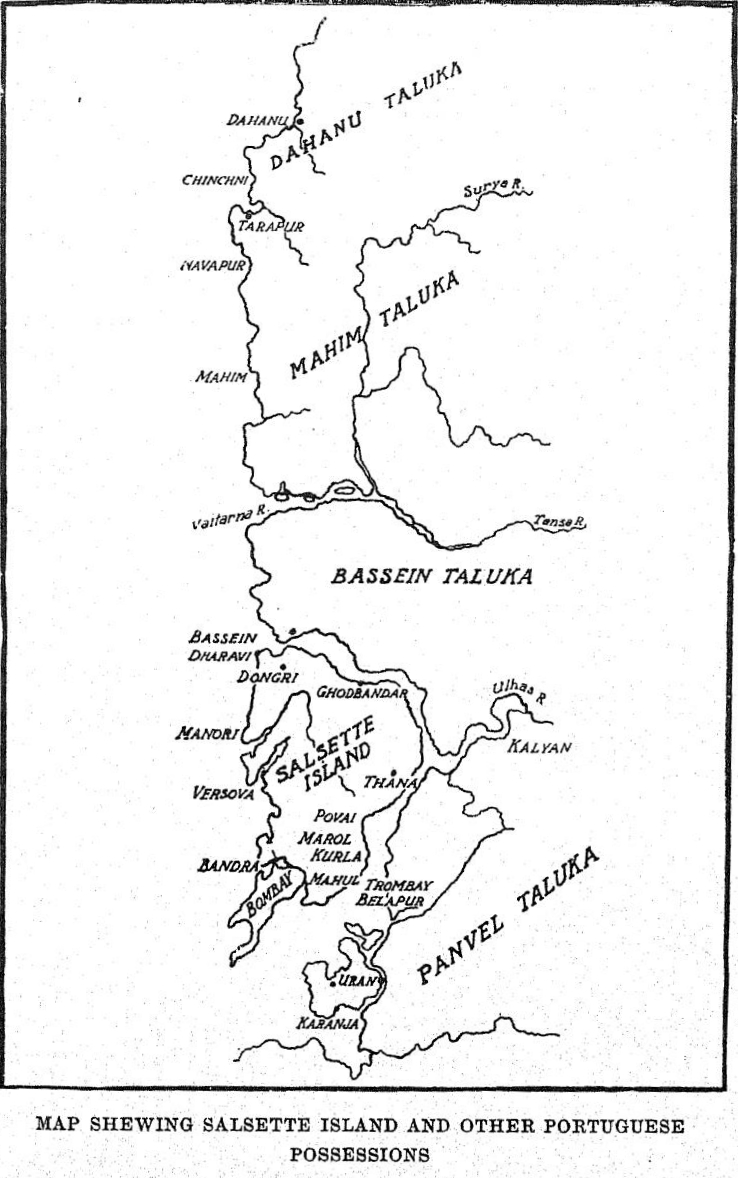
Portuguese territory in Gujarat.

After the acquisition of Bassein in 1534 and Diu in 1535, Portuguese grip on navigation in the Gulf of Khambat became even tighter with the capture of Daman, making it increasingly difficult for merchant ships to travel without a cartaz, and the invicibility of Portuguese fleets ultimately caused the Gujaratis to accept the system. Control of the Gulf by the Portuguese navy was therefore complete.

Bahadur Shahs successors struggled with civil-war, until eventually Gujarat was annexed by the Mughals in 1573.

Daman and Diu would remain in Portuguese possession for 402 years, until 1961.

== See also ==
- Military history of Portugal
- Portuguese India
- Adil Shahi–Portuguese conflicts
- Mamluk-Portuguese conflicts
- Ottoman-Portuguese conflicts (1538-1560)
- Acehnese-Portuguese conflicts
- Sinhalese-Portuguese conflicts
- Malay-Portuguese conflicts
- Fort São Jerónimo
- Fort of Daman
- Mughal–Portuguese conflicts
