= Selman Reis =

Ottoman admiral in the Mamluk Navy of Egypt

Selman Reis was an Ottoman admiral and former corsair who was active in the Mamluk Navy of Egypt and later in the Ottoman Navy against the Portuguese in the first half of the 16th century. Selman Reis was originally from the Aegean island of Lesbos.

== Mercenary for the Mamluk regime ==
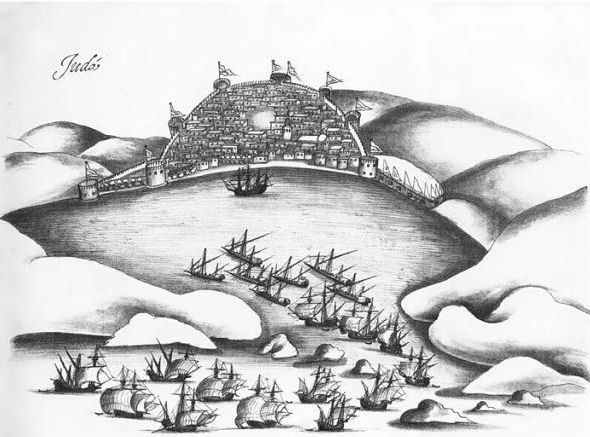
Selman Reis defended Jiddah against a Portuguese attack in 1517.

Selman Reis entered the service of the Mamluks, and led a group of 2,000 Levantines, against the wishes of the Ottoman Sultan Selim I.

Following the disruption of the spice trade between India and Mamluk Egypt by the Portuguese, Selman Reis led a Mamluk fleet of 19 ships into the Indian Ocean in 1515. He left Suez leading the fleet on 30 September 1515. The fleet also included 3,000 men, 1,300 of whom were Turkish soldiers. The fleet built a fortress in Kamaran, but failed to take Yemen and Aden on 17 September 1516.

In 1517, he defended Jeddah against a Portuguese attack, soon before the fall of the Mamluk regime.

Selman Reis was sent to Istanbul and imprisoned for disloyalty until 1520.

== Ottoman admiral ==
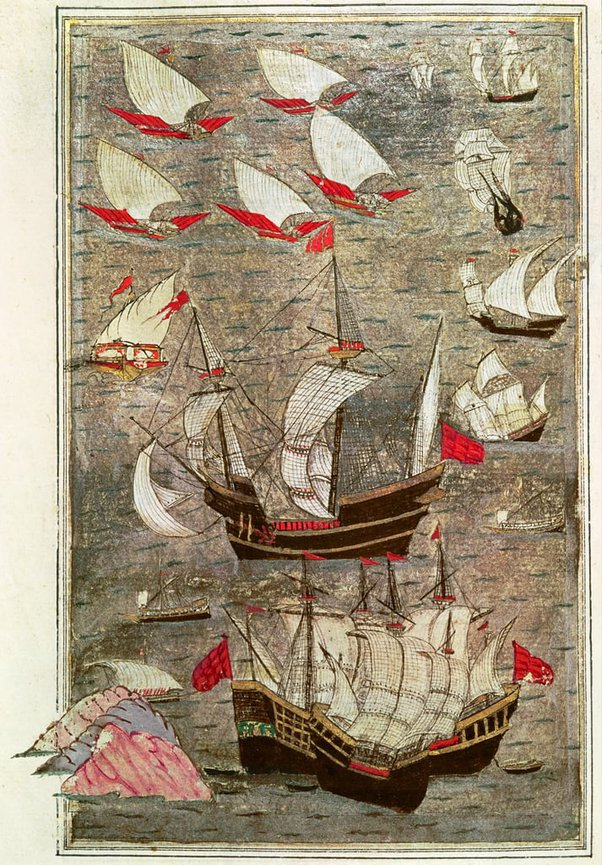
Ottoman fleet in the Indian Ocean in the 16th century.

Shortly after Selman was freed, he returned to Egypt in the same year and stayed there for three years until when Ahmed Pasha, the Ottoman governor of Egypt Eyalet revolted, Selman escaped from Egypt and headed to Mecca and joined with Husayn al-Rumi, the governor of Jeddah and together they proceeded to capture Yemen. During this time, they discovered that the Portuguese recently established themselves in Kamaran island where they raided the coast of Yemen and kidnapped the inhabitants. Selman defeated the Portuguese, captured the island and took parts of the garrison as captives. However, he ran afoul of the ruler of Zebid and had to flee back to Egypt.

Selman Reis came back in favor with the arrival of Ibrahim Pasha in Egypt in 1524. He was able to make a detailed report of the situation of the Indian Ocean at the time, suggesting the occupation of Ethiopia, Yemen, and the Swahili Coast, and the eviction of the Portuguese from Hormuz, Goa and Malacca. In 1525, the Portuguese raided the Red Sea, further bringing the threat of their fleet closer to Egypt.

In 1525, Selman Reis was put at the head of an Ottoman fleet of 18 ships and 299 cannons as its admiral, with ships taken from the derelict Jiddah fleet and refurbished in Suez. He was in association with Hayreddin, leading around 4,000 infantry. They left Suez in 1526 and returned Jiddah to order. Landing in Mokha in January 1527, they led an expedition into the interior of Yemen to subdue the area, which they succeeding in doing after beheading Mustafa Beg. Aden remained independent but recognized suzerainty to Ottoman rule.

This allowed the Ottomans to retake control of the Red Sea, and for the first time, the Portuguese could not send a fleet to the Red Sea in 1527. Following these successes, various potentates in the Indian Ocean asked for Ottoman help against the Portuguese: in 1527 the Vizier of Hormuz as well as the Zamorin of Calicut.

By 1528, Ottoman mercenaries were present on Islamic shipping as far as Sumatra. However, Selman Reis fell into a dispute with Hayreddin who had Selman assassinated in September 1528. Selman's nephew Mustafa Bayram tried to avenge his death by having Hayreddin killed although he failed to do so, but in the wake of Selman's and Hayreddin's deaths the Ottomans lost control of mainland Yemen and their naval power gradually began to diminish in that region.
