= Battle of annihilation =

Military strategy seeking total destruction of an enemy's military capacity

Annihilation is a military strategy in which an attacking army seeks to entirely destroy the military capacity of the opposing army. This strategy can be executed in a single planned pivotal battle, called a "battle of annihilation". A successful battle of annihilation is accomplished through the use of tactical surprise, application of overwhelming force at a key point, or other tactics performed immediately before or during the battle.

The end goal of a battle of annihilation is to cause the leaders of the opposing army to sue for peace due to the complete annihilation of their army and thus inability to further engage in offensive or defensive military action. It is not necessary to kill or capture all, or even most, of an opposing army's forces to annihilate it in the sense used here. Rather, the destruction of the enemy army as a cohesive military force able to offer further meaningful military offense or defense, even if temporarily, is the objective.

== Significance ==
In ancient and classical warfare, many battles ended with the annihilation of one of the opposing forces, the Battles of Cannae, Zama and Adrianople being famous examples. From the Renaissance onward, however, the battle of annihilation strategy fell into disuse, at least in Europe. The greatest exception is seen in the battles of Napoleon Bonaparte, with whom the battle of annihilation in the modern sense is most closely associated, and the term "Napoleonic battle of annihilation" is sometimes used. The Battle of Austerlitz (1805) is often cited as the paragon of the modern battle of annihilation. The 18th-century commander Alexander Suvorov destroyed an entire 40,000-strong garrison by storming Izmail Fortress (1790) without conducting a proper siege.

Napoleon's victories at Austerlitz (1805) and Jena (1806) are often cited as the classic battles of annihilation. Napoleon himself was unable to again achieve such decisive results in tactical and, at the same time, political terms – with the possible exception of the Battle of Friedland (1807) – partly because his enemies adjusted to his tactics. For example, the Battle of Wagram was a hard-won victory, while the Battle of Borodino was a tactical victory but did not result in the desired destruction of the Russian army. In 1813–1814, however, when in both cases Napoleon was outnumbered almost two to one, he thrashed the allies in the Battle of Dresden and succeeded in dispersing an enemy army during the Six Days' Campaign, consisting of four separate small battles.

== After Napoleon ==
Nevertheless, strategists, influenced by those of the Napoleonic era, most notably Antoine-Henri Jomini, held the Napoleonic battle of annihilation to be the proper objective of modern military campaigns. That interpretation was later accredited to the more renowned Carl von Clausewitz, initially by Helmuth von Moltke the Elder, who supported arguments for strategies of annihilation with quotes from Clausewitz. However, Clausewitz disliked Jomini personally and his concepts and may have instead emphasized the primacy of the political in warfare, and remained indifferent to theories arguing for any absolute solutions via the application of military force. Nevertheless, that set the stage for mass confusion down the line of strategic thinkers. Clausewitz's trilogies (albeit used out of context) are contested by Liddell Hart, who claims in Strategy that a poor choice of words by Clausewitz led his interpreters to overestimate the value of battles of annihilation. Consequently, at the beginning of the American Civil War, many top military commanders mistakenly expected that a battle of annihilation would quickly end the war. However, the size and firepower of armies were making the battle of annihilation more difficult to achieve.

A contrast may be seen between Confederate General Robert E. Lee and Union General Ulysses S. Grant. Lee, when on the offensive, usually maneuvered with the intent of forcing a battle of annihilation. His archetypal attempt was at the Battle of Chancellorsville in which a classic Napoleonic flanking maneuver defeated but was not able to destroy the Union Army under Joseph Hooker. Lee may be faulted for attempting to achieve a battle of annihilation, particularly at the Battle of Gettysburg. In contrast, Grant was noted for waging campaigns of maneuver. During the Battle of Vicksburg, he forced John C. Pemberton's army into a siege position in which it was forced to surrender without a battle. In the Virginia campaign of 1864 against Lee, he continually maneuvered around Lee and forced him to withdraw further and further south until he had to choose between abandoning the Confederate capital, Richmond, or withdrawing into siege lines. William Tecumseh Sherman may also be cited. Rather than pursuing the chimera of destroying John Bell Hood's army, Sherman chose to operate directly against the Confederate economy. His famous march through Georgia, directly away from Hood, was basically the opposite of a Napoleonic strategy.

During the Franco-Prussian War, the Prussians (and later the Germans) made their own version of the battle of annihilation by destroying entire armies relatively quickly by means of rapid troop movement and rapid encirclement of the enemy. Those tactics came into fruition during the decisive battles of Metz and Sedan in which two main French armies were completely annihilated at the same time and relatively quickly, rendering France almost completely defenseless against the German invasion.

The Napoleonic ideal was still alive at the beginning of World War I. In fact, the Germans were able to execute a battle of annihilation against the Russian 2nd Army at the Battle of Tannenberg during the war's opening weeks. However, attempts to create such a result on the Western Front resulted in great slaughter to no effect. Armies were now too large to have flanks to turn and had too much firepower and too much defensive depth to be broken by assault.

Since World War I, the paradigm of armies maneuvering in the empty countryside for weeks and then meeting in a battle lasting usually a single day no longer applies (at least to wars between major powers). Instead, armies are deployed in more-or-less continuous lines that stretch perhaps hundreds of miles. Thus, the battle of annihilation may be considered to be mainly of historical interest, except for secondary campaigns.

The tactics executed by the Prussians during the Franco-Prussian War later served to inspire the blitzkrieg during World War II, with highly-mobile formations executing a battle of annihilation by charging straight into the enemy's weak point and attempt to encircle and destroy separate enemy pockets. The tactics became spectacularly successful during the German invasions of Poland, France and the Soviet Union until they themselves became annihilated by the Soviets in battles such as Stalingrad, Belorussia and Berlin.

During the Pacific War, the Imperial Japanese Navy's strategy was fixated on the goal of luring the numerically-superior United States Pacific Fleet into a single decisive battle of annihilation, which would force the United States to sue for peace. That was at least partially the motivation behind the surprise attack on Pearl Harbor and the Battle of Midway but was loosely followed for as long as the IJN was capable of offensive operations. The goal was never achieved for several reasons. First, the US Navy was wary of committing all of its forces to one major battle. Further, the IJN concentrated so much of its efforts on preparing for a single massive showdown, which never truly occurred, that it neglected devoting resources towards protecting its naval supply lines, which soon fell prey to a Fabian strategy when they were extensively targeted by US submarines. Even Japanese victories such as the Battle of the Santa Cruz Islands failed to annihilate their opponents utterly. The hoped-for "decisive battle" against the US Navy never came, and the IJN was gradually ground down through attrition.

== Alternatives ==
Initially, it might seem that annihilation of the opposing army is the obvious object of any military campaign. However, many battles have been fought to cause an enemy army simply to retreat or to suffer attrition, and many campaigns have been waged to avoid, rather than seek, such a battle. Reasons for not seeking a battle of annihilation include the following:

- Avoidance of the risk and cost associated with such a battle
- Lack of means to attempt such a battle
- Ability to achieve desired objectives through other means
- Accepted practice
- Political concerns
- Possibility for enemy to declare fight to the death
- Fear of repercussions

== See also ==
- Defeat in detail
- Kantai Kessen
- Swarming (military)
- Fabian strategy (antithesis)

== Sources ==
- J. Nagl. (2005). Learning to eat soup with a knife. Chicago, University of Chicago Press.
- Hart, B. H. Liddell. (1991) Strategy, Second Revised Edition. New York, Meridian.
