= Kamaran =

Island in Yemen

Native name: كمران Kamarān
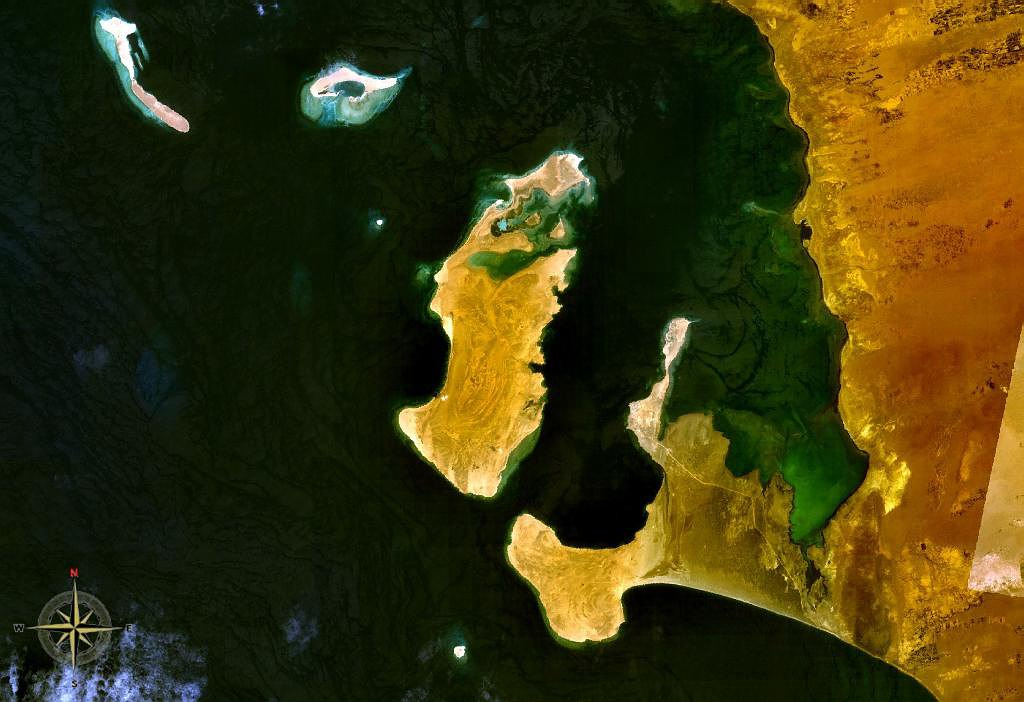
- Kamaran seen from space

- Location within Yemen

Geography
- Location: Red Sea
- Coordinates: 15.35°N 42.59°E

Administration
- Yemen

Kamaran (Arabic: كمران, romanized: Kamarān) is the largest Yemeni island in the Red Sea. The 108 km^{2} (42 sq mi) island is 18 km (11 mi) long and 7 km (4.3 mi) wide and is strategically located at the southern end of the Red Sea. It is a "shelf island" located in the shallow waters of the Arabian Peninsula's continental shelf with coral reefs surrounding three sides of the island. The population numbers 2,200. Kamaran is generally flat, with a few hills in the south. Its highest point is Jabal Yaman (24 meters high), situated about three kilometers from Ra's al Yaman, the southeastern cape of the island.

== History ==
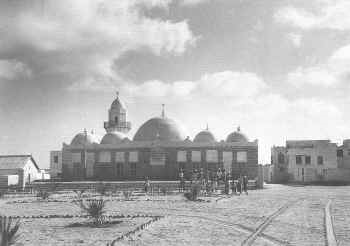
Mosque from the Turkish era

In 1513, Afonso de Albuquerque spent three months on the island after the abortive siege of Aden. The Portuguese stay was marked by a short supply of food, a small smattering of only goats and camels, alongside the outbreak of a mysterious epidemic that caused fever and blood clotting.

In 1523 Selman Reis went on an expedition in the Red Sea. During this expedition Selman Reis discovered that the Kamaran Island was occupied recently by the Portuguese, who used their base to raid the coast of Arabia, having a continuous presence from 1580 to 1620. Salman Reis and Husayn al Rumi had an Ottoman force composed of 4,000 men. After their arrival in Yemen, the Ottomans attacked the Portuguese, leading to the complete destruction and expulsion of Portuguese forces and the occupation of the island by the Ottomans. However, the Portuguese would come back and inflict two serious naval defeats on the Ottomans, which forced them to abandon the island.

During the early months of World War I, there was a debate among the British on the suitability of occupying Kamaran and the other Turkish-held Red Sea islands such as the Farasan Islands. Those who opposed the move pointed out that when war broke out, Great Britain had solemnly declared that it had no territorial ambitions in the area; even a temporary occupation might be seen by the Arabs, particularly the Imam of Yemen, as a breach of that promise. Finally, the decision was taken to occupy Kamaran and on 9 June 1915, the RMS Empress of Russia landed an armed party on the island, previously evacuated by the Turkish garrison. G. A. Richardson, formerly vice-consul at Hudaydah and Kamaran, also disembarked to act as Political Officer with additional responsibility for Police, Treasury and Customs. While the British continued to administer Kamaran from Aden, they never declared formal possession.

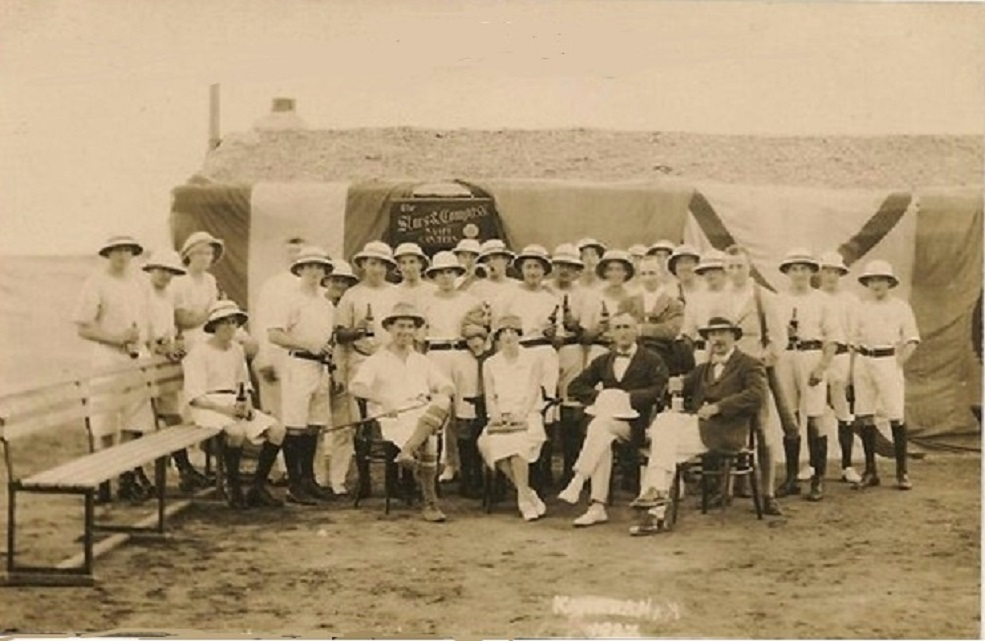
European personnel outside Kamaran's NAAFI canteen in 1927

In 1923, the Treaty of Lausanne, which divided up the defeated Ottoman Empire, declared an end to its sovereignty over the Arabian Peninsula and adjacent islands, whose future was to be "settled by the parties concerned" without specifying those parties. Britain continued to administer the island despite the objections of Yemen which claimed sovereignty over the island. In 1949, Britain formally declared the governor of Aden to be the governor of Kamaran but the island did not become a part of the colony.

=== Quarantine station ===
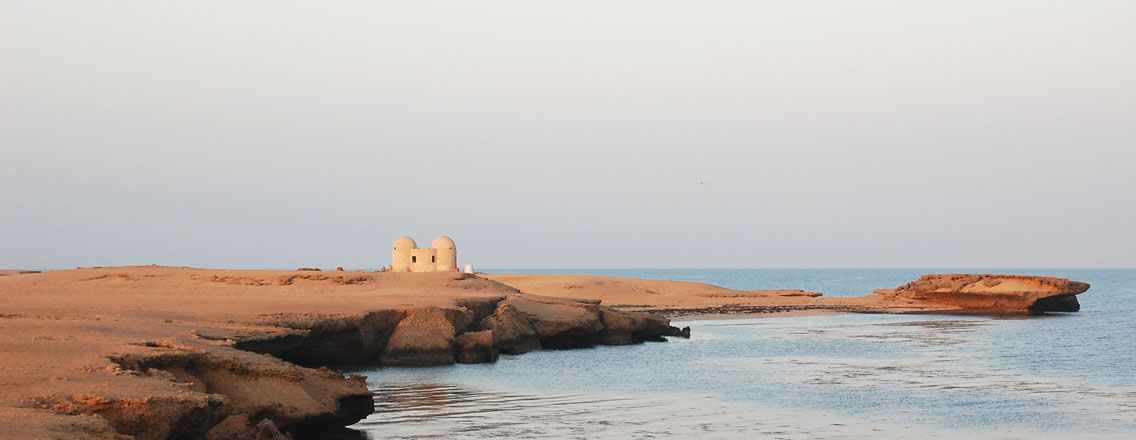
Kamaran's flat, barren landscape

After the departure of the Turks, an international control was exercised over the quarantine station, but it was in fact placed under British administration. In anticipation of a vast increase in the number of the faithful from British India, the Dutch East Indies, etc. who would make the pilgrimage the camp was greatly extended. Long lines of barrack-like sleeping quarters were constructed where the Turks had provided only wattle huts. Big disinfecting plants were installed where the pilgrims went through an ordeal of cleansing on a production line basis. A power station was built. The local water supply being inadequate, a massive distillation plant was introduced to make sea water fit for drinking. There were carpenters’ shops, machine shops, a small railway to transport fuel and stores, a wireless station, a fine landing stage, a cantonment of officials’ bungalows. This proved a bonanza for the islanders. They prospered on this trade in potential disease among the devout, and the population grew. In the village of Kamaran, the only settlement apart from a few isolated groups of fishermen's huts, fine houses and a magnificent mosque went up, and a lively trade in pilgrim requirements was conducted with the mainland. The pilgrimage quarantine station continued to function until 1953, when the Saudis opened their own quarantine station in Jeddah and put the large profitable pilgrim camps of Kamaran out of business.

Norman Lewis (writer) describes that, during Thompson's commissionership, resident islanders worked primarily as pearl divers and would rarely last past the age of 50 due to the harsh work-induced stresses.

However, this prosperity was short-lived. Determined to control the pilgrimage in all its aspects, the Saudi Arabian Government decided to construct its own quarantine station and to insist that Kamaran be by-passed. Soon, the long lines of buildings in the camps lay empty and deserted; a handful of men maintained what had become a ghost town while arrangements were debated for its breaking up and disposal.

=== End of the British presence ===
On 30 November 1967, Kamaran became a part of the People's Democratic Republic of Yemen (South Yemen) upon its independence from Britain, but was seized by the adjacent Yemen Arab Republic (North Yemen) in 1972 and became a part of a unified Yemen in 1990.

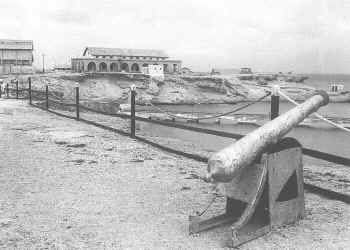
British Commissioner's office.

== Postal history ==
Kamaran Island had an Ottoman post office until 1915 and had a sub-post office of Aden beginning in 1924. From 1967, it was a postal territory of South Yemen, from 1972 of North Yemen, and from 1990 of the unified Republic of Yemen.

== Climate ==
Climate data for Kamaran Island
Month	Jan	Feb	Mar	Apr	May	Jun	Jul	Aug	Sep	Oct	Nov	Dec	Year
Mean daily maximum °C (°F)	27.8 (82.0)	28.3 (82.9)	30.0 (86.0)	31.7 (89.1)	35.0 (95.0)	36.1 (97.0)	36.7 (98.1)	36.1 (97.0)	36.1 (97.0)	33.9 (93.0)	30.6 (87.1)	28.3 (82.9)	32.6 (90.6)
Daily mean °C (°F)	25.6 (78.1)	25.9 (78.6)	27.5 (81.5)	28.9 (84.0)	31.4 (88.5)	32.5 (90.5)	33.1 (91.6)	32.8 (91.0)	32.5 (90.5)	30.9 (87.6)	28.1 (82.6)	26.1 (79.0)	29.6 (85.3)
Mean daily minimum °C (°F)	23.3 (73.9)	23.3 (73.9)	25.0 (77.0)	26.1 (79.0)	27.8 (82.0)	28.9 (84.0)	29.4 (84.9)	29.4 (84.9)	28.9 (84.0)	27.8 (82.0)	25.6 (78.1)	23.9 (75.0)	26.6 (79.9)
Average rainfall mm (inches)	5 (0.2)	5 (0.2)	3 (0.1)	3 (0.1)	3 (0.1)	2 (0.1)	13 (0.5)	18 (0.7)	3 (0.1)	3 (0.1)	10 (0.4)	23 (0.9)	91 (3.6)
Average relative humidity (%)	74	71	70	68	63	61	58	61	65	62	69	73	66
Mean daily sunshine hours	7.7	6.5	6.5	8.2	8.2	6.9	6.4	5.4	5.6	8.7	8.6	6.4	7.1
Source: Arab Meteorology Book

== See also ==
- List of islands of Yemen

== Sources and external links ==
- WorldStatesmen- Yemen
- Kamaran Island page
- Kamaran Island Photo Gallery
- Nigel Groom. The island of two moons: Kamaran 1954 at The British-Yemeni Society webpage
- Small Islands in the Near East
