= Battle of Beadala (1538) =

- Part of Calicut–Portuguese conflicts
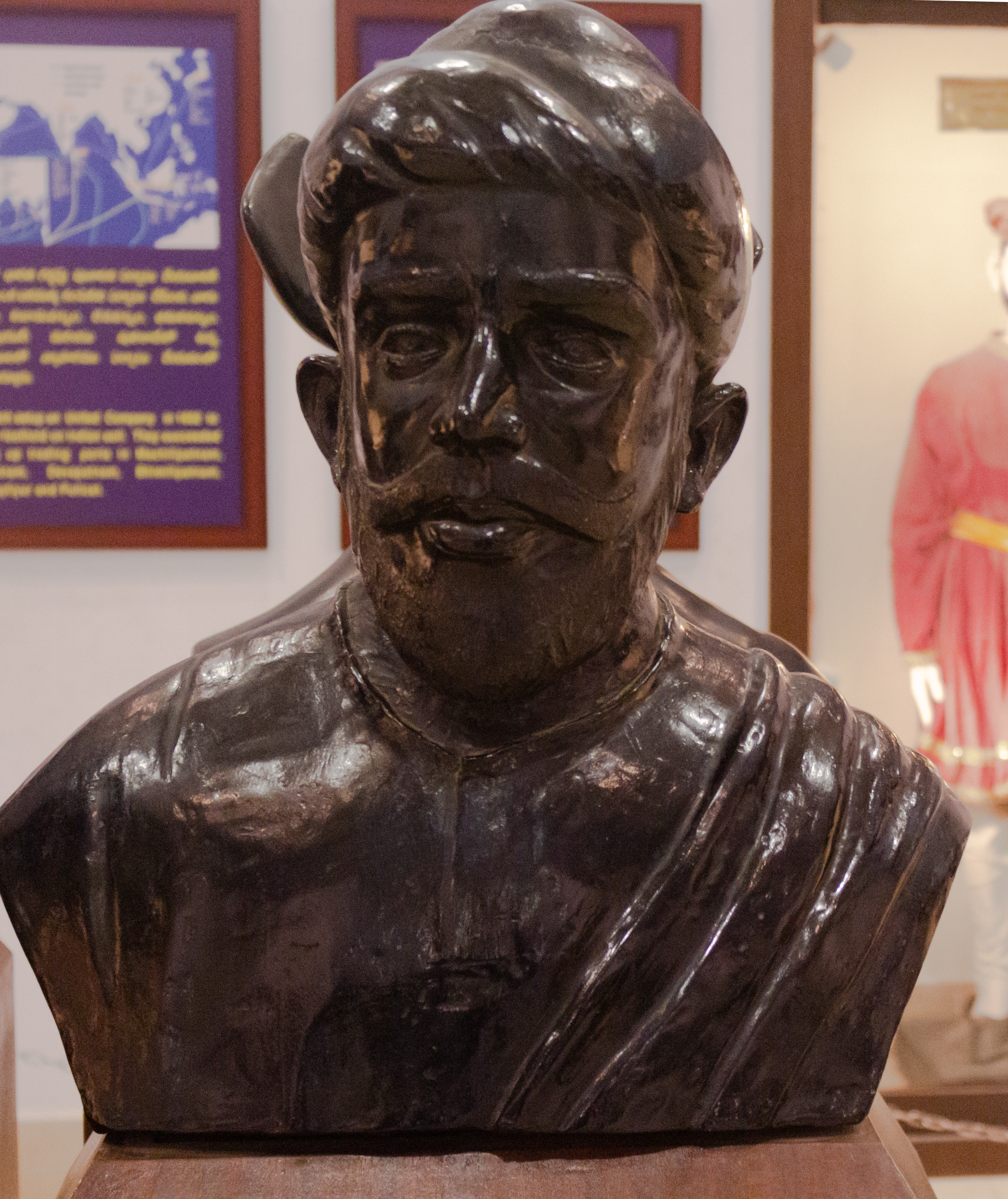
- Bust of Kunhali Marakkar (or Patemarcar)
Date	18–20 February 1538
Location	Beadala, Gulf of Mannar
Result	Portuguese victory

Belligerents
Portuguese Empire	Kingdom of Calicut

Commanders and leaders
Martim Afonso de Sousa	Patemarcar (AWOL)

Strength
~600–1,000 men 22 fustas 8 catures	~4,000–8,000; 47 paraus

Casualties and losses
18 killed 100+ wounded	~800 dead 22 paraus captured 25 paraus burned 400 bombardas captured 1,500 firearms captured

The Battle of Beadala (1538) was a military conflict between the Kingdom of Portugal and the Kingdom of Calicut.

== Background ==
In early 1538, Martim Afonso de Sousa, the Portuguese governor of India, received reports of a large Malabar fleet operating along the coast. This fleet was led by Patemarcar, who aimed to undermine Portuguese influence in the region. Patemarcar had organized a fleet of paraus, equipped with artillery and a big number of soldiers and mariners.

To suppress the fleet, Sousa organized a force of 22 fustas and 8 catures, consisting of Portuguese soldiers, Indian allies, and enslaved rowers, to pursue the Malabar fleet. The two sides engaged in a series of maneuvers along the coast, with Patemarcar avoiding a direct conflict with the Portuguese. However, he anchored near Beadala, preparing for battle in an area where he believed he could gain a defensive advantage.

== Battle ==
On the night of 18 February, Sousa positioned his fleet in anticipation of a dawn assault. His plan was to capitalize on surprise and decisively break the Malabar fleet's defensive line. At dawn on 19 February, the Portuguese fleet launched a surprise attack on the anchored paraus.

The Portuguese managed to cut through the initial defenses and close in on the main fleet. Sousa's forces captured and destroyed the paraus. Throughout the day, the Portuguese continued to press their advantage, surrounding and overwhelming smaller groups of Malabar ships.

On 20 February, Sousa ordered a final assault. The remaining Malabar forces were no longer able to resist. Many of Patemarcar's soldiers fled, leaving behind artillery, firearms, and supplies. Patemarcar himself fled the battlefield with 25 men, abandoning the fleet to its fate.

== Aftermath ==
Sousa's fleet was able to capture and destroy 47 paraus in total, and seized a supply of weapons, including hundreds of bombardas (small cannons) and muskets, with the cost of losing 18 men.

Patemarcar, upon reaching Calicut, dispatched his trusted men to recover the treasure chest he had hidden during his flight. However, one of his men revealed the hiding place to the Portuguese captain of Coulão. After an ambush, the treasure chest was seized. Rumors said that the chest was opened by the Portuguese only out of curiosity, and as a result, a large portion of the gold and gems inside mysteriously disappeared.

== Bibliography ==
- Monteiro, Saturnino. "BATALHAS E COMBATES da Marinha Portuguesa" (in Portuguese). Archived from the original on 19 October 2004.
- Danvers, Frederick Charles (1894). The Portuguese in India: A.D. 1481-1571. W.H. Allen & Company, limited.
