= Cannanore War (1559) =

- Part of Zamorin–Portuguese conflicts
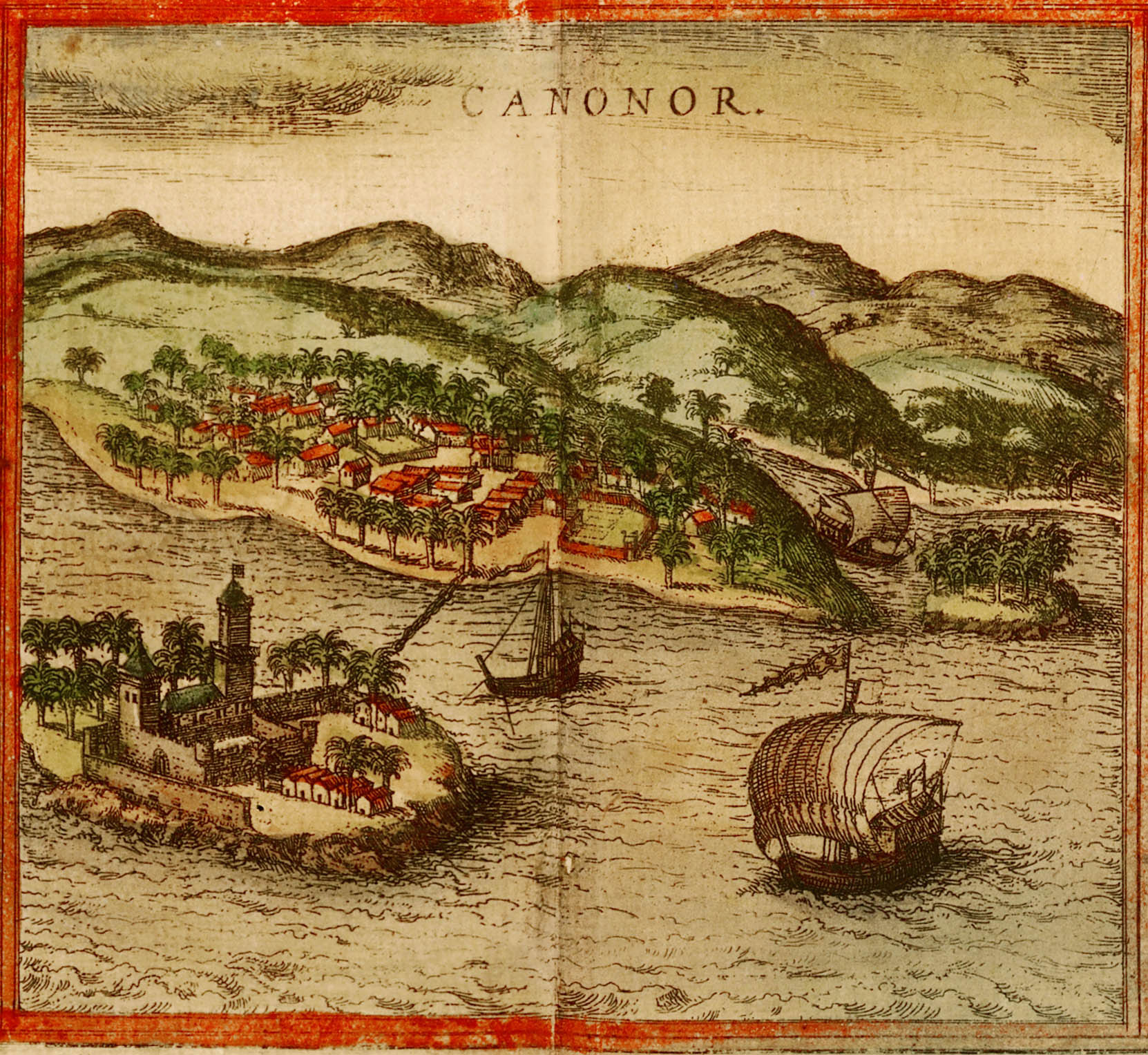
- Cannanore, 1572
Date	29 or 30 March – 13 May 1559
Location	Cannanore, India
Result	Portuguese victory

Belligerents
(Portuguese Empire) Kingdom of Portugal	Kingdom of Calicut

Commanders and leaders
(Portuguese Empire) Paio de Noronha (Portuguese Empire) Luis de Mello (Portuguese Empire) Ruy de Mello (Portuguese Empire) Antonio de Vilhena	Princes of Malabar; Ade Rajao

Strength
Naval battle: 6 ships -300 men Siege: 500 men	Naval battle: 13 ships 2,000 men Siege: 100,000 men

Casualties and losses
Naval battle: Unknown; Siege: 25 killed	Naval battle: Fleet destroyed Siege: +15,000 killed

The Cannanore War (1559) was a series of naval and land engagements between the Portuguese and the Princes of Malabar. The Portuguese successfully secured their fortress at Cannanore and restored peace to the region.

== Background ==
The Princes of Malabar, who were encouraged by Ade Rajao, sought to expel the Portuguese from Cannanore. Dom Paio de Noronha, recently appointed captain, provoked Rajao with his "despotism and imbecile pride", who immediately opened war against him, sending an army of 100,000 men to siege the Portuguese fortress.

== War ==
=== Naval battle, 29 or 30 March ===
The Viceroy immediately sent a reinforcement under the command of Ruy de Mello and then another led by Luis de Mello da Silva. This captain, instead of waiting in Cannanore for the enemy, left with a fleet to run the seas. In 29 or 30 of March, he left with 6 ships and less than 300 men to attack Ade Rajao's fleet consisting of 13 ships and 2,000 men. He razed Mangalore and destroyed Ade Rajao's fleet. However, returning to Goa, D. Constantino arrested him in the castle of Pangim, despite his victories, for abandoning his post. But, after fulfilling what the discipline required, the Viceroy went to personally seek him to prison and congratulate him for his victories.

=== Siege and defense, 13 May ===
In 13 May, Luis de Mello was then sent to reinforce Cannanore with 500 men. When he arrived, the trenches were already occupied by the enemy. Along with Antonio de Vilhena, Mello took command of the defense.

Luis de Mello led 60 soldiers for counterattacks, while Antonio de Vilhena commanded a group of 50. After 12–13 hours, the Portuguese repelled the attackers, who lost more than 15,000, while the Portuguese suffered 25.

== Aftermath ==
Struck by fear, Ade Rajao abandoned his plan to besiege the fortress and asked for peace, which was then again restored in Cannanore.

== Bibliography ==
- Danvers, Frederick (1894). The Portuguese in India: A.D. 1481-1571. W.H. Allen & Company.
- Saldanha, Gabriel (1898). Resumo da historia de Goa (in Portuguese). University of Chicago.
