= Capture of Banastharim =

Military confrontations between Portugal and India (1512)

- Part of Portuguese conquest of Goa
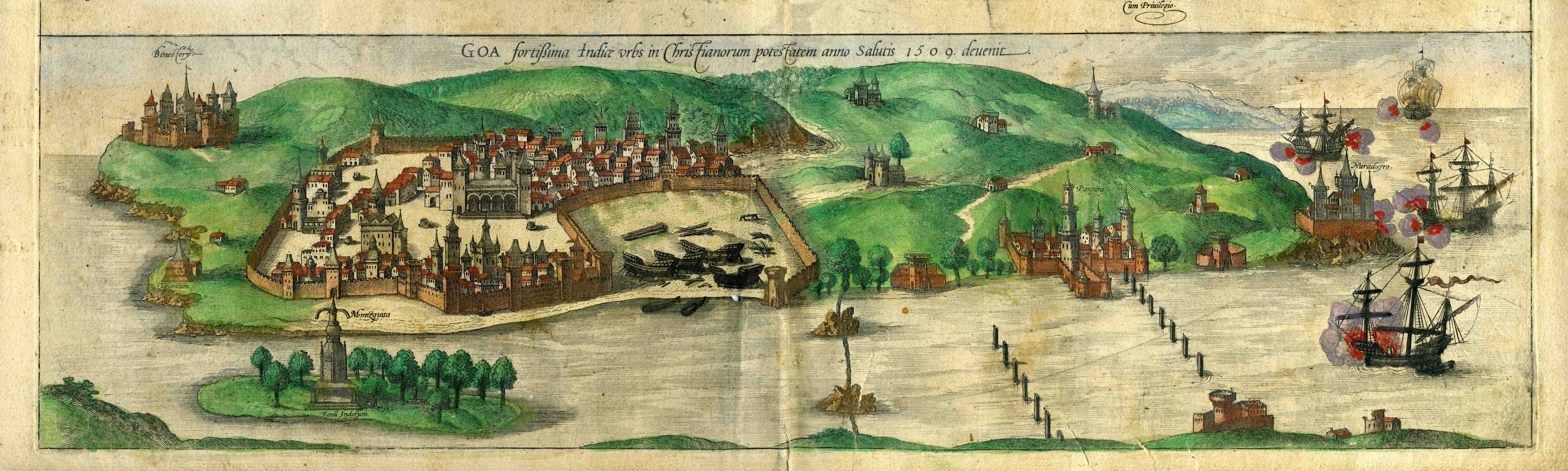
Date	First battle: Unknown; Second battle: Unknown; Third battle: 15–18 November, 1512
Location	Banastharim Fort, Goa, India
Result	Portuguese victory
Territorial changes	Capture of Banastharim Fort

Belligerents
(Portuguese Empire) Kingdom of Portugal	Adil Shahi Sultanate

Commanders and leaders
(Portuguese Empire) Afonso de Albuquerque (Portuguese Empire) Aires de Silva (Portuguese Empire) Pero de Mascarenhas (Portuguese Empire) Garcia de Noronha (Portuguese Empire) Antonio de Saldhana	Rasul Khan (surrendered)

Strength
16 vessels 4,000 men	8,000 armed men

Casualties and losses
Unknown	Heavy losses All ships and supplies given to the Portuguese

The Capture of Banastharim was a series of military confrontations between the Kingdom of Portugal and the Adil Shahi Sultanate in 1512, during the Portuguese expansion in India. The final siege leading to the capture of the fort.

== Background ==
After capturing Goa in November 1510, the Portuguese did not immediately gain control of surrounding territories like Ponda, Bardez, and Salsette. The Muslim forces, led by Phulat Khan, retreated to Banastharim, a strategic location about 14 km from Goa, and began creating insecurity in the region. Taking advantage of Afonso de Albuquerque's absence on an expedition to Malacca, Phulat Khan crossed the river and invaded the island of Goa, attempting to recapture it. The initial resistance from the Governor of Goa, Malhar Rao, and the local ally Timmoja proved futile, forcing them to flee.

Captain Rodrigo Rebello managed to rout the Muslim forces near Goa Velha with a small force of thirty cavalry men, two hundred Malabarese and three hundred natives of Goa. However, Rebello's accidental death in a skirmish left the Portuguese without strong leadership until Diogo Mendes took command. Despite their efforts, the Portuguese were in a precarious position, with limited men and resources. Phulat Khan fortified Banastharim, turning it into a base for continuous attacks on Goa.

The situation worsened when Rasul Khan, Sultan Adil Shah's brother-in-law, arrived to replace Phulat Khan. Rasul Khan deceitfully allied with the Portuguese to overthrow Phulat Khan, only to turn against them afterward. The siege of Goa began, lasting through the monsoon and severely straining the Portuguese defenses. The return of Albuquerque from Malacca in September 1512 with reinforcements marked a turning point in the conflict.

== Battles ==
=== First battle ===
Afonso de Albuquerque arrived in Goa with a fleet of sixteen vessels, bringing provisions and reinforcements. He divided his forces, sending part of the fleet up the Mandovi River while he took the remaining 4 ships along the Zuari River to cut off supplies to the Muslim camp at Banastharim.

Aires de Silva sailed with his ships in the Mandovi River and removed the stakes set by the Muslims to block the Portuguese ships. Albuquerque led the attack from a boat and continued the fight throughout the whole night. The Muslim attack on Goa continued in the meanwhile by the sea for eight days.

Rasul Khan advanced with his own force, when he was effectively resisted by Garcia de Noronha and other captains with four thousand men including Malabarese and natives. The Muslims retreated and they were chased by the Portuguese. A fierceful battle followed in which many Portuguese were killed as against the loss of one thousand Muslims.

=== Second battle ===
Albuquerque then organized his troops into three divisions, led by Pero de Mascarenhas, Garcia de Noronha, and himself. Swiss archers formed the center, with cavalry kept in reserve. A flanking maneuver by Albuquerque's forces caused confusion among the Muslim troops, forcing them to retreat. The ones retreating were attacked by the men of Garcia de Noronha's division. Many of the Muslim force were trapped in mud and died, while others tried to cross the river at Guadalim only to meet the Portuguese ships.

Albuquerque returned to the city of Goa to rest. During the two days rest, the Portuguese prepared for the siege of Banastharim. The Portuguese moved out on the third day.

=== Third battle ===
On November 15, 1512, Albuquerque launched a decisive attack on the fortress of Banastharim. Portuguese artillery bombarded the fort walls, and naval forces attacked from the river. Despite a counterattack by Rasul Khan, the Portuguese breached the walls on November 18. Surrounded and outnumbered, Rasul Khan surrendered, agreeing to return deserters, captured ships, and the fortress.

== Aftermath ==
With the capture of Banastharim, the Portuguese solidified their control over Goa. Albuquerque demolished the existing fortifications and rebuilt them, ensuring the site could withstand future attacks. The deserters who had joined the Muslims were punished by mutilation or sent to Lisbon as prisoners.

Albuquerque wrote to his monarch that:

India is now tamed and subdued under bondage and obedience... May our Lord keep it so.

== Bibliography ==
- João Paulo de Oliveira e Costa, Vítor Luís Gaspar Rodrigues (2008) Campanhas de Afonso de Albuquerque: Conquista de Goa, 1510–1512 Lisbon, Tribuna da História.
- Elaine Sanceau (1936) Indies Adventure: The Amazing Career of Afonso de Albuquerque, Captain-general and Governor of India (1509–1515), Blackie
- Alexandre Lobato (1962) António de Saldanha: His Times and His Achievements Centro de Estudos Históricos Ultramarinos, 1962
- Abdul Rahman Azzam (2017) The Other Exile: The Remarkable Story of Fernão Lopes, the Island of St Helena and the meaning of human solitude Icon Books, 2017
