= Siege of Goa (1570–1571) =

Military conflict

Siege of Goa, 1570–1571
- Part of War of the League of the Indies
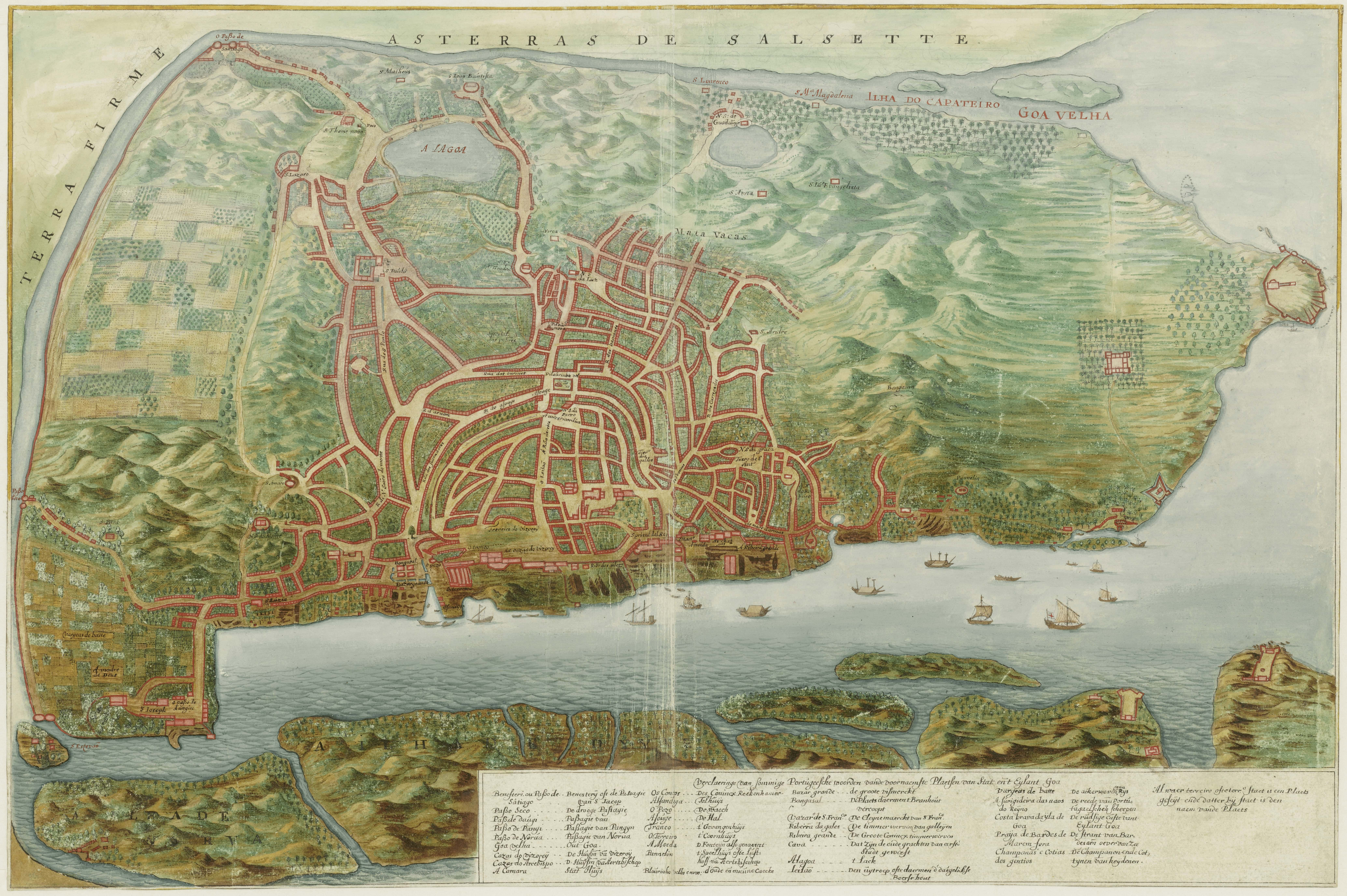
- The island and city of Goa.
Date	28 December 1570 – 13 December 1571 (11 months, 2 weeks and 1 day)
Location	Goa, India
Result	Portuguese victory

Belligerents
Portuguese Empire	Sultanate of Bijapur

Commanders and leaders
Dom Luís de Ataíde	Ali Adil Shah I

Strength
3,650 men (siege start): 650 soldiers; 3,000 militia; >5,000 men (siege end) 25–100 ships	100,000 men: 33,000 foot soldiers; 35,000 cavalry; 2,000 elephants; forced laborers; 350 guns

Casualties and losses
Unknown	8,000 to 12,000

The siege of Goa in 1570–1571 was a major military conflict between the Portuguese Empire and the Sultanate of Bijapur, as part of an alliance of Asian powers led by Ali Adil Shah I. This alliance aimed to expel the Portuguese from their strategic foothold in Goa, which was a crucial center for their colonial ambitions in Asia. The capital of Portuguese State of India was besieged by a large army commanded personally by Sultan Ali Adil Shah of Bijapur, in one of the greatest ordeals faced by the Portuguese in Asia, during which several of their strongholds were attacked simultaneously.

Viceroy Dom Luís de Ataíde organised the defence of Goa effectively and, after several months of spirited resistance by the Portuguese, the Sultan of Bijapur gave up the siege and signed a peace treaty favourable to Portugal. Dom Luís de Ataíde returned to Portugal in 1571 and was received in triumph at Lisbon by King Sebastian, who richly rewarded him and later reappoint him to the office of viceroy of India.

== Context ==
At the Battle of Talikota, the Deccan sultanates destroyed the power of the Vijayanagara Empire. Emboldened by their victory, the Nizam ul-Mulk of Ahmadnagar (Nizamaluco in Portuguese), and sultan of Bijapur (Hidalcão in Portuguese), formed an alliance aimed at recovering Chaul and Goa, which they had lost a few decades prior, but also at expelling the Portuguese from Asia.

As the sultans were well aware that whenever one Portuguese fortress was besieged all others would dispatch reinforcements by sea, as soon as they began gathering weapons and ammunition and mobilising their troops, they sought to convince as many rulers as possible to attack them at the same time. Thus, they dispatched ambassadors to the Zamorin of Calicut to convince him to attack the Portuguese fortress of Chaliyam; to the kings of the Malabar coast, urging them to attack the Portugueses fortresses at Honavar, Basrur and Mangalore, as well as to the Sultanate of Aceh, suggesting that he lay siege to Malacca once more. They also sent an embassy to the Ottoman Empire requesting that they contest the control of the sea from the Portuguese with their galley fleets.

The confidence of the sultans and the Zamorin in the plan led them to divide among themselves the territories that they intended to capture from the Portuguese. Thus, the Sultan of Bijapur would receive Goa, Honavar and Basrur, while the Nizam would receive Chaul, Daman and Bassein; the Zamorin would receive Cannannore, Mangalor, Cochim and Chalyiam. The Adil Shah went so far as to appoint his officers to positions at Goa in advance.

=== Portuguese preparations ===
Portuguese naval and battle standard bearing the Cross of the Order of Christ.

Reports and rumours about the machinations of sultans of Bijapur and Ahmadnagar reached Goa even before the end of the 1570 monsoon. Although skeptical at first, believing the distrust between Asian rulers to be insurmountable for such a plan to be possible, Viceroy Dom Luís de Ataíde eventually decided to dispatch a large armada of five galleons, one galley, two half-galleys, and five fustas, manned by 800 soldiers under the command of Luís de Melo da Silva to reinforce Malacca against a possible attack from the Sultanate of Aceh. Another fleet of three galleys and seventeen half-galleys with 500 men, under the command of Dom Diogo de Meneses was sent to patrol the Malabar coast and keep the vital trade routes with the Portuguese city of Cochin open and free of raiding from pirates. After such maneuvres, the viceroy was left with 1250 soldiers at Goa.

Once it became evident that the attacks on Goa and Chaul would indeed take place, the viceroy gathered a council with some of the highest figures in Goa, including noblemen, clergymen, and members of the city hall of Goa. Most favoured evacuating Chaul but as the viceroy considered that starting a war with a retreat was bad policy and that such a move wouldn't prevent the Nizam from then attacking Bassein, in October he sent four galleys and 600 soldiers under the command of captain-major Dom Francisco Mascarenhas to Chaul as reinforcements. Left with no more than 650 European soldiers at Goa, 1,500 Christian Goan auxiliaries, 1,000 slaves, 300 clerics, and 200 retired soldiers were mobilized and armed, thus increasing the garrison to 3,650 men, among professional soldiers and militiamen. The viceroy had four galleys, one half-galley and 20 fustas at Goa to defend the waters of the Mandovi and Zuari rivers around the island of Goa but as he had information that the Turks might join the "league", he armed a further vessels of various sizes to secure the control of the waters around Goa, although by then there weren't enough men to crew all the ships and defend the city simultaneously.

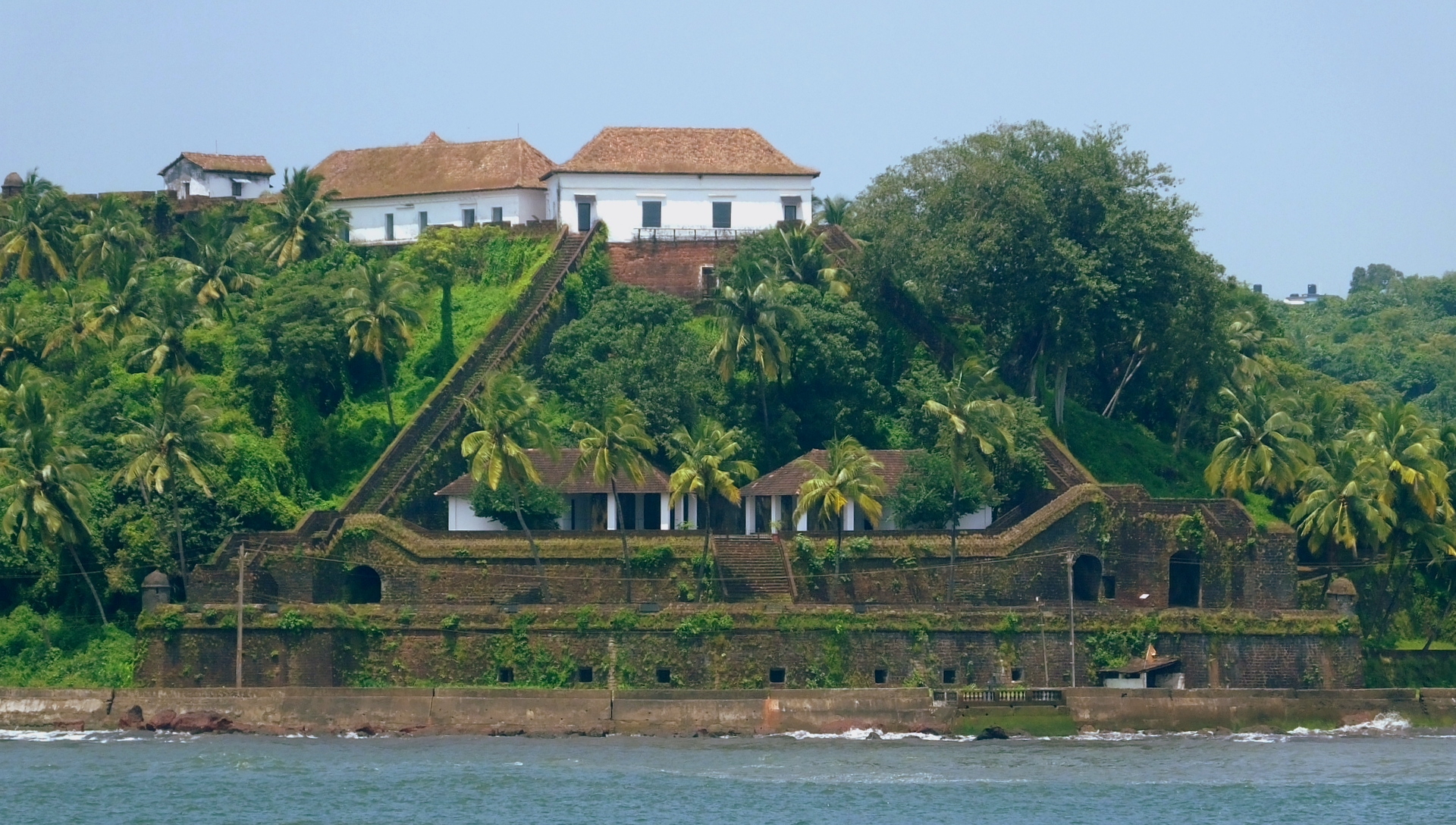
Fort Reis Magos.

Conquered by Afonso de Albuquerque in 1510, Goa stood on an island surrounded by crocodile infested rivers that could be waded across in some areas during the dry season. The closest and most important fording point to the city of Goa was the Passo Seco ("Dry Pass"), defended by the fortress of Benastarim. Dom Luís distributed his forces in 19 critical points along the eastern river banks, where artillery batteries were established, garrisoned with 20 to 80 men and a contingent of lascarins, to keep the colossal army of Bijapur from crossing. Every battery was to have visual contact with the next and their garrisons were not to leave their posts unless ordered to.

Outside the island of Goa, the Portuguese also held the fortresses of Reis Magos, Naroá and Rachol, each garrisoned with 30 to 40 soldiers. The Fortress of Reis Magos was supported by an anchored galleon.

== The siege ==
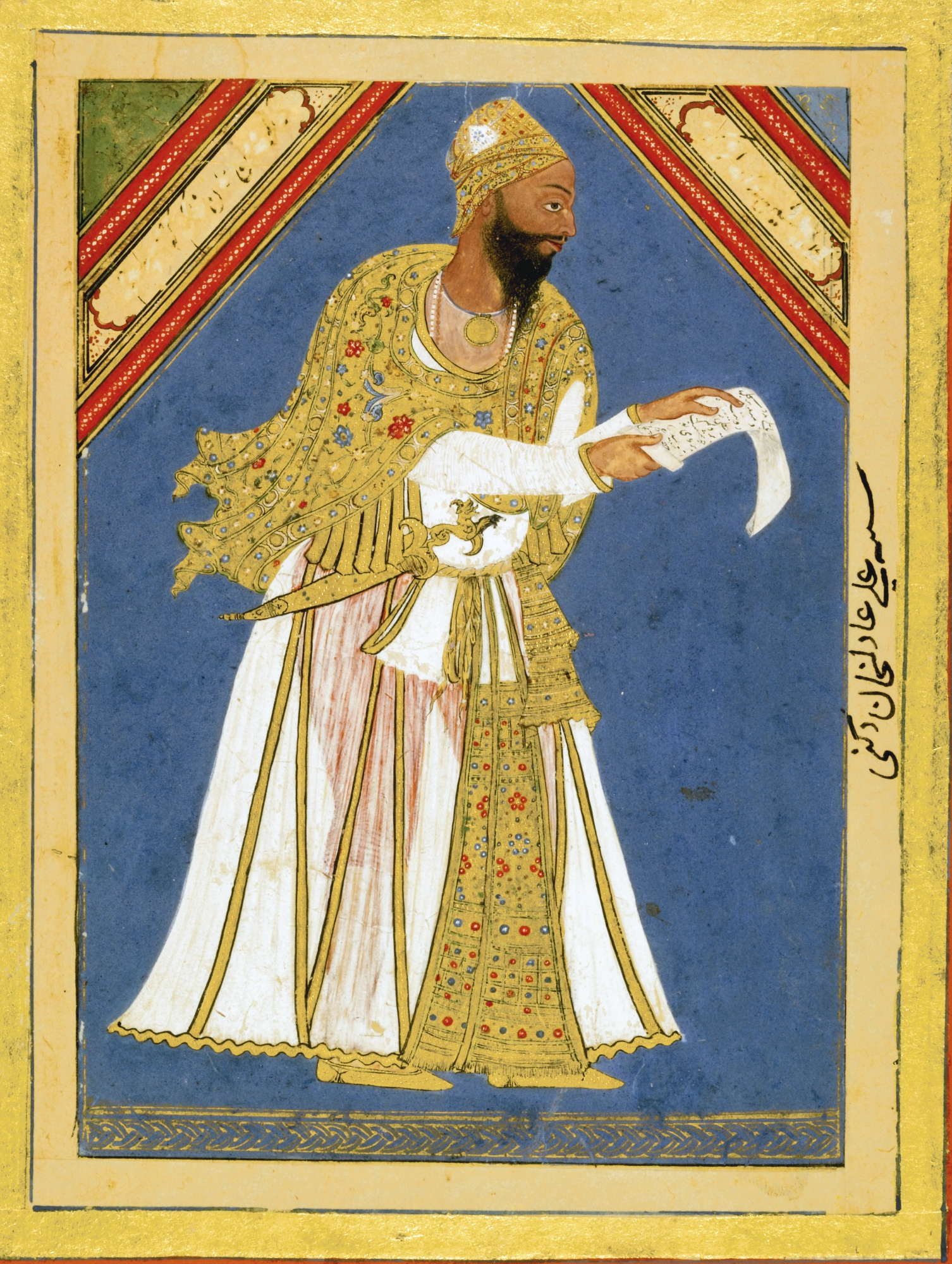
Ali Adil Shah of Bijapur.

Ali Adil Shah of Bijapur disregarded the peace treaties he had once signed with the Portuguese and set out to attack Goa.

By late December 1570, a large Bijapur army, commanded by general Nuri Khan, advanced towards Goa. Nuri Khan's vanguard arrived on December 28, 1570, followed by the main force under Ali Adil Shah I eight days later. The Bijapur forces established a camp east of the island of Goa, positioning their infantry ahead of Benastarim and deploying artillery to counter the Portuguese defenses.

By December 28, 1570, general Nuri Khan arrived with the vanguard of the Bijapur army, Ali Adil Shah himself arriving eight days later with the bulk of his forces. According to the Portuguese it numbered 100,000 men strong, of which 33,000 were infantry, including 3,000 arquebusiers, and 35,000 cavalry, plus 2,000 elephants, while the remaining were forced labourers. Besides over 350 bombards of which 30 were of colossal size, the army was also accompanied by several thousand dancing women. He established a camp around his red tent to the east of the island of Goa, the infantry distributed ahead of Benastarim and the artillery placed into position to counter-fire the Portuguese batteries. Its order of battle was:

- 4,000 horsemen, 600 musketeers, 300 elephants, and 220 cannons at Pondá, commanded personally by Ali Adil Shah;
- 3,000 horsemen, 130 elephants, and 9 cannon near the Ganja Canal, commanded by Cojer Khan, Rumi Khan, and Mortaz Khan;
- 7,000 horsemen, 180 elephants, and 8 large cannon in front of the Island of João Lopes commanded by Nuri Khan;
- 9,000 horsemen, 200 elephants, and 32 cannon in front of the Benastarim ford commanded by Camil Khan and Delirra Khan;
- 1,500 horsemen and 2 field guns in the hills opposite Benastarim commanded by Solimão Aga;
- 2,500 horsemen, 50 elephants, and 6 cannons opposite João Bangel Island commanded by Angozcan;
- 1,500 horsemen, 6 elephants and 6 cannons near Sapal commanded by Xatiarviatam;
- 9,000 horsemen, 200 elephants and 26 cannons in front of the Agaçaim ford commanded by Danlate Khan, Xatiatimanaique, Chiti Khan and Codemena Khan.
- The infantry ‘in vast numbers covered the hills and its purpose seemed to be to strike terror into the bravest spirits’.

=== Siege starts ===
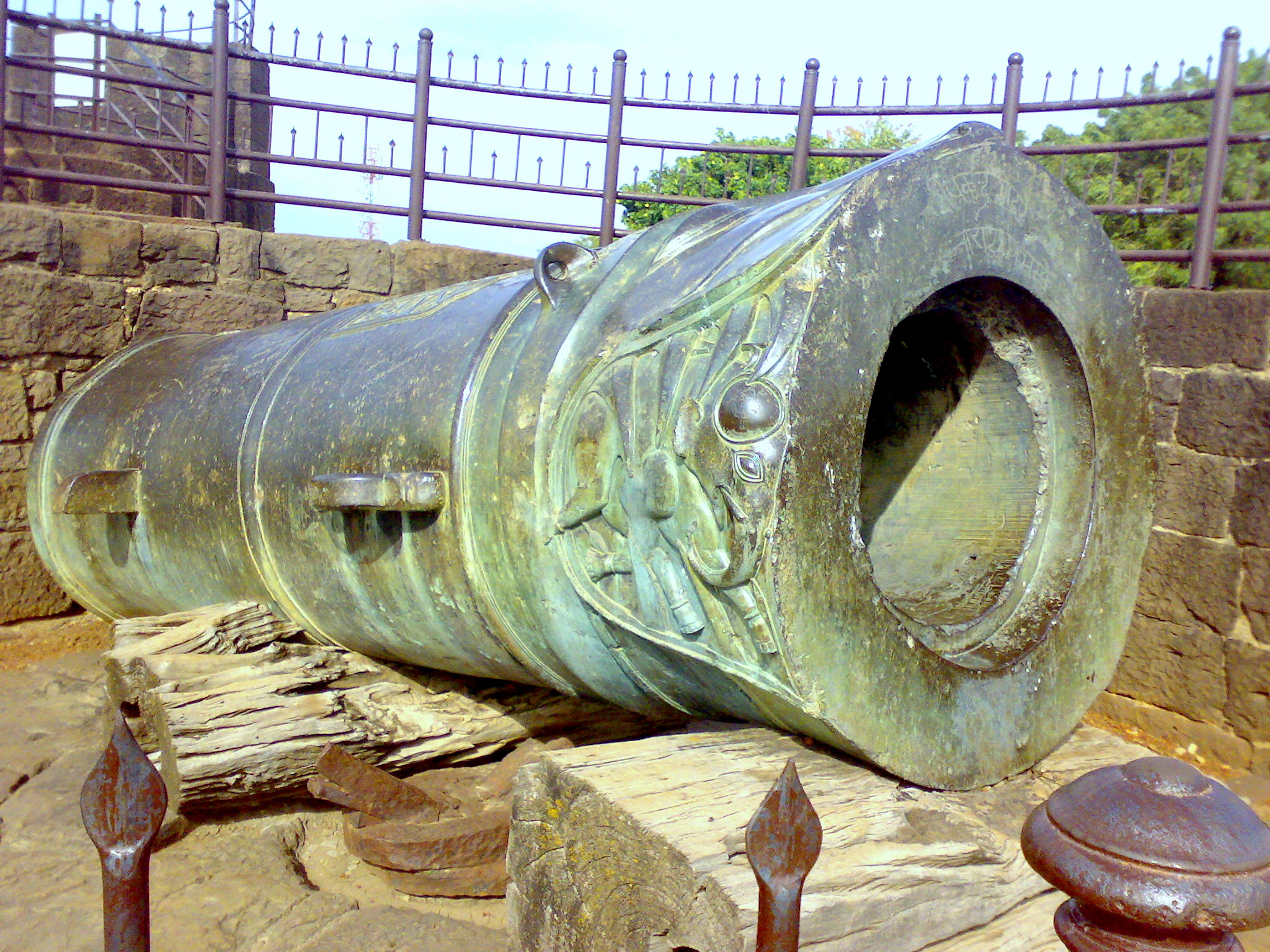
The great cannon Malik-E-Maidan in service with the Sultanate of Bijapur.

Ali Adil Shah's forces began a relentless artillery bombardment on Portuguese fortifications, namely fort São Tiago of Benastarim but Portuguese continually repaired their defenses at night when the bombardment ceased. The forces of Bijapur however were unaware of the heavy casualties they inflicted upon the garrison within the fort. To deceive the Bijapur artillery and conserve their own resources, throughout the Portuguese lines by the river banks, the Viceroy ordered torches and bonfires be lit on isolated positions by night, to give the impression of readiness and encourage the enemy to waste ammunition firing on them. Portuguese ships patrolling the river waters under the command of Jorge de Meneses Baroche also fired at the forces of Bijapur stationed all along the river banks.

The siege coincided with the usual time at which Portuguese carracks would depart for Europe but although he was advised to hold them back to conserve their crews and personnel in the defense of Goa, Dom Luís instead authorized them to depart as normal, with accounts and reports to king Sebastian of the situation.

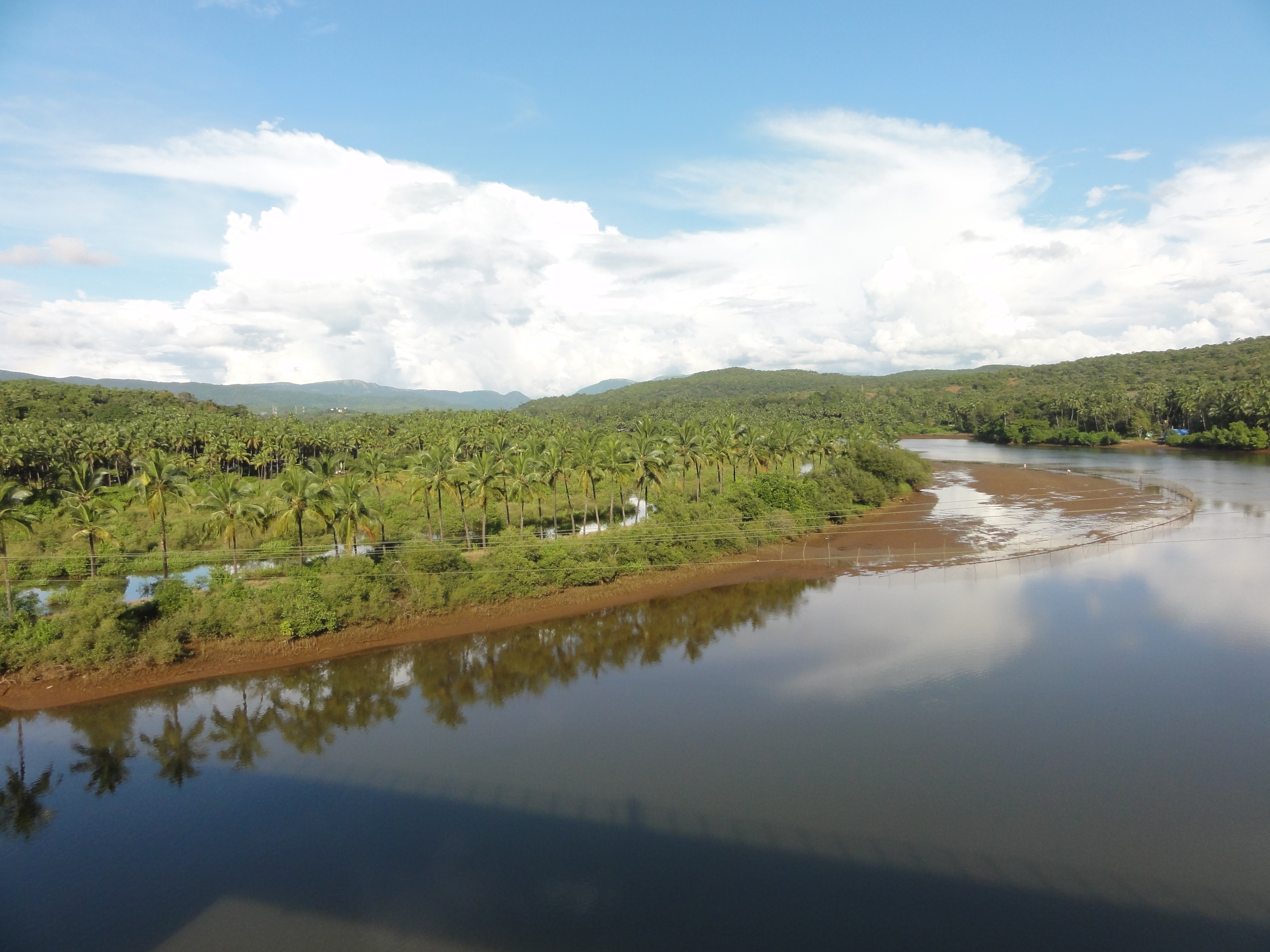
The geography around Goa.

The soldiers and crews assigned to river patrol commanded by Jorge de Meneses Baroche rendered great service in the defence of Goa, unexpectedly attacking a little all along the enemy lines, bombarding the forces of Bijapur closest to the river banks and at times disembarking to assault their camps, successfully returning with captured banners, weapons and prisoners. The brothers Lançarote and Gaspar Dias torched two villages and several farms around Goa with a detachment of 80 soldiers and returned with captured cattle and prisoners, while on another occasion, they attacked the position of Cojer Khan and Rumi Khan and jeopardized the preparations they had made to attack the island of João Lopes.

Unable to ferry his troops across since the Portuguese controlled the river waters, the Adil Shah ordered that the Passo Seco along with the part of the river closest to the city be filled up with dirt to allow the army to cross over, forcing the labourers to dig under Portuguese fire:

[the Adil Shah] determined to cross over a causeway that he ordered be made (to the Island of João Lopes, from where the entry [into Goa] would be very easy) by the great amount of labourers that he had. And for all that were killed there, never would he give up the digging, for the Moors care so little for these people that they barely have them as a loss and for as many that they lost there, never are they short of more.

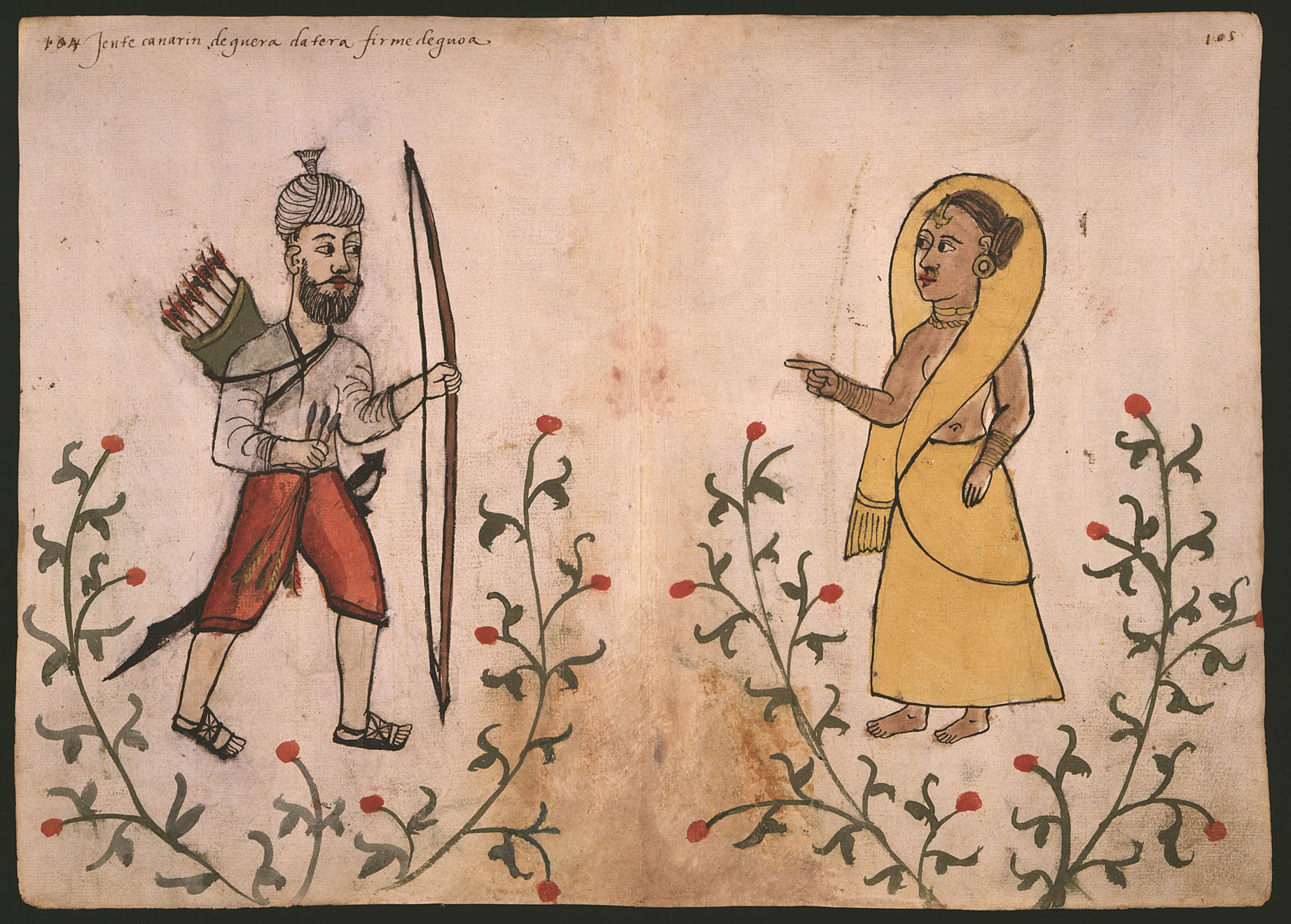
Kanaran foot-soldier, bearing a sword and longbow.

By February 1571, the attack had ground down to a standstill, as the army of Bijapur was unable to overcome Portuguese defenses. Portuguese naval forces on the other hand, set to work devastating the shores and riversides of Bijapur, intercepting tradeships with provisions and capturing large quantities of livestock that was brought back to Goa. Because of its large population, foodstuffs had to be rationed to feed the troops, but the city suffered no starvation, as the Portuguese kept the naval supply routes open.

By the end of February, a large reinforcement of men and weapons arrived from Cochin.

In early March, Dom Luís de Melo returned from Malacca, having successfully defended that city from an Acehnese attack, and brought reinforcements from Cochin, totalizing 1500 men. On the 13th, the Adil Shah ordered a decisive assault across the river, under the command of a Turk, Suleimão Agá. 9,000 men waded across the river either by foot or on small crafts and many reached the opposite banks, but came under heavy fire from Portuguese ships, artillery batteries, and arquebuses, until they were finally shattered by a Portuguese counter-attack of 300 men under the command of Luís de Melo and Dom Fernando de Monroy, who landed on the opposite shore, killing about 3,000 enemies. By the late afternoon, a strong storm spelled the end of the assault.

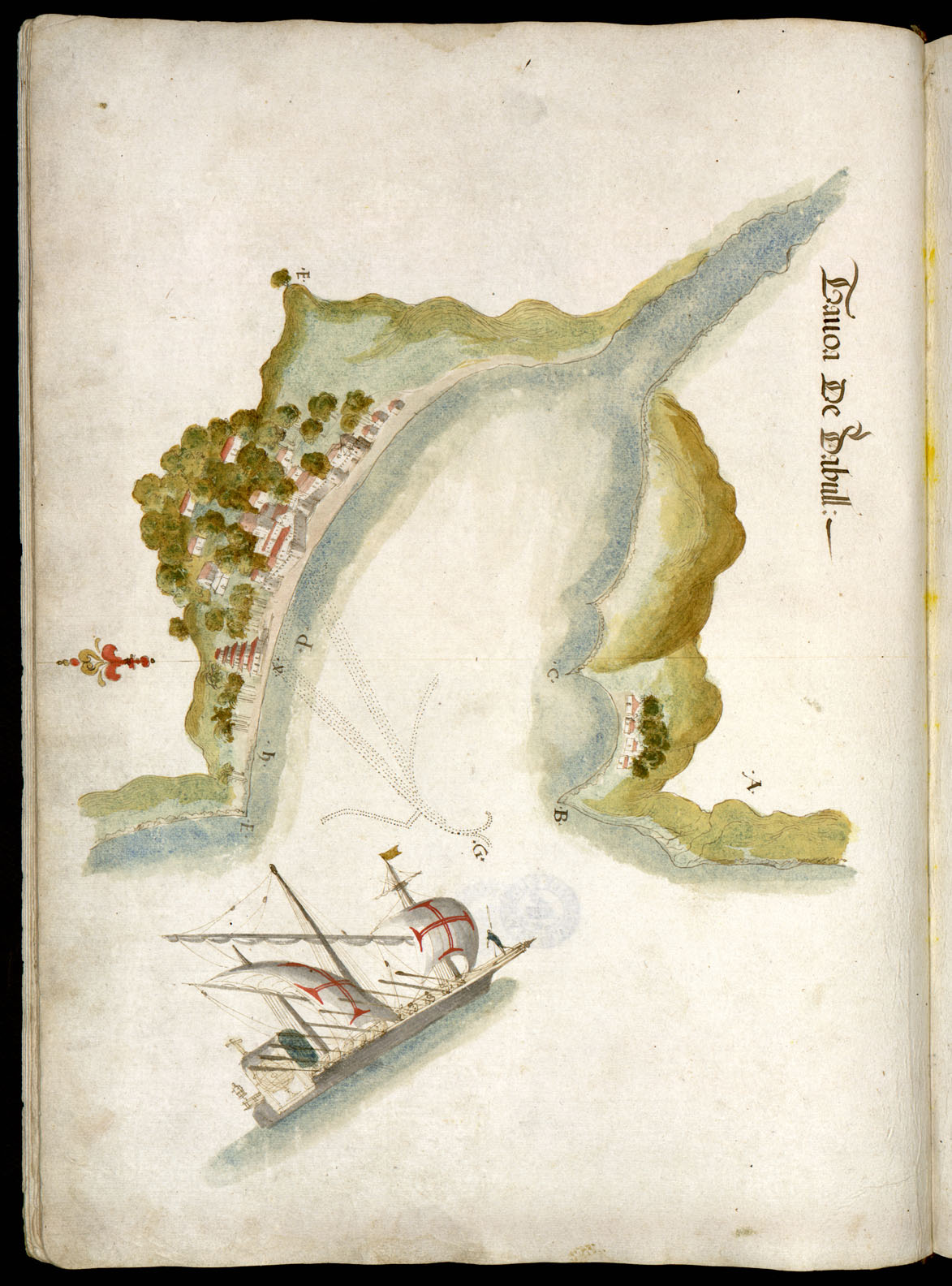
Portuguese bastard-galley at Goa.

Some soldiers among the army of Bijapur expressed their surprise that the Portuguese would fight on despite being greatly outnumbered, but they were even more surprised when they realized that after Dom Diogo de Meneses had returned from his patrol along the Malabar Coast he been sent out again, and that six ships commanded by Dom Fernando de Vasconcelos had furthermore been sent to attack the city of Dabhol. Upon returning from Dabhol, he attacked the lines of Angozcan, but this attack went badly and 40 Portuguese were killed. Their heads were carried in triumph to Ali Adil Shah, along with their flags.

Ali Adil Shah meanwhile had convinced the Queen of Garçopa to attack the Portuguese fortress of Honavar, but the viceroy dispatched reinforcements not only to Honavar but to the Moluccas and Mozambique as well. The viceroy also obtained information about what was happening in the enemy camp by bribing a Portuguese renegade who was in the service of Ali Adil Shah and even his favourite wife. Seeing the damage he was suffering from so few defenders, Ali Adil Shah entered into negotiations with the viceroy, though the fighting continued.

Dom Luís de Melo returned from Malacca on 6 March, having destroyed an Acehnese armada at the Battle of Rio Formoso and thus prevented that city from being besieged at the same time as Goa and Chaul. He also brought fresh reinforcements from Cochin, 1,500 men in total.

=== General assault against the Island of Mercantor ===
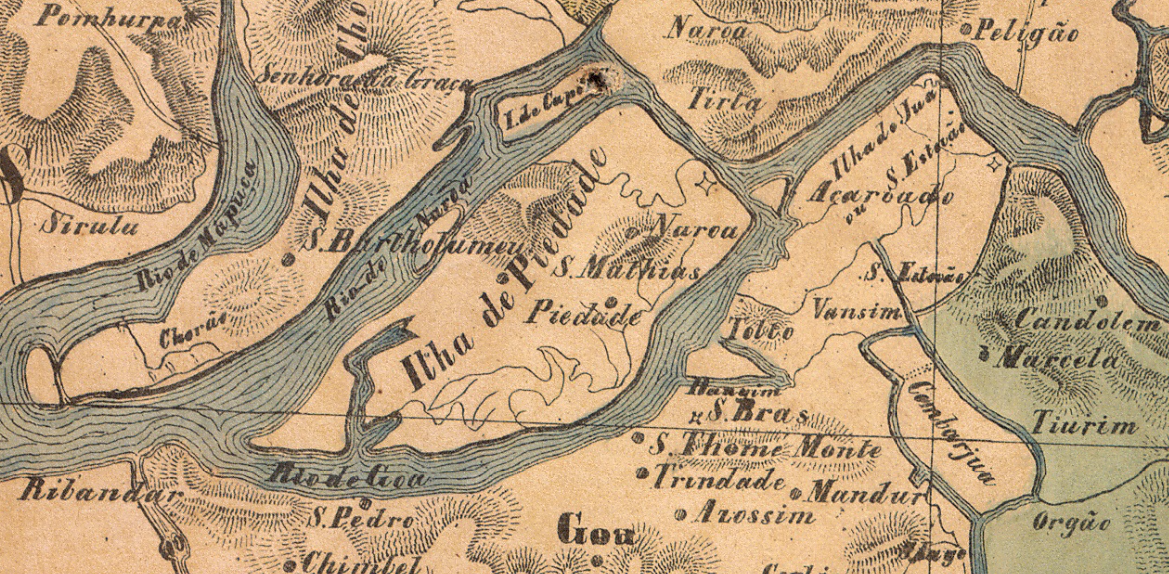
The islands of Goa.

Seeing that he was achieving little with a drawn-out siege and war of attrition, on the morning of 13 March Ali Adil Shah ordered Suleimão Aga to lead a major general assault on the island of Mercantor.

In full view of the Sultan, 9,000 men waded across the river on foot or in small boats or rafts. Many reached the opposite banks, but were met with heavy fire from Portuguese ships, artillery batteries and arquebuses, until they were finally shattered by a Portuguese counterattack led by Luís de Melo and Dom Fernando de Monroy, who landed on Mercantor with of 300 men and killed about 3,000 enemies there, including Suleiman Aga. By the late afternoon, a heavy storm spelled the end of the assault. The furious Ali Adil Shah swore not to withdraw from Goa until he had avenged this failure, but by that point he could not but recognise that his situation had become untenable and secretly sought to reach an agreement with the Portuguese.

=== Last clashes ===
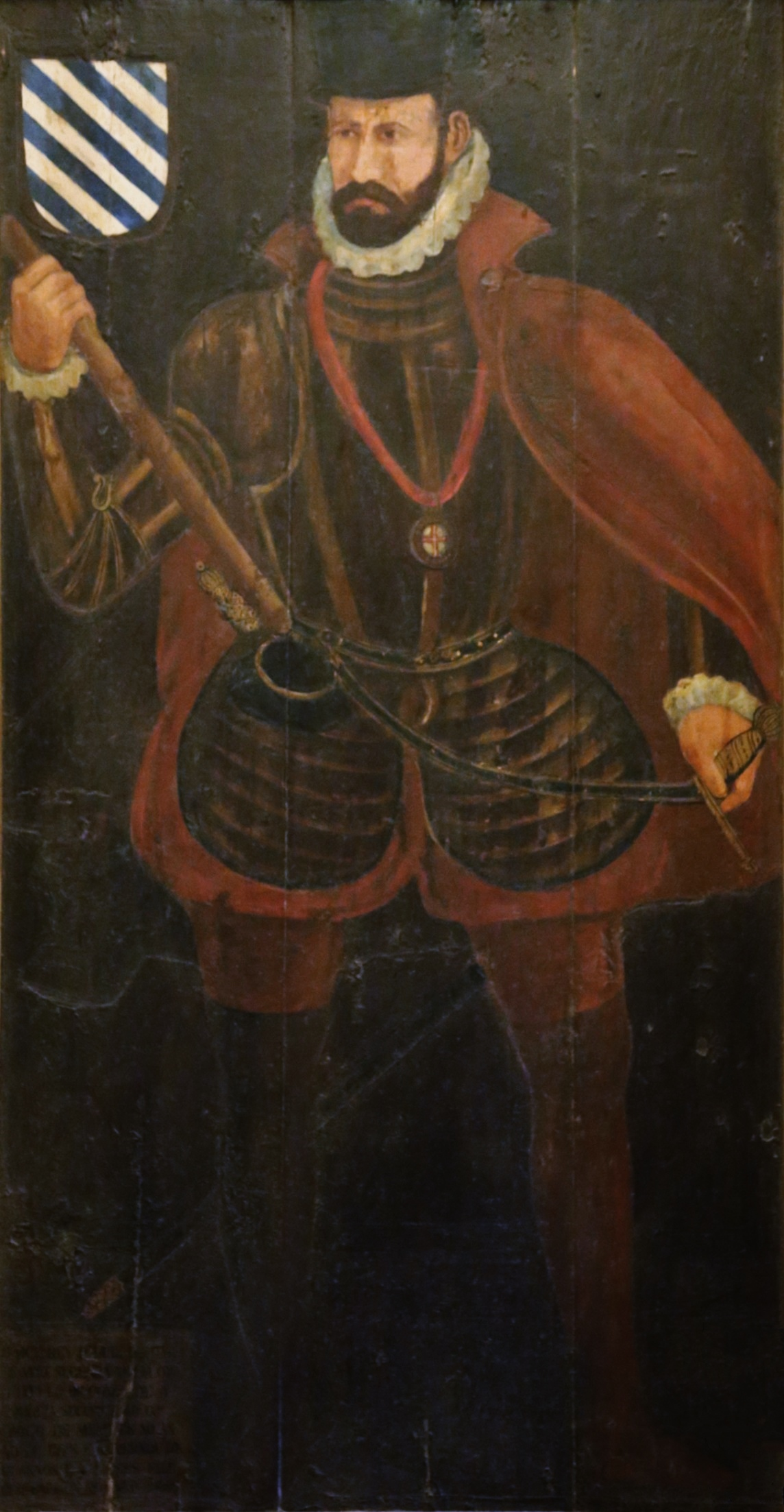
Viceroy Dom Luís de Ataíde.

The debacle at Mercantor had left Ali Adil Shah despondent but either by pride or hope in the arrival of the Ottoman fleet, he decided to keep his army camped before Goa during the monsoon season. With the coming of the monsoon rain, torrential storms forced operations down to a minimum, while the Portuguese conducted occasional sallies and raids under the rain, in which they always held the upper hand.

The Viceroy also managed at this time to sow dissent in the enemy's ranks: by April many had grown tired of the conflict, and Dom Luís plotted with general Nuri Khan, who had openly opposed the conflict from the beginning, to rebel or even assassinate the Adil Shah, which brought the Sultan wide-range suspicion towards his own command. According to the 16th century Indian historian Zinadim:

Besides that, some of his [Adil Shah's] ministers colluded with the franks to arrest him, and place on the throne a close kin, who was in Goa amongst the franks; informed as he was of this plot, Adil Shah was afraid and fled the troops; and when he was in safe place he had the plotters arrested and threw them in prison, inflicting on them great sentences and relieving them of his benefaction. In these circumstances Adil Shah was forced to make peace.

With his army profoundly demoralised, afflicted by the monsoon weather and suffering from shortage of supplies, in 15 August the Adil Shah ordered the steady withdrawal of his forces, having lost over 8,000 men, 4,000 horses, 300 elephants, and over 6,000 oxen in the campaign. 150 pieces of artillery were abandoned in the river. Military action gradually subsided and on December 13, 1571, the Shah formally requested peace with the Portuguese.

== Aftermath ==
Despite being besieged, the Portuguese managed to keep their naval supply lines open, which was crucial for their defense and morale. The strategic acumen of Dom Luís de Ataíde played a pivotal role in maintaining the defenders resilience against the prolonged siege.

Portuguese territory in Goa in the 16th century.

Ali Adil Shah was forced to come to terms that were favourable to the Portuguese: among other things, he would charge no fees from Christian merchants, harbour no enemy fleets of the Portuguese, and resume paying tribute to Goa, in exchange for Portuguese assistance in clearing the western Indian coast of piracy and authorization to trade in Portuguese ports (provided every ship carried an appropriate trading license, or cartaz), essentially recognizing Portuguese dominion of the sea.

== See also ==
- Siege of Chaul
- Portuguese conquest of Goa
- Portuguese conquest of Malacca
- Adil Shahi-Portuguese conflicts
- Portuguese India Armadas
- Bijapur Fort
- First Luso-Malabarese War
