= Alguacilillo =

Horseman who parades at the head of the paseíllo

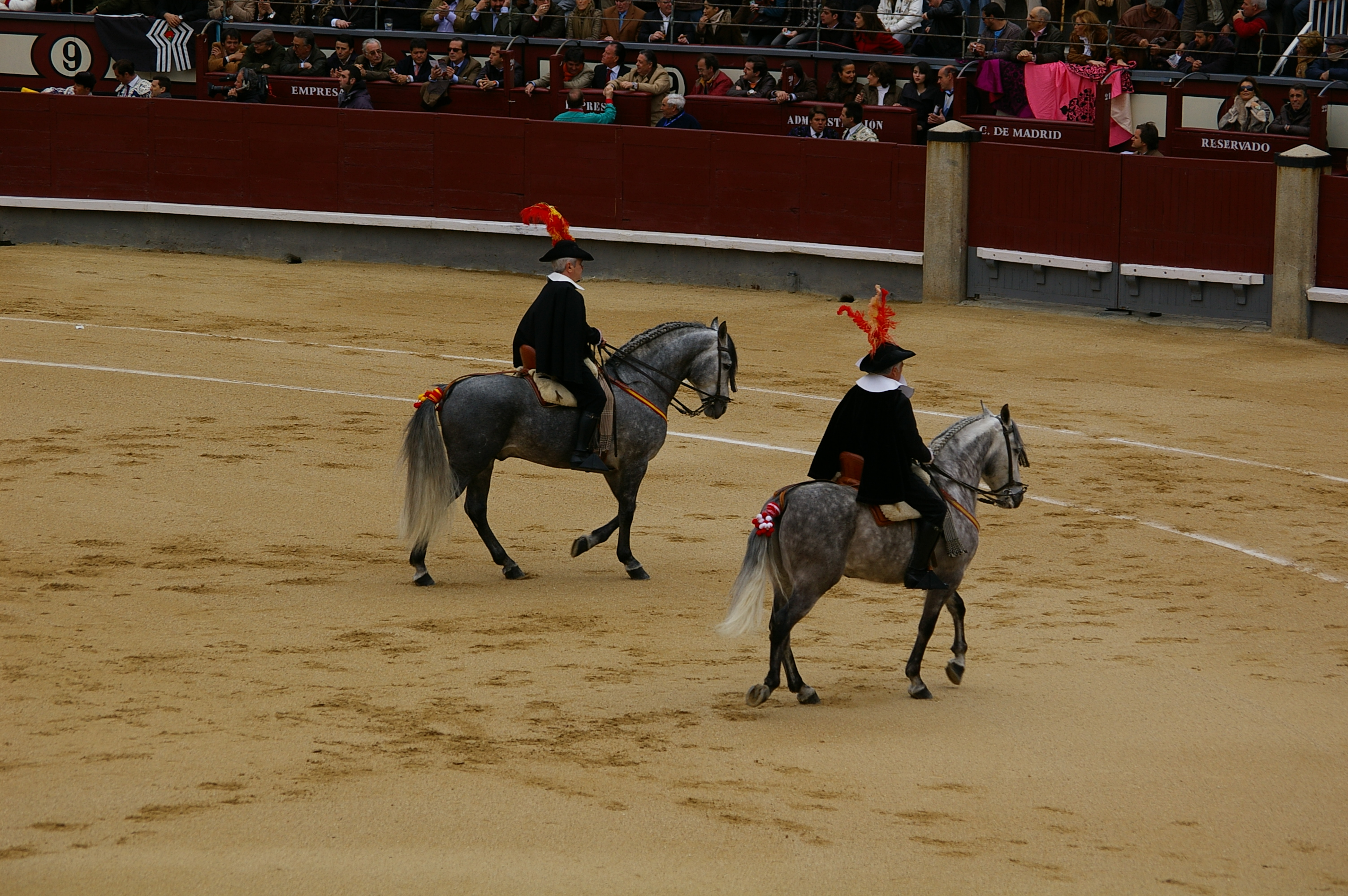
Two alguacilillos in plaza de las Ventas, Madrid

The alguacilillo (Spanish diminutive for alguacil) is a horseman who parades at the head of the paseíllo (the ceremonial parade of the bullfighters before a corrida) and wears 17th century alguacil clothes. He receives from the president of the corrida the (simulated) keys of the bullpen. They ceremonially perform the rule of law during the bullfight and transmit the orders from the president to the toreros.
