= Fernão Lopes (soldier) =

Portuguese soldier and first known permanent inhabitant of Saint Helena

- Born: 15th century
- Died: 1545; Saint Helena
- Occupation: Soldier
- Known for: Defecting from Catholicism to Islam; being marooned on Saint Helena
- Criminal charges: Desertion; Apostasy

Fernão Lopes (died 1545) was a 16th-century Portuguese soldier in Portuguese India. He was the first known permanent inhabitant of the remote Island of Saint Helena in the South Atlantic Ocean, an island that later became famous as the site of Napoleon's exile and death. He was tortured and disfigured in punishment for converting to Islam and defecting to the side of Rasul Khan when the Portuguese conquered Goa in 1510. On his way home to Portugal after these events, Lopes chose voluntary exile on Saint Helena, where he lived in almost complete solitude for more than 30 years.

== In Portuguese service ==
In 1510 Lopes, a minor nobleman and soldier, accompanied the viceroy of Portuguese India, Afonso de Albuquerque, on his conquest of Goa on the west coast of India. Shortly after its conquest, Albuquerque set sail to conquer Malacca in Malaysia, leaving Lopes behind as part of the garrison, with orders to keep the peace and rule over the local population. When Albuquerque returned nearly two years later, he found Goa under siege and some of the men had defected to the enemy side, and some, including Lopes himself, had married native women and converted to Islam.

Albuquerque's men regained possession of the territory and Rasul Khan surrendered the Portuguese renegades on the condition that their lives be spared. Instead they were tortured so savagely that half of them died within three days. Lopes, as the leader of the group, received the harshest punishment. He was bound with ropes to two wooden posts, and Albuquerque's men severed his nose, ears, right arm, and left thumb (according to others, his index and middle fingers as well) in a public square. His hair and beard were scraped off with clam shells. The survivors were then released, and fled to the jungle where they could hide their deformities and be left alone.

Lopes stayed in Goa until the death of Albuquerque in 1515, after which he set sail for Portugal, having been offered amnesty by King Manuel I. The ship stopped at Saint Helena for food and water. Saint Helena was discovered by the Portuguese João da Nova in 1502, and with its abundance of fresh water and fat tame birds, it became a regular port of call for Portuguese ships en route between the East Indies and Europe via the Cape of Good Hope. According to one source, Lopes went on land secretly and became utterly alone; according to another source he was landed with a boat and stayed on the island with a number of slaves. According to all sources, Lopes was granted a few supplies from the ship's stores.

== Marooned on Saint Helena ==
Nearly a year passed before another ship docked at Saint Helena. Lopes acclimated himself to his new home, a 122 square kilometres (47 sq mi) volcanic island almost 2,000 kilometres (1,200 mi) off the coast of Africa. The climate was tropical and mild, tempered by trade winds. At the time, Saint Helena's original ecosystem was almost intact, and goats introduced by the Portuguese thrived in the island's untouched environment (no mammals or reptiles inhabited Saint Helena before introduction by explorers). The interior of Saint Helena was a thick old-growth forest of ancient gumwood trees and other native plants that had colonized the island as many as 10 million years ago.

The island of Saint Helena in the South Atlantic Ocean.

The following is from a contemporary account of the first ship to encounter Lopes after he had been left on Saint Helena, found in a Hakluyt Society journal:

The crew was amazed when they saw the grotto and the straw bed on which he slept...and when they saw the clothing they agreed it must be a Portuguese man.

So they took in their water and did not meddle with anything, but left biscuits and cheeses and things to eat and a letter telling him not to hide himself the next time a ship came to the island for no one would harm him.

Then the ship set off, and as she was spreading her sails a cockerel fell overboard and the waves carried it to the shore and Lopes caught it and fed it with some rice which they had left behind for him.

The cockerel that Lopes saved from the ship became his only friend on Saint Helena. During the night, it roosted above his head and during the day it followed behind him, and would come if he called to it. As time went on, Lopes began to be less and less afraid of people. When a ship would lay anchor in what would later be known as Jamestown harbour, Lopes would greet the sailors, talking to them as they came ashore. Lopes began to be considered something of a saint, because of his deformities and the fact that he would not leave Saint Helena for any reason. Many people thought him to be the embodiment of human suffering and alienation, and they took pity on him. The travelers who stopped at the island gave Lopes many things, including livestock and seeds. Eventually, Lopes became a gardener and a keeper of livestock, working the soil, planting fruit trees, grasses and many other forms of vegetation.
