= Alguacil =

Title of high rank

Alguacil (in Spanish), aguazil or guazil (in Portuguese) is the title for a number of governmental office-holders.

== Origin ==
The term alguacil is derived from the Arabic term وزير (wazir), meaning Vizier. The first known use of the term dates back to 1579.

== Historical use ==
=== Constable ===
In Nahuatl, the term alguacil is a Spanish loanword that means constable or a sub-Cabildo officer.

=== Judge ===
There were two types of judges named Alguacils: The Alguaciles Mayores (Chief Justice) and Alguaciles Menores (Justice).

The Alguacils of higher importance were the Alguaciles Mayores. These positions were held by the most prominent families, so they approximated the office of Regidores. (At first they were also in charge of the local prison (jail), but this function was passed very soon to the responsibility of the Alcaide or warden.) Their function was to arrest people provided by the Inquisitor or investigators and the seizure of their property. To do this one had to be accompanied by the recipient, their family members and the Secretary (minister) of Arrests (sheriff). He could seek the support of civil authorities. It also ensured the safety of the detainees (defendants), because they had no communications with others except, of course, those authorized by the investigators. Among the junior officers, the Alguacil Mayor held the largest category with the Secret Notaries. The others functions of an Alguacil Mayor were:

- Execute the statements
- Imprison the criminals
- Resolve public order issues
- Appoint wardens of prisons
- Intervene in cases of relevant people

The title has also been given to inspectors of weights and measures in marketplaces, and similar officials.

=== Sheriff ===
In history, an Alguacil is a sheriff of a Spanish municipality who acted as the executive officer of the courses, and is considered to be the equivalent of a modern bailiff. An Alguacil will execute the decisions of an alcalde, or a local judge, and will receive a portion of the judgments he executes.

An alguacil, as the principal police officer of a municipality, was allowed to carry arms during town patrols. The same privilege was extended to the alguacil's assistants, known in Spanish as tenientes. An alguacil was not allowed to hold another office, or to have a business.

== Modern use ==
In Latin American countries or regions under Spanish influence, alguacil is currently the name for the office of sheriff or constable.

In the United States, Alguacil is used as the equivalent Spanish term for sheriff. However, the term "sheriff" has also been used, untranslated, in Spanish publications in the United States.

The term alguacil aéreo has been used as the equivalent Spanish term for Air Marshal, and the name Cuerpo de Alguaciles de Estados Unidos has been used as the Spanish name for the United States Marshals Service.

== Surname ==
The title is also used as a surname. Notable people with the surname "Alguacil" include:

- Alberto Losada Alguacil (born 1982), Spanish road bicycle racer
- Imanol Alguacil (born 1971), Spanish footballer and coach
- Isaac Becerra Alguacil (born 1988), Spanish footballer
- José Alguacil (born 1972), Venezuelan baseball player, coach, and manager

== See also ==
- Juan de la Cosa
- Timoji
