= Timoji =

15/16th-century privateer and pirate

- Born: Before 1496; Velha Goa, Bahmani Kingdom
- Died: 1512; Vijayanagara, Vijayanagara Empire
- Other names: Timoja; Timmayya
- Occupations: Privateer; pirate
- Known for: Instigator of conquest of Goa
- Office: Chief Aguazil of Goa

Timoji (Note: also known as Timoja or Timmayya) was a privateer and pirate who served the Vijayanagara Empire and the Portuguese Empire, in the first decade of the 16th century. He claimed to have been born in Velha Goa and escaped the city in 1496, during the conquest by the Adil Shahi dynasty of Bijapore. After his support in the 1510 Portuguese conquest of Goa, he was appointed aguazil of the city, for a short time.

== Background ==
Since the 14th century the Deccan had been divided in two entities: on the one side stood the Muslim Bahmani Sultanate, and on the other stood the native rajas rallied around the Vijayanagara Empire. Continuous wars demanded frequent resupplies of fresh horses, which were imported through sea routes from Persia and Arabia. This trade was subjected to frequent raids by thriving bands of pirates based in the coastal cities of Western India. Timoji acted both as a privateer (by seizing horse traders, that he rendered to the raja of Honavar) and as a pirate who attacked the Kerala merchant fleets that traded pepper with Gujarat. Timoji operated off Anjediva (modern Anjadip) Island, with two thousand mercenaries under his command and at least fourteen ships.

== Relations with the Portuguese ==
Timoji met Vasco da Gama's fleet off Anjediva in 1498, but the Portuguese admiral suspected him of being a spy and refused his advances. In 1505, he attracted the Portuguese Viceroy Dom Francisco de Almeida to an estuary and, after keeping him waiting for three days, appeared before him richly attired and offered him his services and a token tribute. In 1507 Timoji warned the Viceroy of the upcoming siege of Cannanore by Calicut forces and supplied the Portuguese St. Angelo Fort during the siege. In the end of 1507, when a Mamluk fleet under Amir Husain Al-Kurdi (named "Mirocem" by the Portuguese) supplemented the Calicut forces, he became de Almeida's main informant. Soon after the Battle of Diu, Timoji met the Vijayanagara emperor Krishnadevaraya and offered him rich tribute. He then prompted the Portuguese to conquer Goa, the main port for the horse trade. The city had been conquered from Vijayanagar by the Bahmani Sultans in 1469, and passed to Bijapur. In late 1509, the remains of the Mamluk fleet defeated in the battle of Diu had taken refuge there.

In 1510 the new governor Afonso de Albuquerque wanted to fight the Egyptian Mamluk Sultanate fleet in the Red Sea or return to Hormuz. However, Timoji convinced him that it would be easier to fight them in Goa, where they had sheltered after the Battle of Diu, and also of the illness of the Sultan Yusuf Adil Shah and war between the Deccan sultanates. So he invested in the capture of Goa to the Sultanate of Bijapur with the support of Timoji. On November, in a second strike, Albuquerque conquered Goa with a fleet fully renovated and about 300 Malabarese reinforcements from Cannanore.

They regained the support of the native population, although frustrating the initial expectations of Timoji, who aspired to gain the city. Afonso de Albuquerque rewarded him by appointing him chief "Aguazil" of the city, an administrator and representative of the native people, as a knowing interpreter of the local customs. He then made an agreement to lower yearly dues and started the first Portuguese mint in the East, after complaints from merchants and Timoji about the scarcity of currency.

== Later life and death ==
Timoji was put in command of the native troops loyal to the Portuguese. However, he soon was relieved of his command due to his refusal to follow orders. The command of the native troops was given to a pretender to the throne of Honavar, and Timoji returned to piracy.

Timoji was made prisoner after a raid, and died by opium poisoning in 1512 soon after being taken to the Vijayanagar capital. His wife and children, however, returned to Goa where Afonso de Albuquerque arranged for their upkeep.
