= Rasul Khan =

General of Ismael Adil Shah

Rasul Khan was a general of Ismael Adil Shah, the Sultan of Bijapur, who commanded an army of Bijapur troops to recapture Goa from the Portuguese Empire in 1512. Khan's troops were repelled by forces commanded by Afonso de Albuquerque, culminating in the siege of the Benastarim fortress.

== Taking of Goa ==
In 1512, Khan was asked to lead an army to reconquer Goa from the Portuguese. A previous army under the command of Fulad Khan was well ensconced in the nearby fortress of Banastarim and had repelled several Portuguese attacks, but had made little progress in taking the city.

Rasul Khan marched with a large army to Goa, but Fulad Khan refused to acknowledge his supremacy. Khan then appealed to the Portuguese for help against his insubordinate officer, and the commandant of Goa, Diogo Mendes, agreed. With the help of the Portuguese themselves, Rasul Khan was therefore able to drive Fulad Khan out of Banastarim and, once he had taken possession of the fort, demanded the surrender of Goa. He besieged Goa and cut off all food supplies, but Goa did not capitulate.

Albuquerque had returned from his capture of Malacca to Cochin, but could not sail to Goa because of the monsoon and because of insufficient forces at his command, as the Portuguese commanders of Cochin and Cannanore refused to help him. The arrival of Dom Garcia de Noronha with six ships and a further squadron of eight ships under Jorge de Mello Pereira, both fleets carrying a large number of soldiers, boosted the Portuguese forces.

On 10 September 1512, Albuquerque set sail from Cochin with 14 ships carrying 1,700 Portuguese soldiers. Once he entered the harbour of Goa, he sent six ships to bombard the fort of Banastarim and cut off Rasul Khan's communications with the hinterland.

Hearing that Rasul Khan had marched out of the fort towards the city at the head of 3,000 men, Albuquerque divided his infantry into three divisions. Although his cavalry was only 30 troopers, they were able to attack Rasul Khan's forces simultaneously in front and on both flanks. After a short but fierce battle, Rasul Khan's forces retreated into the fort of Banastarim. The Portuguese tried to follow them, but were unable to capture the castle, and Albuquerque ordered a retreat to Goa.

Albuquerque ordered trenches to be dug and a wall to be breached, but on the very morning of the planned final assault, Rasul Khan hung out the white flag. Albuquerque demanded that the fort be surrendered with all its artillery, ammunition and horses, and the deserters in Rasul Khan's camp be given up to him. Rasul Khan consented, on condition that the lives of the deserters should be spared. Albuquerque agreed, and Rasul Khan evacuated the Banastarim fort, leaving Goa entirely in the hands of the Portuguese.

As Rasul Khan retired with his disarmed troops, he met a strong reinforcement from Bijapur under the command of Yusaf-ul-Araj, but it was too late, and they retired to Bijapur.

Some of the Portuguese deserters who fell into Albuquerque's hands had joined Rasul Khan when the Portuguese were forced to flee Goa by the Adil Shahi forces in May 1510. The others had left Goa during the recent siege. Albuquerque spared their lives, as promised, but instead he mutilated them severely, cutting off their ears, noses, right hands, and the thumbs of their left hands, as well as pulling out all their hair.

== Bibliography ==
- Robert Sewell, A Forgotten Empire (Vijayanagar). A Contribution to the History of India, Adamant Media Corporation, p. 351, ISBN 0-543-92588-9
