= Fort of São Tiago of Banastarim =

Portuguese fortification

Fortaleza de São Tiago de Banastarim
- Portuguese: Fortaleza de São Tiago
- Part of Portuguese Goa
- Velha Goa, Goa, India
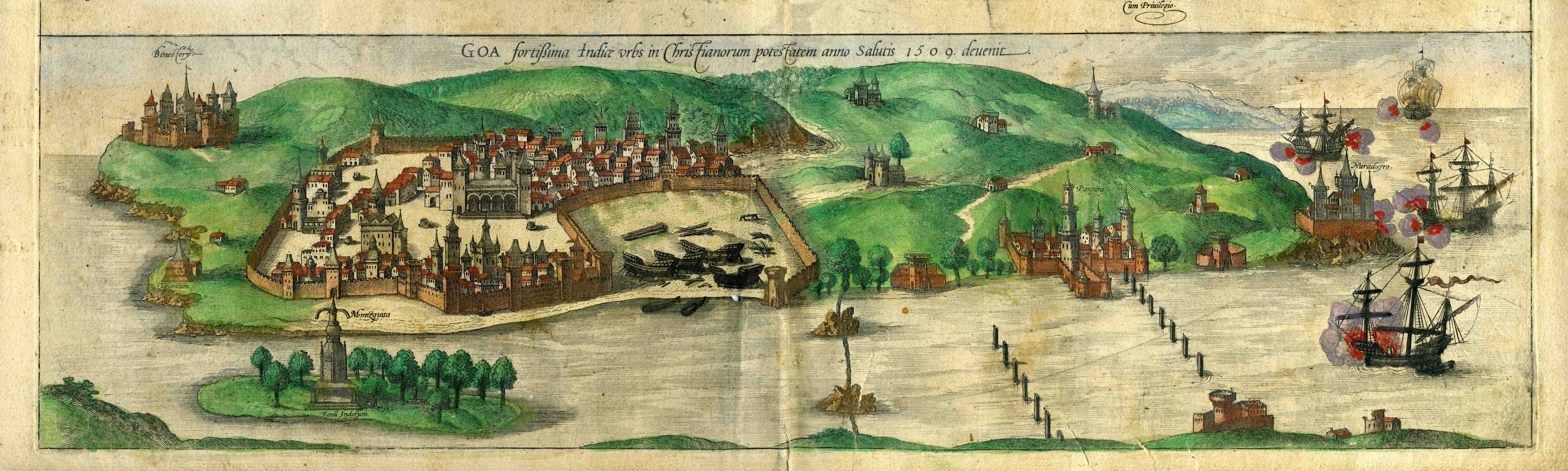

Site information
- Code: IN-GA
- Owner: Government of India
- Controlled by: Portugal (1512-1961); Bijapur Sultanate (1512-1513); India (1961-)
- Open to the public: Yes
- Condition: Ruins

Location
- Banastarim India
- Coordinates: 15.4912217°N 73.9565688°E

Site history
- Built: 1635-1681
- Built by: Portuguese India
- Materials: Brick and Stone fort
- Demolished: Abandoned

The Fort of São Tiago of Banastarim in India, also known as Fort St. James Banastarim or Benastari Castle, is located at on the right bank of Cumbarjua Canal, on the eastern tip of Old Goa, North Goa district in the state of Goa on the west coast of India.

== History ==
Erected by the local rulers, this fort was conquered by the Viceroy of Portuguese India Afonso de Albuquerque on 2 April 1512. Occupied by the Portuguese forces, it was named as Fortaleza de São Tiago (the Fortress of St James).

In 1512, knowing that de Albuquerque was not in Goa, the minister of the young Sultan of Bijapur sent an army against Goa, under the command of Fulad Khan whom the Portuguese called Pulatecao. This general invaded the island of Goa, and established himself in the fortress of Benastarim. The fort was later recaptured by a force led by Albuquerque on his return to Goa from Cochin.

In the eighteenth century, under the instructions of Jose I of Portugal, to the Governor and Captain-General of the State of India (Estado da India) in 1774, the Marquis of Pombal said: "There are in the fortress of S. Thiago sixteen [cannon] pieces, and one of them is a cannon of an unusual dimension." Also with regards to this piece of artillery, the Secretary-General of the State of India (Estado da India), Cláudio Lagrange Monteiro de Barbuda, in the nineteenth century, said:

"But this cannon of not such as unusual dimension was still ready to shoot in 1839, atop the remains of a bulwark of this fortress, probably built by the Moors, as the Instructions [of 1774] mention, and that the Baron of Candal ordered it to be collected for the arsenal [of Lisboa], in order for it to be shown as a trophy in that arsenal, which took place in 1840. It is truly a masonry feat; the length of sixteen feet [4.9 m] and three and a half and fourteen inches [9 and 36 cm] gauge lines made out of iron, and bars one-inch wide [3 cm] properly reinforced. Some writers name it the Mourisca, perhaps because it is the work of Moors." (MENDES, 1989: 167).

Albuquerque considered the Benasterim (Banastarim) Pass, where the predecessors to the Portuguese had built a fort, to be "the key to Goa".

The Portuguese thus built a new structure, integrating parts of the pre-Portuguese fortification. The work was overseen by the master Tomás Fernandes: an imposing tower was built with a barbican around it and a well inside. It was finished in late 1513; Alfonso de Albuquerque described it as being a very large tower "with bartizans in each corner, well-wrought of masonry and very handsome stone. The tower is four storeys high and can be seen from the walls of Goa; an attached tower was on the first level over the riverside, made of wood on pillars and covered like a terrace".

== Bibliography ==
- Barbuda, Cláudio Lagrange Monteiro de. Instrucções com que El-Rei D. José I, mandou passar ao estado da India o Governador e Capitão General, e o Arcebispo Primaz do Oriente, no anno de 1774. (Instructions from King Joseph I, to the Governor and Captain General of the Estado da India, and the Archbishop Primate of the East, in the year 1774.) Pangim: Typographia Nacional, 1841.
- Mendes, António Lopes. A India portugueza: breve descripção das possessões portuguezas na Ásia. ("Portuguese India: short description of the Portuguese possessions in Asia", in Portuguese.) Asian Educational Services, 1989. ISBN 8120604717.
- Mendiratta, Sidh Losa; Rodrigues, Vítor Luís Gaspar (2012). "Fortification of Tiswadi Island: Military Architecture". Heritage of Portuguese Influence.
- Mendiratta, Sidh Losa; Santos, Joaquim Rodrigues dos (2009). "Sistemas Defensivos dasIlhas de Tiswadi e de Diu (Séc. XVI-XVIII)". Centro de Estudos deArquitectura Militar de Almeida.

== See also ==
- Império português
