= Ramchandra Vishnu Madgaonkar =

Goan writer and scholar (1843–1914)

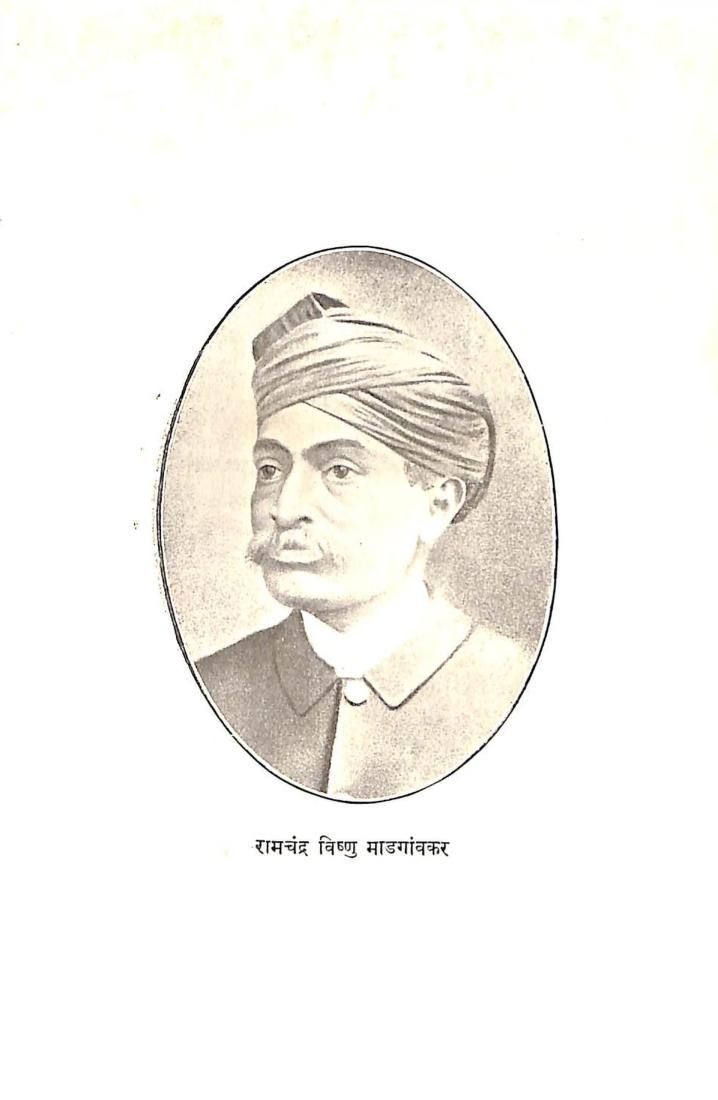
- Born: 1843; Goa Velha, Portuguese Goa
- Died: 28 April 1914 (aged 70–71)
- Education: Elphinstone College (BA)

Ramchandra Vishnu Madgaonkar (1843 – 28 April 1914) was a prominent writer and scholar from Goa Velha, Portuguese Goa. He is widely recognized for his extensive textual criticism and research into Sant Sahitya (saint literature), particularly the works of Tukaram, Swami Ramdas, and Dnyaneshwar.

== Early life and education ==
Madgaonkar was born in 1843 in Goa Velha. He pursued his higher education at Elphinstone College, graduating with a Bachelor of Arts degree in 1862. His initial fascination with literature was inspired by his paternal uncle, Govind Narayan Madgaonkar, who was an established writer. However, his specific interest and taste for saint literature were cultivated under the guidance of Dr. Bhandarkar.

== Professional career ==
Madgaonkar began his career working for Graham, a well-known British company of that era. He initially joined the firm as a salesman and was subsequently promoted to higher administrative positions. In 1893, his professional responsibilities required him to relocate abroad, where he eventually settled permanently.

== Literary career and research ==
Upon diving into the study of saint literature, Madgaonkar found the available handwritten manuscripts and printed editions unsatisfactory. The texts contained numerous textual variations (pathbhed), making it highly difficult to discern the original meanings intended by the poets. To resolve this, he took it upon himself to undertake the task of textual purification (pathashuddha).

=== Works on Tukaram and Ramdas ===
He began his research with the 17th-century saint Tukaram. In 1886, after extensive study, he published Tukarama-chi Gatha (The Collected Verses of Tukaram) alongside explanations for complex words. He also dedicated significant effort to writing a comprehensive biography of Tukaram, which he published independently. Following this achievement, he spent four years studying the works of Ramdas and successfully published the saint's complete text collection.

=== Dnyaneshwari research ===
After his work on Tukaram and Ramdas, Madgaonkar dedicated the remainder of his life to researching the Dnyaneshwari, which he frequently referred to as Dnyandevi. By his era, approximately 600 years had passed since the original composition of the text. Over the centuries, hundreds of corrupt readings (apapath) had entered the text. Although the saint Eknath had previously purified the text, newer corruptions had since crept into the manuscripts.

To prepare an authentic and pure edition, Madgaonkar compiled various manuscripts. Noting the vast variations, he undertook the intricate task of isolating and identifying the original text readings dating back to Dnyaneshwar's era, effectively bypassing the post-Eknath alterations. He was the first scholar to approach the Dnyaneshwari from this research perspective.

His efforts met with significant success, culminating in the publication of his edited version of the Dnyaneshwari in 1907. He continued working on a second, revised edition of the text until the end of his life. His contributions to the field of Dnyaneshwari scholarship are considered highly valuable.
