= Old Goa =

Old Goa Gõy, Gõechem Xar (Konkani) Cidade de Goa, Velha Goa (Portuguese)
- City
- Location within Goa Location within India
- Coordinates: 15.503°N 73.912°E
- Country: India
- State: Goa
- District: North Goa
- Sub District: Ilhas
- Established: 1510
- Founder: Afonso de Albuquerque
- Named for: The City of 'Goa'

Area
  - Total: 4 km^{2} (1.5 sq mi)
- Elevation: 6 m (20 ft)

Population (2011)
  - Total: 2,550
  - Density: 640/km^{2} (1,700/sq mi)
- Demonym: Goes / Goan

Languages
  - Official: Konkani
  - Also Spoken: English, Portuguese
  - Historical: Portuguese

Religions
  - Dominant: Catholic Christianity
  - Minor: Hinduism, Islam
  - Historical: Christianity
- Time zone: UTC+5:30 (IST)
- Postcode: 403403
- Telephone Code: 0832

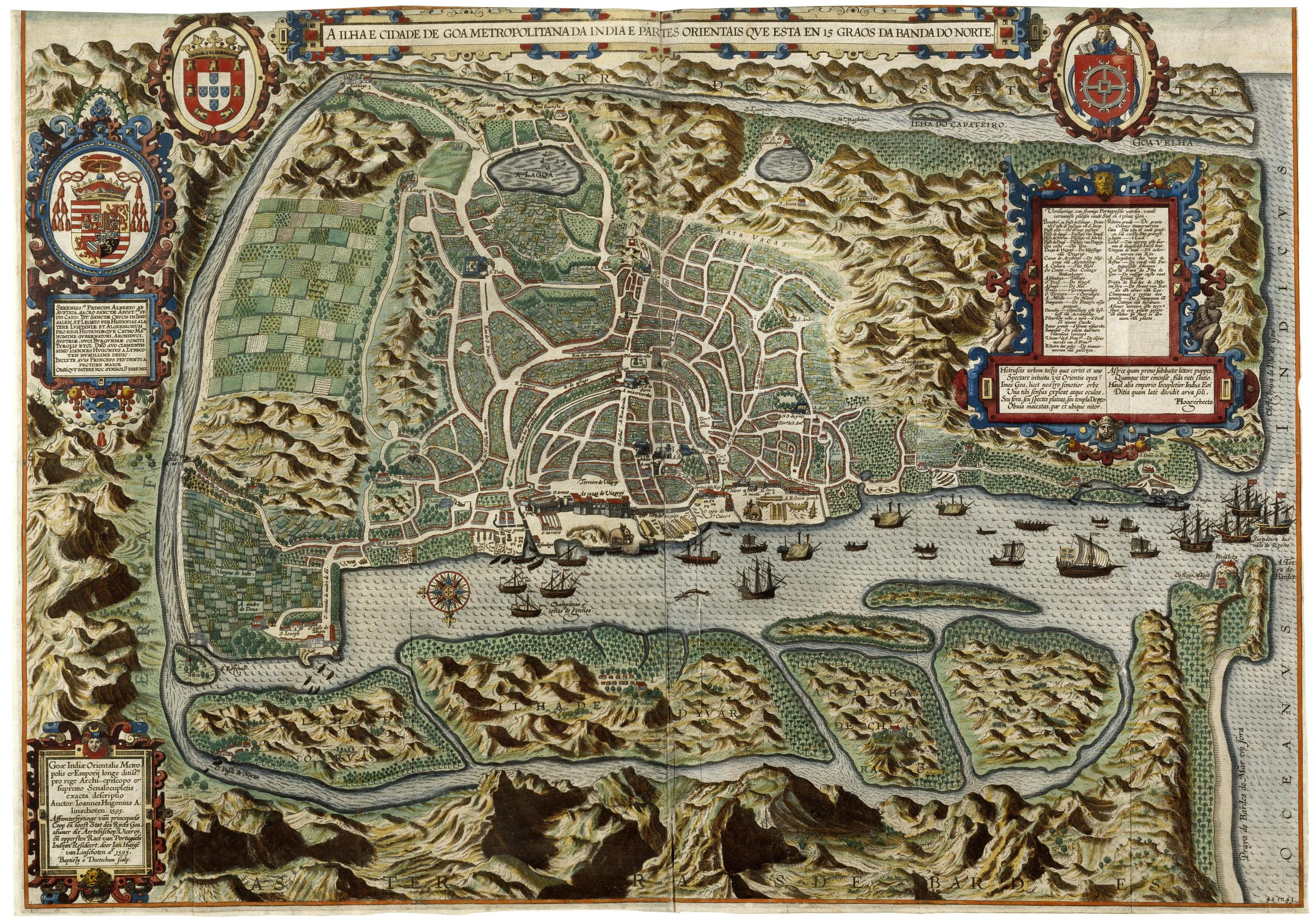
City of Goa

Goa, now known as Velha Goa (Old Goa), was a great port city on the southern bank of the River Mandovi, on the island of Tiswadi. Founded in the 15th century and held by the Bijapur Sultanate, it was captured by Afonso de Albuquerque in 1510 and became the capital of the Portuguese East Indies. Over the next century it grew into one of the largest and wealthiest cities in Asia, with an estimated 200,000 inhabitants by the 17th century. Travellers admired its grand churches, palaces, hospitals and bustling markets, and at its zenith between 1580 and 1630 it was compared with Lisbon and London. Repeated epidemics and the decline of Portuguese power in the East then brought a steep decay, and by the 1760s the city was largely deserted, with the capital moving toward Panjim. The city gave its name to the surrounding territory and eventually to the modern state of Goa. Today only its monumental churches and convents remain, as a UNESCO World Heritage Site.

== Etymology ==
The origin of the name Goa is uncertain. In Sanskrit literature and inscriptions the region and its principal port appear under several names, including Gomanta (or Gomantaka), Govarashtra (or Goparashtra), Gopakapuri, Gopakapattana and Govapuri, the last of which survives in the vernacular as Gove and Gõy. Most of these share the element go- ("cow"), which has been taken to indicate a pastoral population. A different derivation links the name to a word for tall grass in the Munda languages.

Kadamba inscriptions of the 11th and 12th centuries name Gopakapattana as a port and capital of the dynasty, associated with Goa Velha. The medieval Arab geographers and travellers, among them Ibn Battuta, describe a port called Sindābūr on the Konkan coast, which Yule and Fonseca identified with Goa. George Moraes disputed this, placing it at Chandor. Attempts to identify Goa in classical Greek and Roman sources, such as the Periplus of the Erythraean Sea and Ptolemy, remain inconclusive.

After the Bahmani–Bijapur city on the Mandovi was taken by Afonso de Albuquerque in 1510, the Portuguese called it simply Goa. As their territories grew they applied the name to the lands they added around it, and it eventually passed to the modern state of Goa. Derivations proposed by earlier Portuguese writers, such as Diogo do Couto's Goemot ("fertile land"), are unsupported by Sanskrit or Kannada evidence. After the capital moved to Panjim, the abandoned city came to be called Velha Goa ("Old Goa"), not to be confused with Goa Velha, a village a few miles away.

== History ==
The city was founded in the 15th century as a port on the banks of the Mandovi river by the rulers of the Bijapur Sultanate. It was built to replace Govapuri, which lay a few kilometres to the south and had been used as a port by the Kadamba and Vijayanagar kings. Old Goa was the second capital after Bijapur of the rule of Adil Shahi Dynasty. It was surrounded by a moat and contained the shah's palace, mosques, and temples. The city was captured by the Portuguese and was under Portuguese rule from 1510 as the administrative seat of Portuguese India.

The viceroy moved from the Palacio da Fortaleza to Panelim, a surburb on the outskirts of the city, where he resided in the Casa de Polvora. In 1759, he removed himself and his government to the future capital, Panjim (then a village about 9 kilometres to the west). Few remnants, if any, of the pre-Portuguese period remain at Old Goa.

During the mid-16th century, the Portuguese colony of Goa, especially Velha Goa, was the center of Christianisation in the East. The city was evangelized by all religious orders, since all of them had their headquarters there. The population was roughly 200,000 by 1543. Malaria and cholera epidemics ravaged the city in the 17th century and it was largely abandoned, only having a remaining population of 1,500 in 1775. It was then that the viceroy moved to Panjim. It continued to be the de jure capital of Goa until 1843, when the capital was shifted to Panjim (Ponnjê in Konkani, Nova Goa in Portuguese and Panaji in Hindi). The abandoned city came to be known as "Velha Goa" (in Portuguese, 'Old Goa'), to distinguish it from the new capital Nova Goa (Panjim) and probably also Goa Velha (also meaning "Old Goa"), which was the Portuguese name for the town on the old site of Govapuri.

Velha Goa was incorporated into the Republic of India after its annexation in 1961, with the rest of Goa. It retains its religious significance in modern-day Goa, notably in its relations with Roman Catholicism. The Archbishop of Goa and Daman holds title as the Patriarch of the East Indies. Unlike the patriarchs and the major archbishops of the Eastern Catholic Churches, the Patriarch of the East Indies only enjoys honorary title and is fully subject to the Pope. He has a place in the Latin Church similar to the Patriarchs of Venice and Lisbon. This title was conferred upon the Archbishop of Goa as part of a settlement between the Holy See and the Portuguese government concerning the link between religious and political aspects of its territories.

== Historic City Districts ==
City District	Location	Parish	Today
Santa Catarina	Urban Core	Of the Cathedral (still exists)	Known for historic churches/ Area from Monte santo to the Chapel of the Monte
Santa Lucia	Directly east of the urban core	Parish of Santa Lucia	Abandoned completey, Parish church extant. No visible signs of historic habitation.
Sao Pedro	West of the city core	Parish of Sao Pedro (Still exists)	Parish church exists, also called 'Panelim' and 'Bainguinim'.
Nossa Senhora da Luz	South of city center	parish extinct	Once a populous suburb, eventually deserted and now haphazardly developed.
Sao Braz	Easternmost point of city and island	Parish exists	also called Gaundalim
St. Tiago	Eastern border area	No separate parish	Also called Banastarim
St.Alexuis	Foot of Monte (Nsa. Sra.)	Parish extant	Forgotten, recently developed with no historic regard.

== Churches of Old Goa ==
The City of Goa became a great centre of Christianisation and was considered the supreme seat of Catholicism in the east. The archbishop of Goa controlled territories from the cape of good hope to the Moluccas. The boom in trade and commerce in the city gave rise to a class of ‘Fidalgos’ that grew extremely wealthy and powerful. They would often offer great patronage to the churches in the city. The city also had an enormous catholic population that required larger churches and more parishes. The religious orders also owned a significant number of churches and other property in the city, often by grand from the King of Portugal. All these factors meant that at its peak, the City held about 50 churches and convents, most of which were monumental and grandiose.

Today, the only surviving churches include the Se Cathedral (the seat of the Archbishop of Goa), the Church and Convent of St. Francis of Assisi, the Chapel of Our Lady of the Mount, the Church of St. Caetano and, notably, the Basilica of Bom Jesus (Which contains the relics of Saint Francis Xavier, who is celebrated every year on 3 December with novenas beginning on 24 November) The Church of Santa Monica , The Church of St. John of God, the royal chapel of St. Antony, The church of Our lady of the rosary, The church of São Pedro, The church of São Brás.

=== Historic churches in the city (Surviving) ===
Name	Status	Built by	Rank
Se Primacial	Well preserved and maintained, still in use	Archbishopric of Goa	Cathedral of Goa
Basilica de Bom Jesus	Well preserved and maintained, still in use	The Jesuits	Minor Basilica, originally the primary Jesuit Church
Sao Francis de Assisi	Well maintained; although its altars and vaulted nave have decayed. Not in use	The Franciscans	Primary church of the Franciscans
Capela de St.Catarina	Well preserved and Maintained, not in use	Afonso de Albuquerque	Commemorative chapel
Igreja de Sao Caetano	well preserved and maintained, not in use	Theathines	Primary church of the religious order
Church of Our lady of Rosary	Well preserved and maintained, not in use	Archbisphoric/ Afonso de Albuquerque	Parish Church
Church and Convent of Santa Monica	Well preserved and maintained, houses a museum and theological institute.	Dom Frei Alexio de Menezes	Royal Monastery

== Decline ==
The rise and fall of cities, as of nations, is the work of time, and Goa was no exeption to it.

— José Nicolau da Fonseca, An Historical and Archæological Sketch of the City of Goa (1878)

The decline of the city of Goa was slow, and it began while the city was still at the height of its wealth. Even then, in the words of the same account, a visitor could "make out the seed of premature decay" amid the pomp, splendour, grandeur and wealth of the capital. The capital was formally moved to Panjim only in 1843, long after the city had passed its peak.

=== Causes ===
The city stood on low, enclosed ground that was stifling and badly drained, and its water came from many polluted wells. Epidemics were frequent and killed viceroys, archbishops, inquisitors and officials in large numbers. The poor quality of the water has also been blamed for a sharp rise in deaths from cholera and malaria.From the later 16th century the city's commercial importance fell. Attacks by the Dutch and the English severely restricted Portuguese trade and revenues, and the Dutch blockaded Goa more than once in the 17th century, a second time from 1656 to 1663. During the Napoleonic Wars the British, who surrounded the Estado da Índia on all sides, occupied Goa. As the city declined, officials and residents moved gradually down the Mandovi towards Ribandar and Panjim, and the population of the old city shrank.

=== Moral explanations ===
Fonseca's description of the city in its prosperity dwells on the luxury and idleness of its upper class, who called themselves fidalgos and, in his account, lived on the earnings of their slaves. He describes "profligacy" as having become "the reigning vice among the higher classes", and their morals as "hopelessly corrupt and depraved". These descriptions rest on the accounts of travellers such as Linschoten and Pyrard, which were retold and embellished by later writers, and modern historians treat them with caution.

=== Abandonment and ruin ===
In 1774 the Marquis of Pombal ordered the cleansing and restoration of the city and the return of royal officials; three plans were drawn up between 1774 and 1777 and, although the scheme failed, they record the buildings then still standing. Buildings were dismantled and their materials reused, a practice particularly encouraged by the viceroy Diogo de Sousa, Count of Rio Pardo (1816–1821), and the suppression of the religious orders in 1834 emptied many of the convents. In 1843 the capital was officially moved to Panjim as "Nova Goa", and the old city came to be called "Velha Goa".

A 1959 plan for the "reintegration" of Velha Goa gave the central area, where the churches and convents now stand in open grounds, its present landscaped form. The surviving churches and convents were inscribed on the UNESCO World Heritage List in 1986 as the Churches and convents of Goa.

== Gallery ==
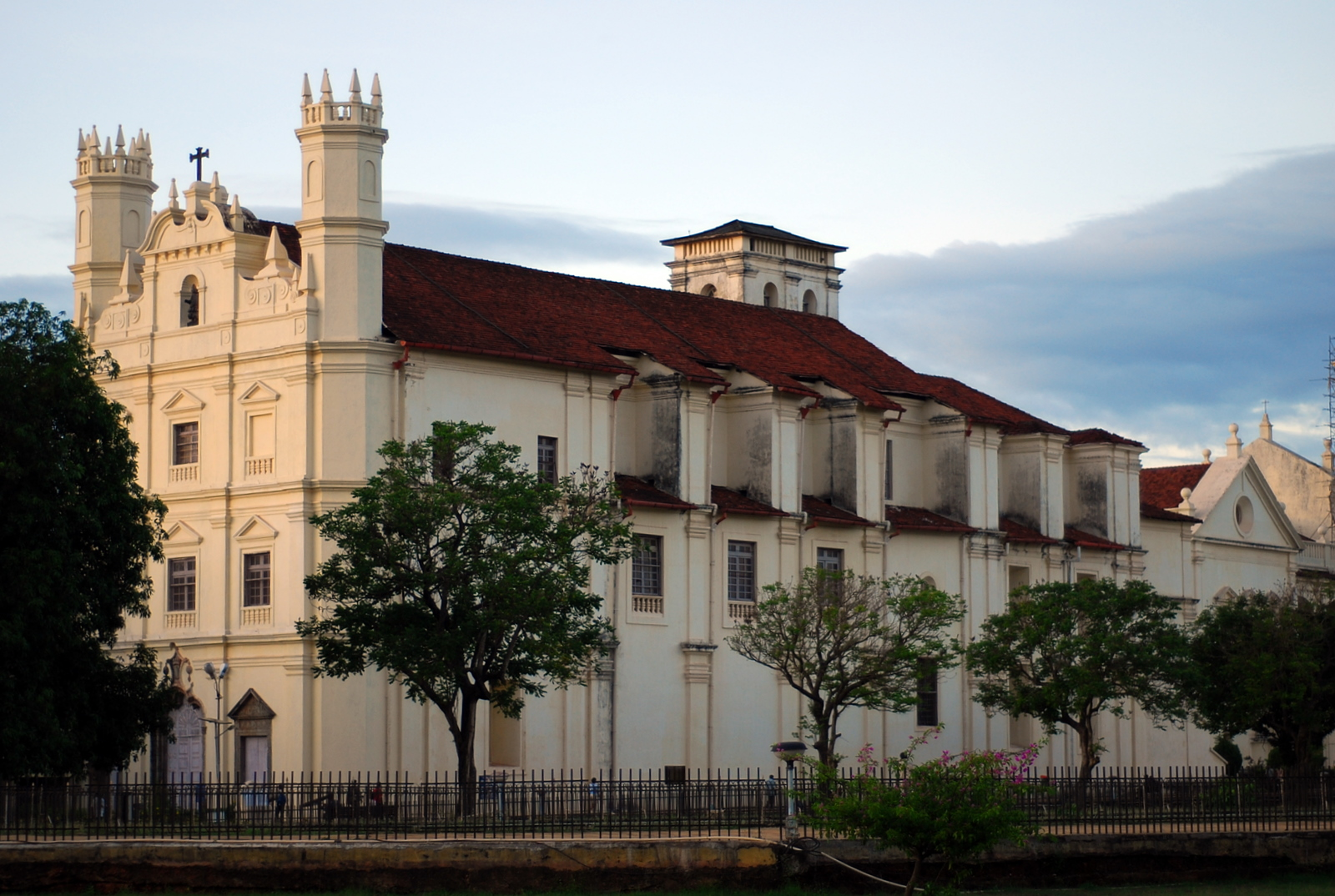
Church of St. Francis of Assisi

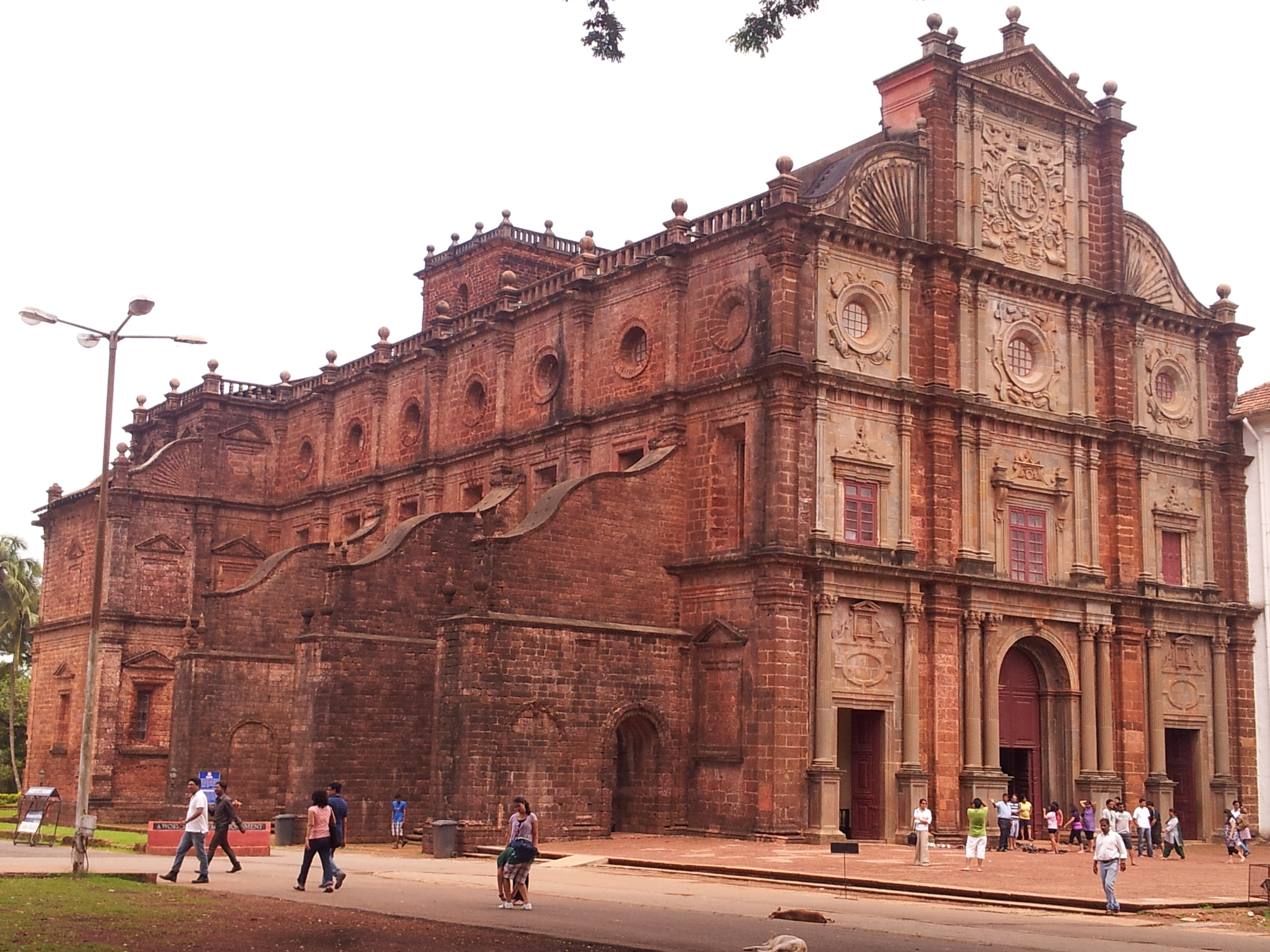
Basilica of Bom Jesus

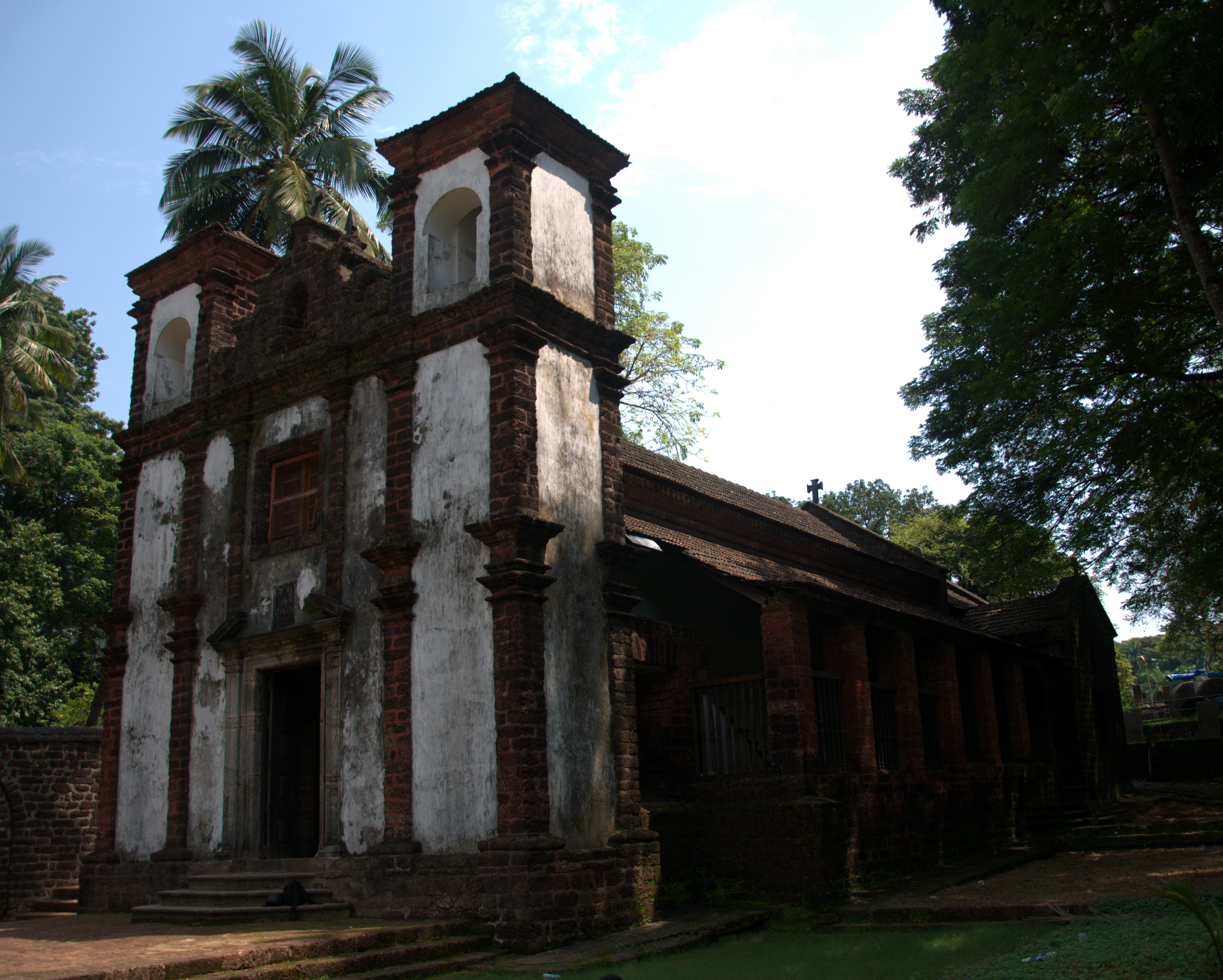
Chapel of Saint Catherine

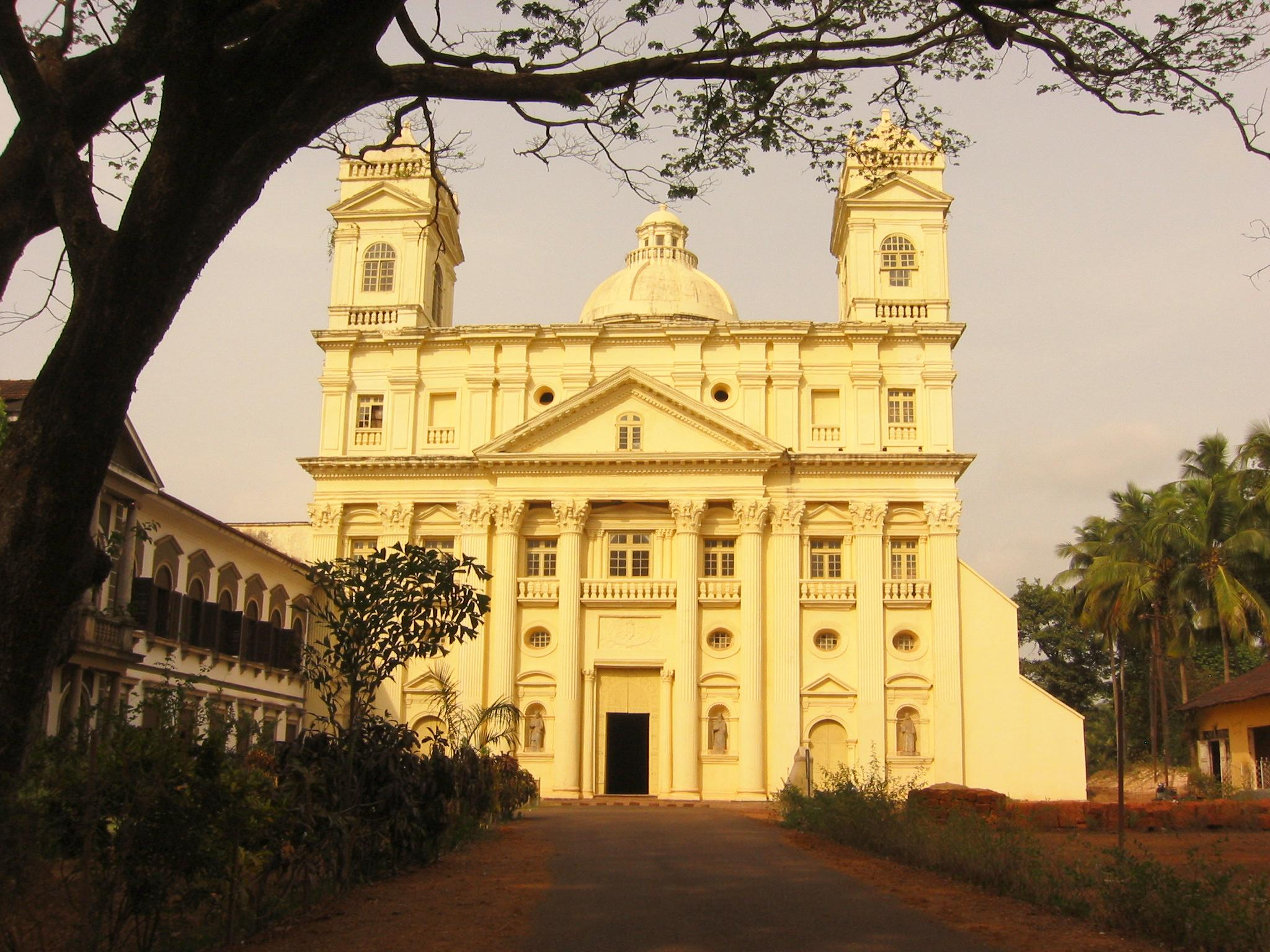
Church of São Caetano in Old Goa

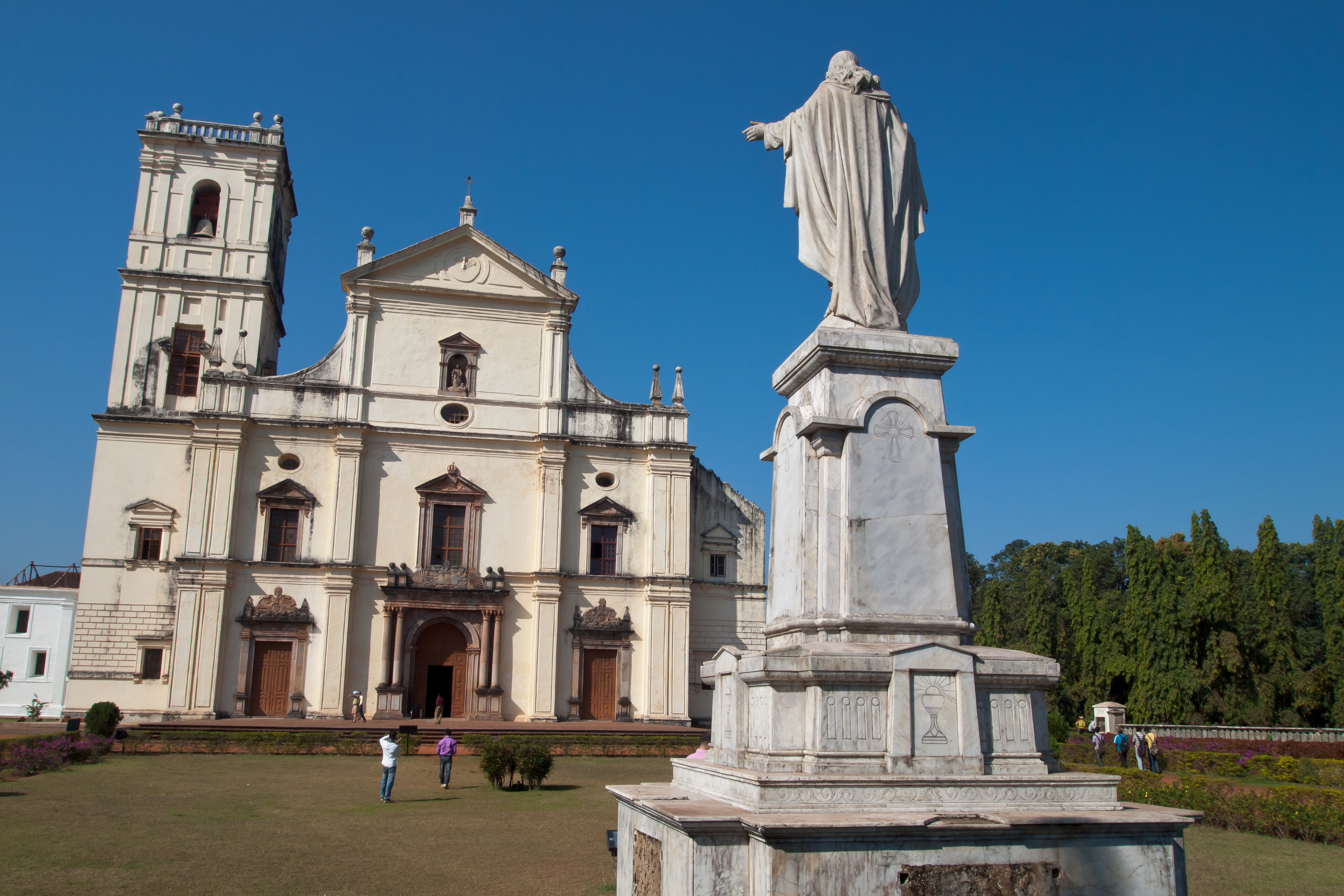
Se Cathedral

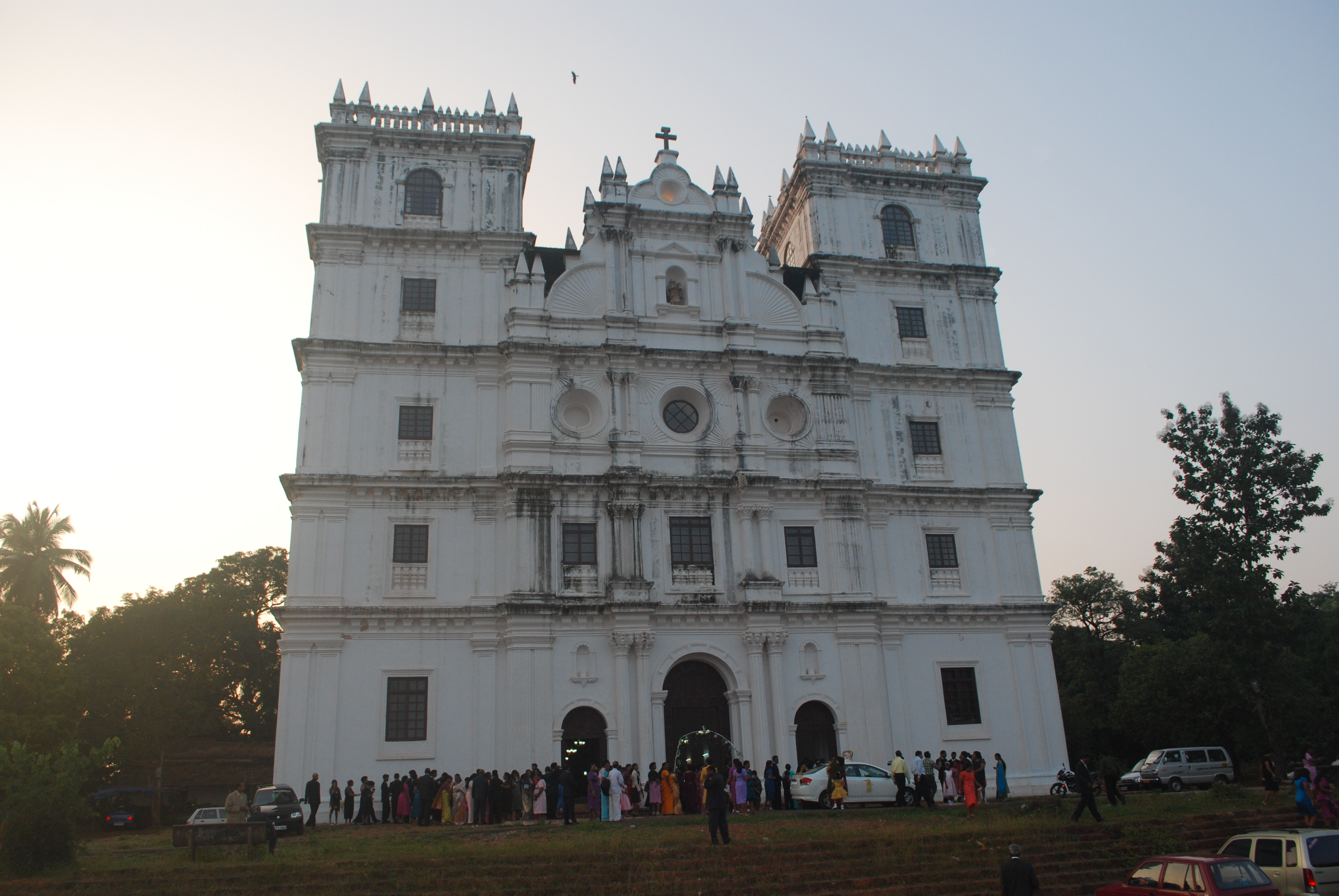
Saint Anne's Church

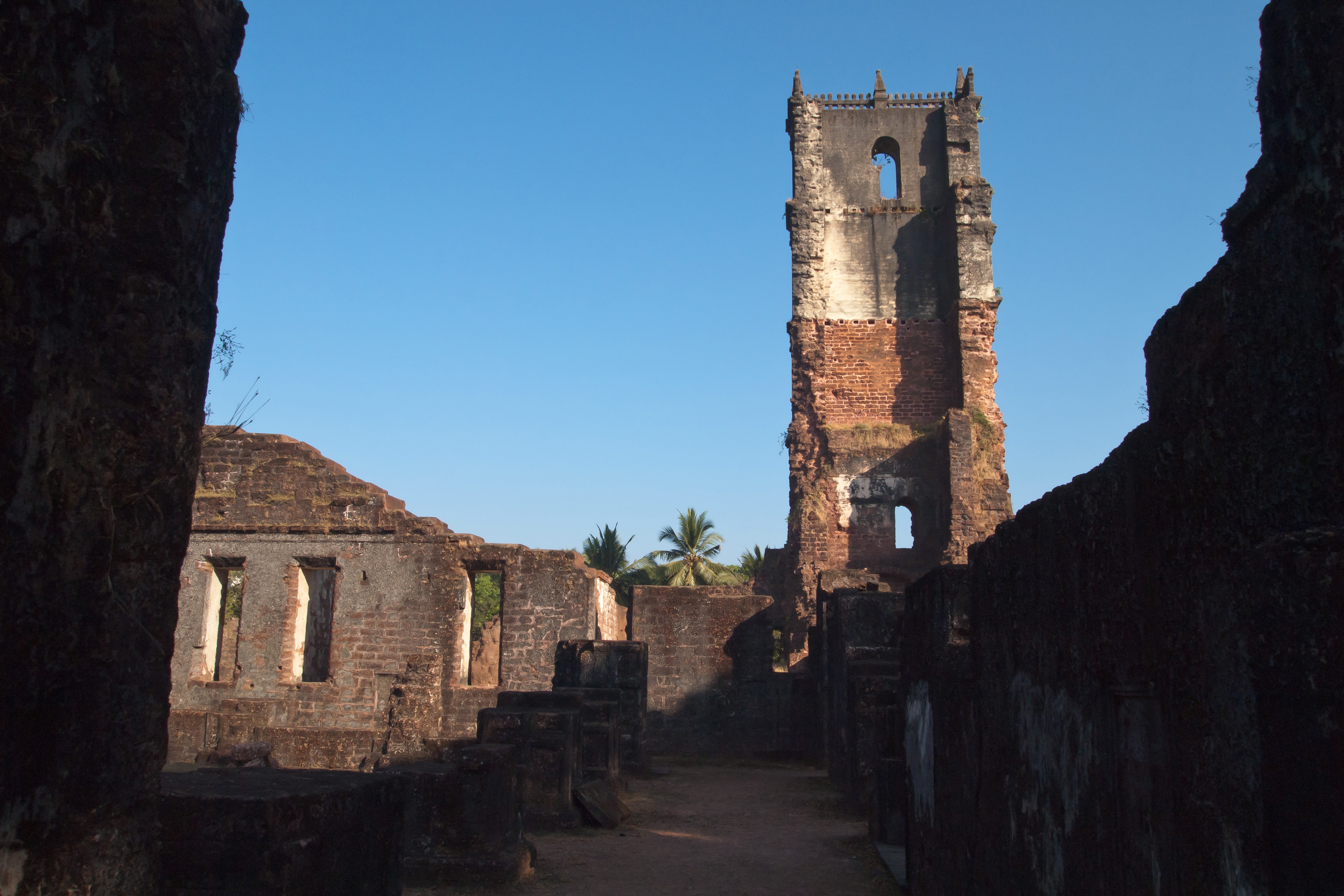
Church of Saint Augustine (now in ruins)

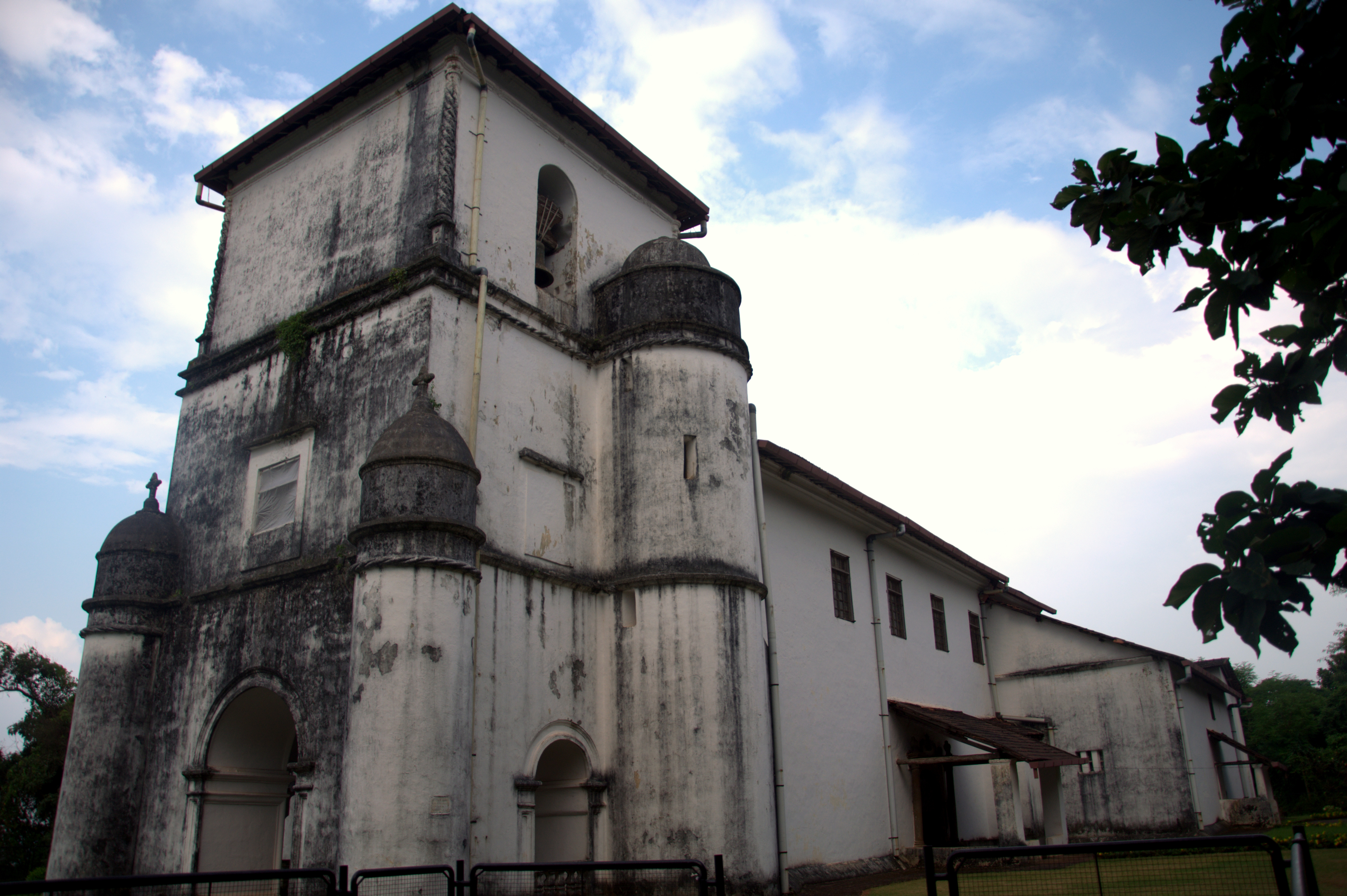
Church of Lady of Rosary

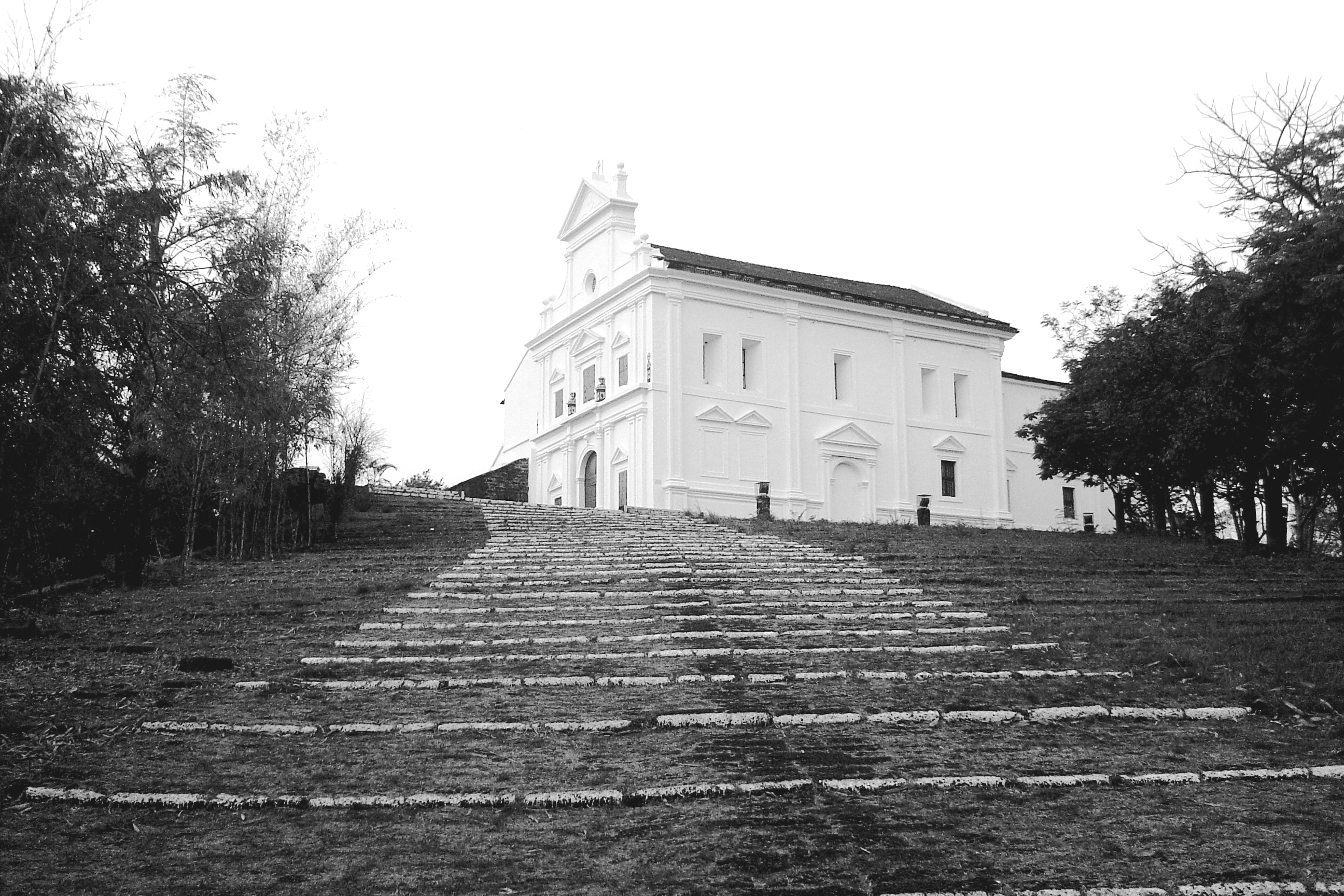
Chapel of Our Lady of the Mount

Church of Saint John of God

Royal Chapel of St. Anthony

== See also ==
- Pelourinho Novo
- Palace of the fortress
- Church of St. Anne, Talaulim
- Fort Bassein
- Damaon
- Velhas Conquistas
- Portuguese India
- Cumbarjua
