= Church of St. Anne, Talaulim =

Religious monument in India

Coordinates: 15.4781°N 73.8914°E

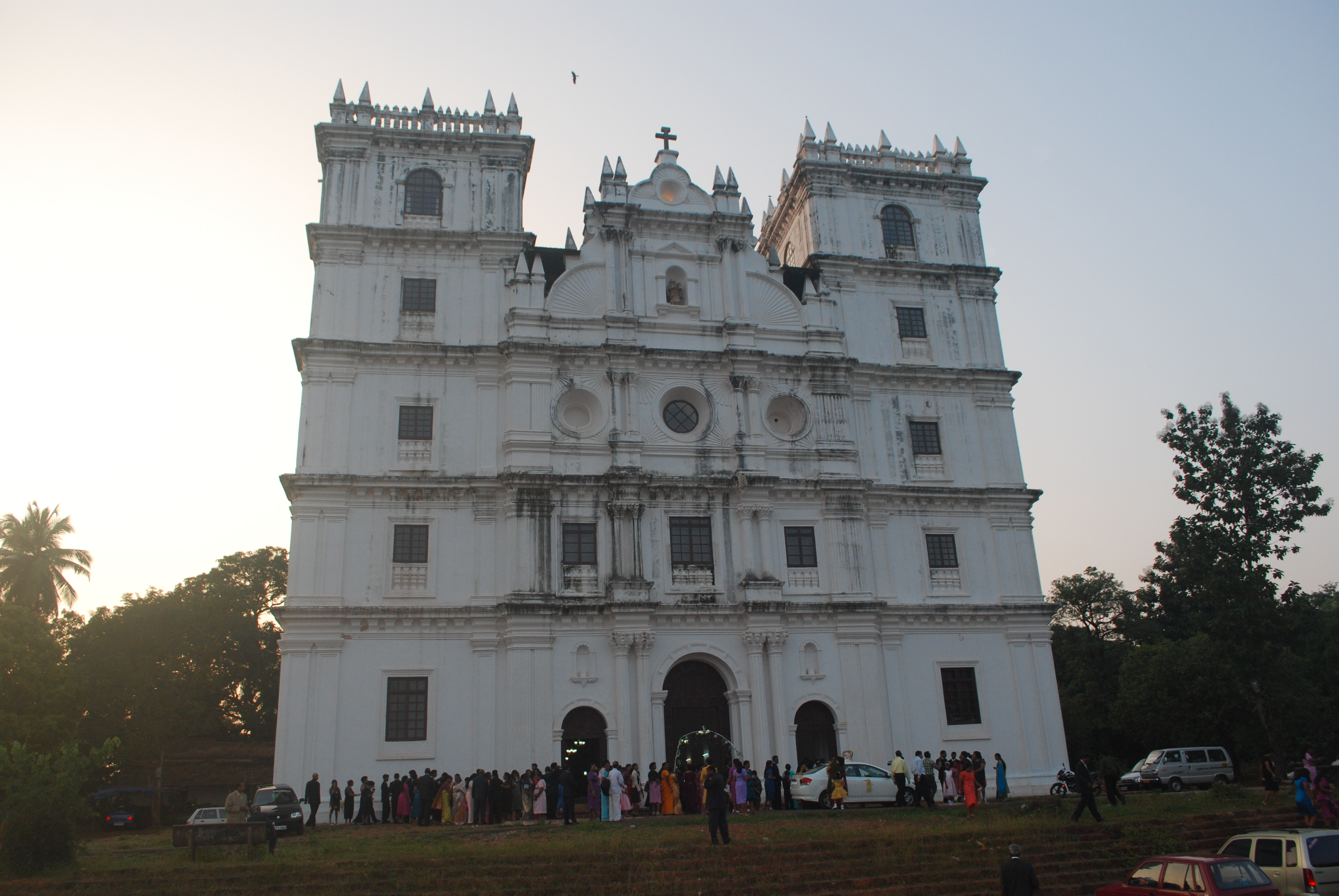
Church of St. Anne, Talaulim in Old Goa.

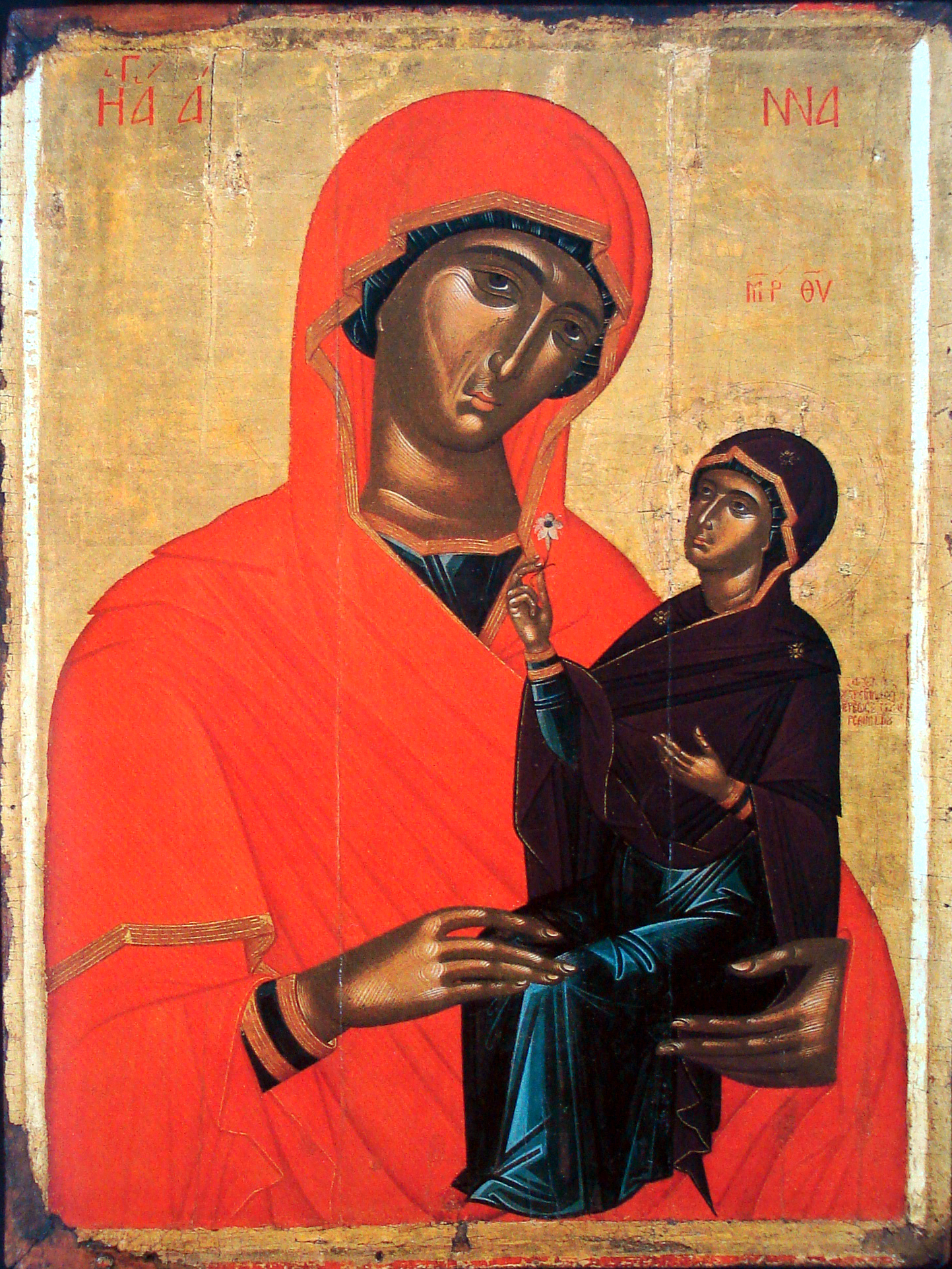
Saint Anne and Mary, by Angelos Akotantos

The Church of St. Anne is a church and religious monument located in the Santana district of Old Goa, in Goa province, India. The 17th century church is a major example of the colonial Portuguese Baroque architecture built in Portuguese India.

== History ==
Construction of the Church of St. Anne began in 1577 by Monsignor Francisco de Rego (1681–1689). It was completed in 1695, by his successor, Rev. Fr. Antonio Francisco da Cunha.

=== Landmark ===
The Church of Anne was declared a "national monument" during the Portuguese era per Government Portario No. 1360 of 31/3/31. In that Portario were also the Bom Jesus Basilica, the Se Cathedral, the Church of St. Francis of Assisi, the Convent of Santa Monica and the Church of St. Cajetan. Each of these, monumental in their architectural splendor, and all of them within the former Portuguese capital of Old Goa, Goa.

Upon Goa's annexation by India in 1961, while the aforementioned edifices were embraced as "national monuments" by the Archaeological Survey of India (ASI) and effectively taken over, the church of St. Anne was singularly overlooked and suffered the ravages of time and human neglect until parts of the structure were in precarious conditions.

The Church has been taken under the wing of the World Monument Foundation. Urgent repairs and the strengthening of the foundations took place in 2007 along with assistance from the Goa Government.

== Legends ==
Legend has it that while construction was in progress, an elderly villager by the name of Bartholomeu Marchon, had a vision of an old lady donning a hat with a staff in hand. The old lady ambled down the neighboring hill and promulgated to Bartholomeu that the Church under construction was her home, and that it was her intent to reside there. A similar apparition was also encountered by a Brahmin lady of high social standing, who happened to be gravely ill and almost in death's clutch. The celestial apparition anointed the lady with a miraculous cure and as a token of supreme gratitude, she embraced Christianity. Word of her miraculous cure percolated down to the village priest who instantly interpreted it as a sign of divine intervention, and without further ado, consecrated the church in honor of St. Anne.

High up in the transept facing the sanctuary, one can see a relief picture depicting the scene of St. Anne with a staff in hand and wearing a hat as seen in the apparitions..
