= Chapel of Our Lady of the Mount =

- Capela da Nossa Senhora do Monte
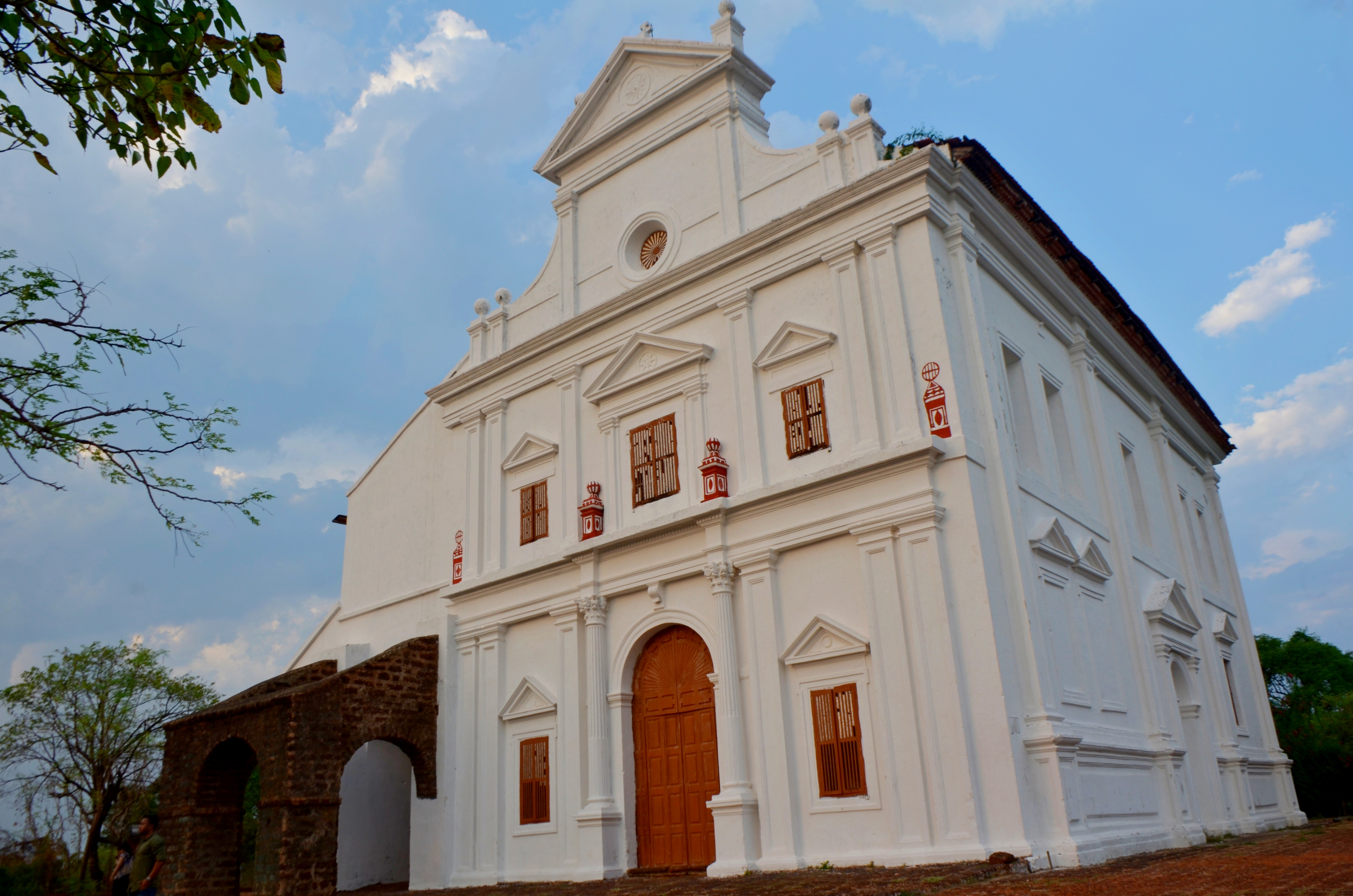

- Location within Goa Location within India
- 15.5045°N 73.9235°E
- Location: Old Goa, State of Goa
- Country: India
- Denomination: Roman Catholic

History
- Founder: Afonso de Albuquerque

Architecture
- Functional status: Non-functional
- Architectural type: Mannerist, Baroque
- Years built: 1510-1519

Administration
- Archdiocese: Archdiocese of Goa

The Chapel of Our Lady of the Mount is a Roman Catholic church dedicated to the Virgin Mary in Old Goa, India. It is one of the oldest churches in the city and was built between 1510 and 1519. The construction of the church was ordered by Afonso de Albuquerque, the governor of Portuguese India, immediately after the Portuguese conquest of Goa in 1510. The chapel was completed in 1519. After the fall of the city, the chapel fell into ruins and was only restored in the early 21st century by Fundação Oriente, a Portuguese organisation in Goa.

The chapel is located on a hill overlooking the Mandovi river, and is not easily accessible. It was built using laterite stone and the architectural style is Baroque with Mannerist influences. Every year in November, the chapel courtyard plays host to the popular Monte Music Festival.

Until 2001, the chapel was in ruins. A restoration project was then planned and funded by the Fundação Oriente, an organisation that maintains cultural links of Goa and Damaon with Portugal, in association with the state government.

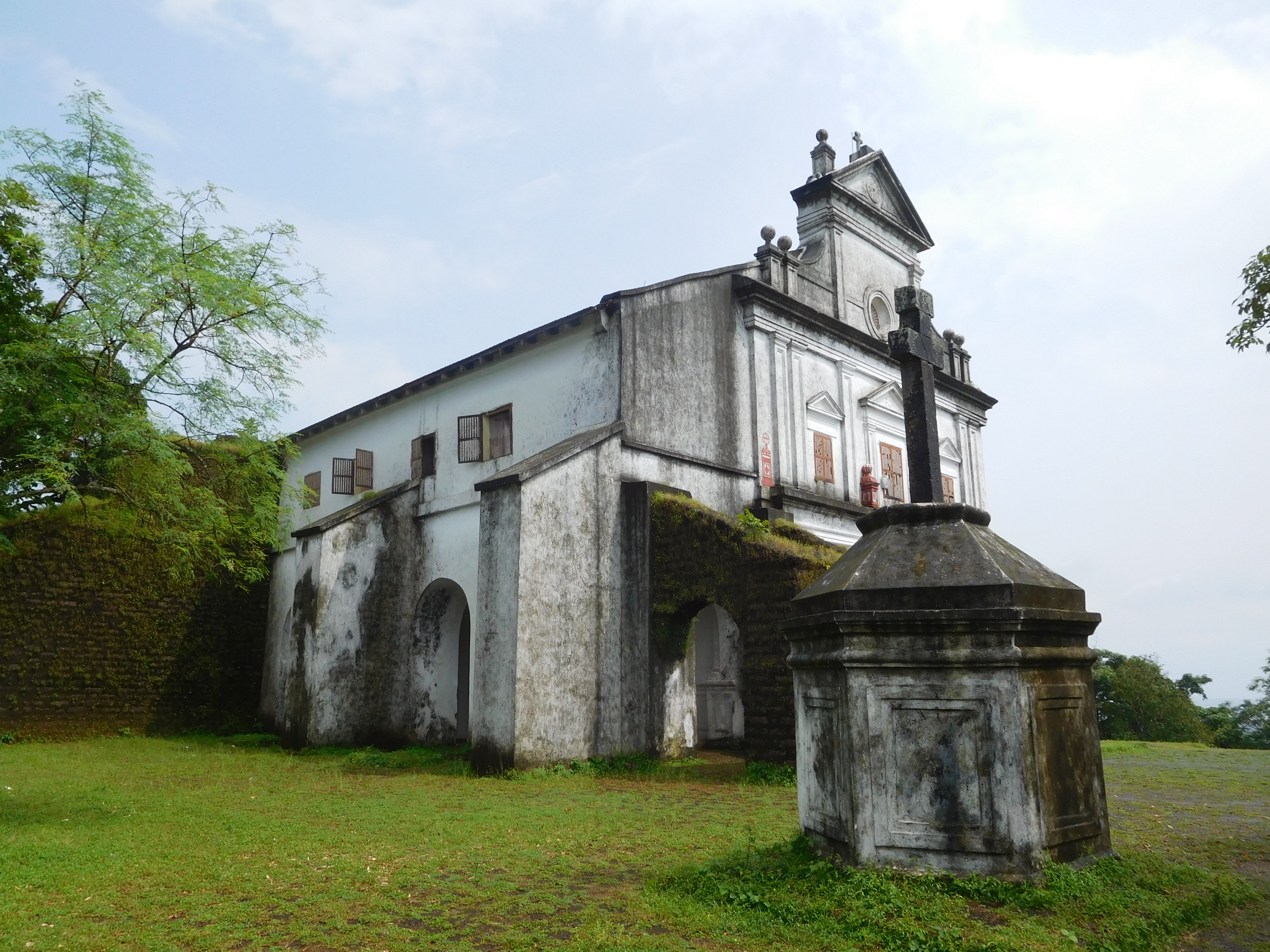
The church before restoration.
