= George Moraes =

George Moraes may refer to:

- George Moraes (field hockey), Ugandan field hockey player
- George M. Moraes, Indian historian, author, and professor
