= Basilica of Bom Jesus =

Catholic basilica in Old Goa, India

- Basílica do Bom Jesus (Portuguese)
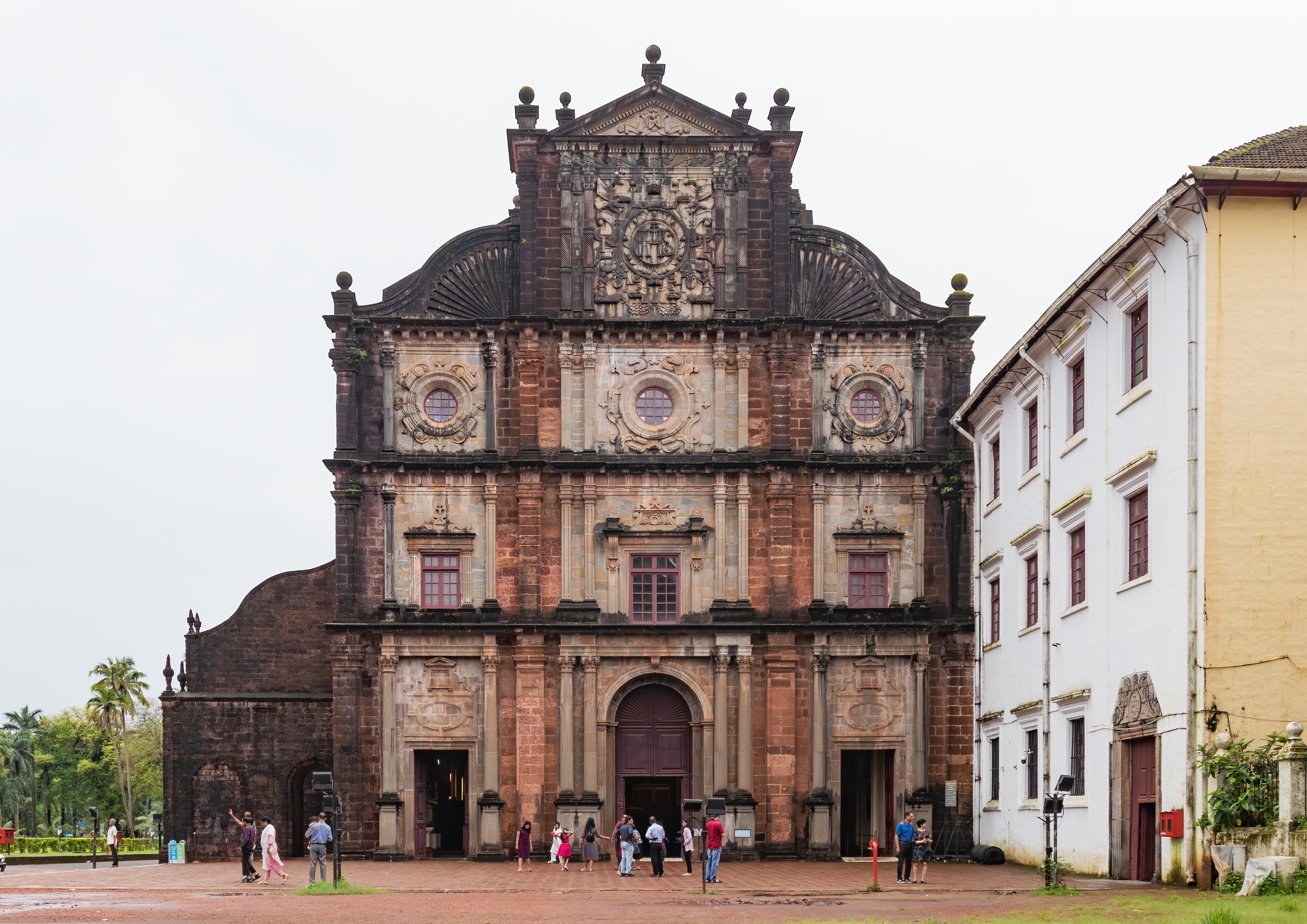
- Front of the Basilica of Bom Jesus
- Basilica of Bom Jesus
- 15°30′3.14″N 73°54′41.44″E
- Location: Old Goa, Goa
- Country: India
- Denomination: Catholic Church
- Sui iuris church: Latin Church
- Website: stfrancisxavierofficial.com

Architecture
- Functional status: Active
- Architectural type: Basilica
- Style: Baroque architecture, Portuguese colonial architecture
- Groundbreaking: 1594; 432 years ago
- Completed: 1605; 421 years ago

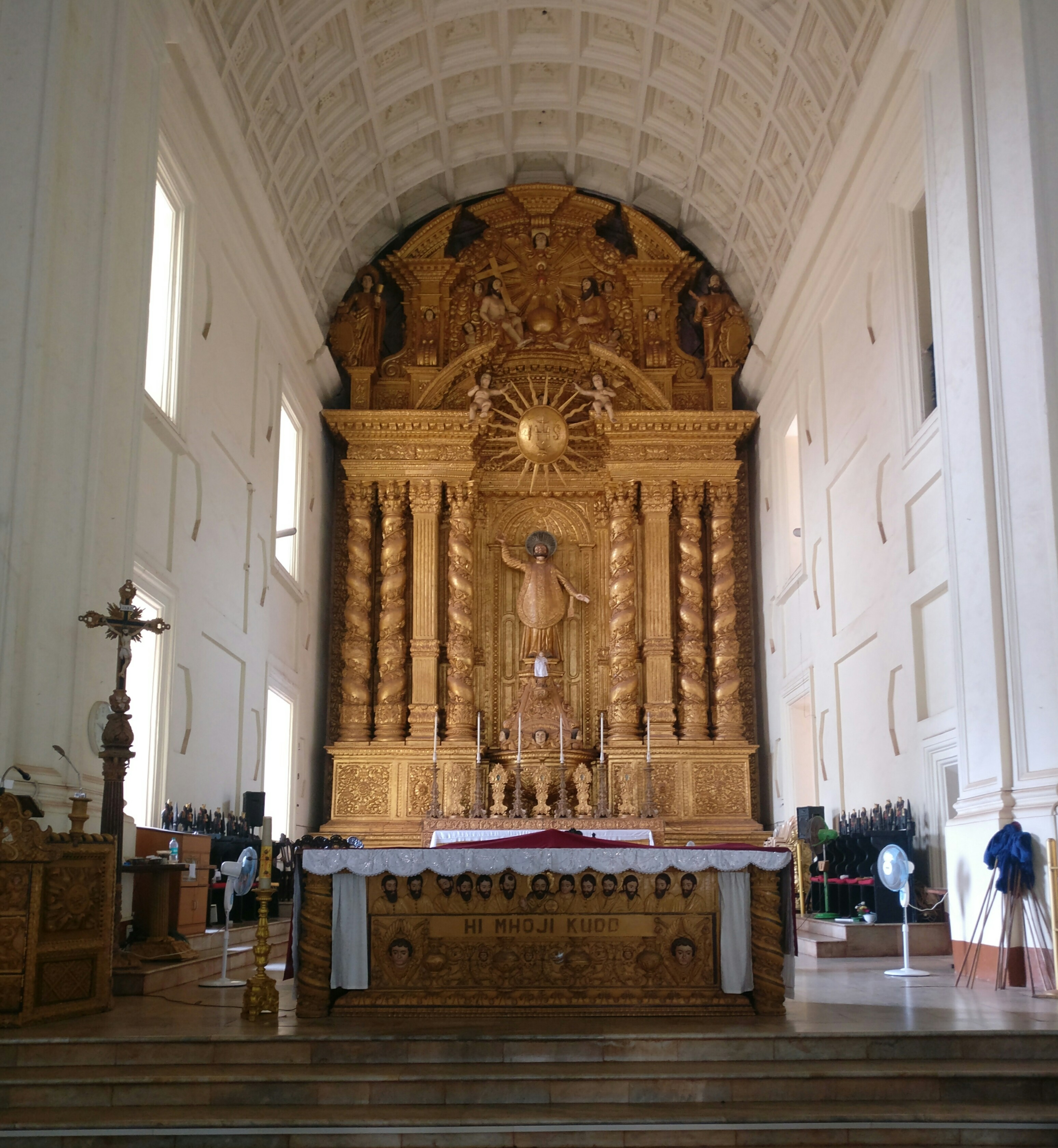
The Baroque style main altar has a statue of Ignatius of Loyola.

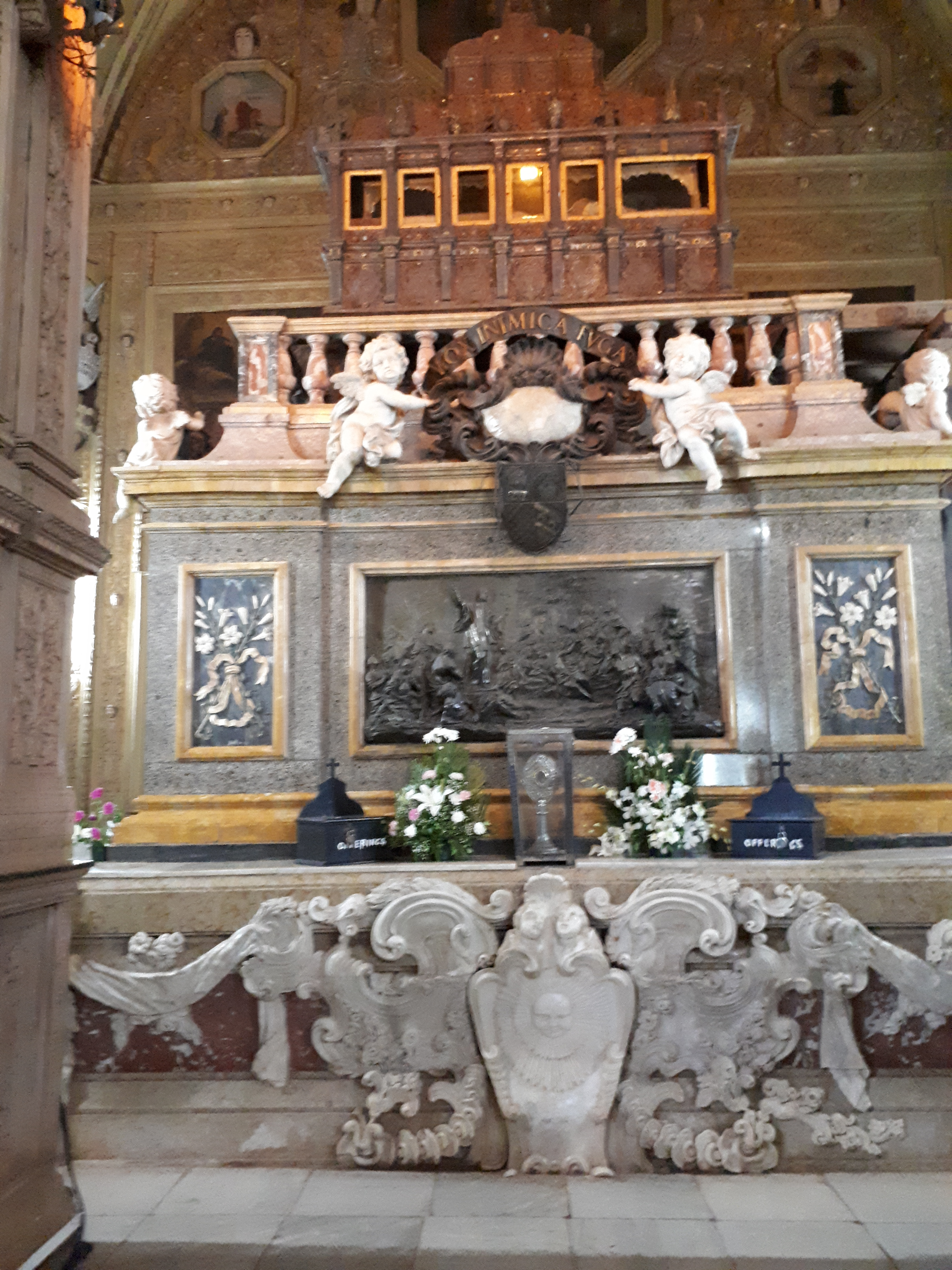
Location of Francis Xavier's corpse, which is brought down once every 10 years.

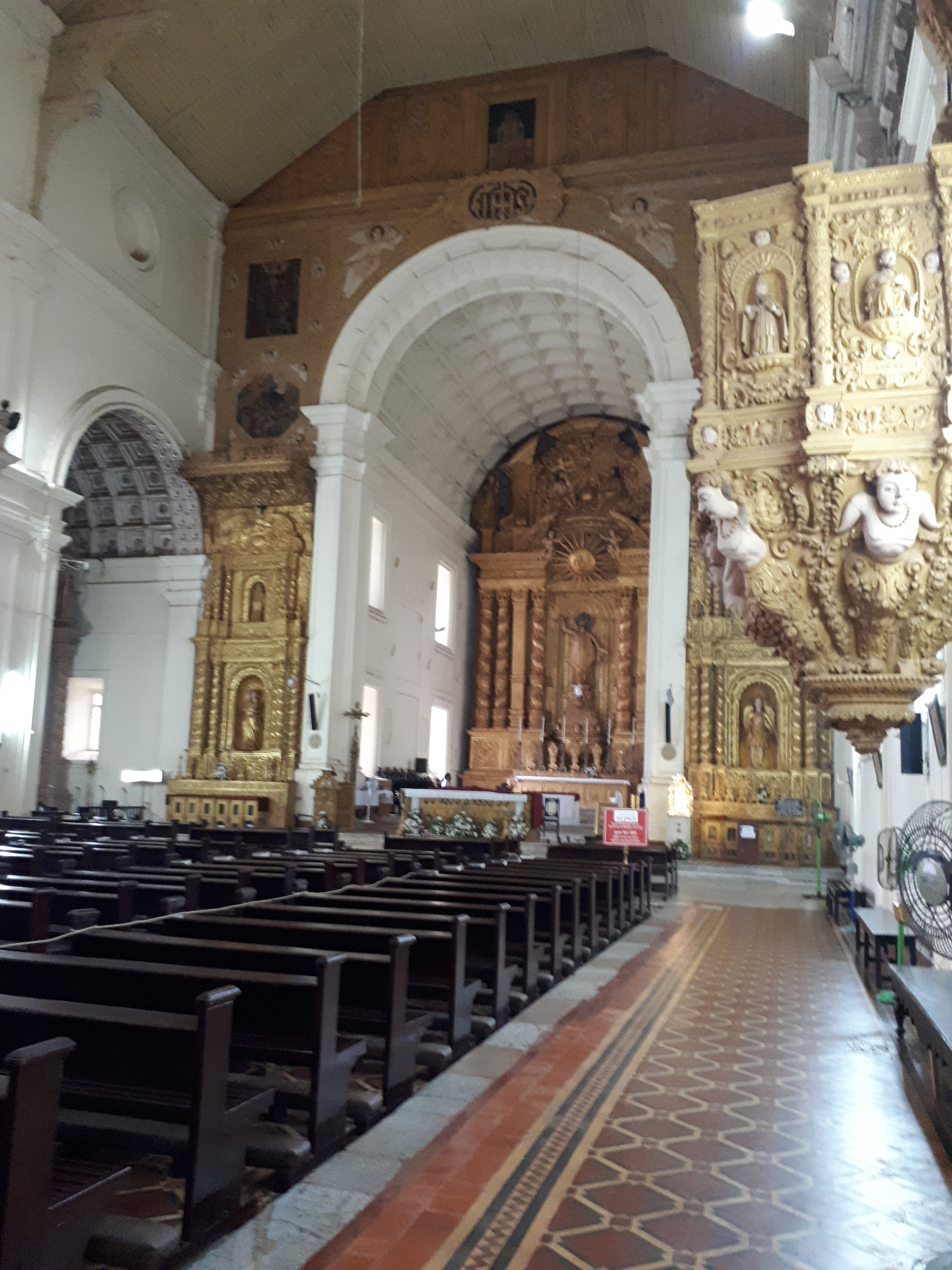
Interior of the Basilica

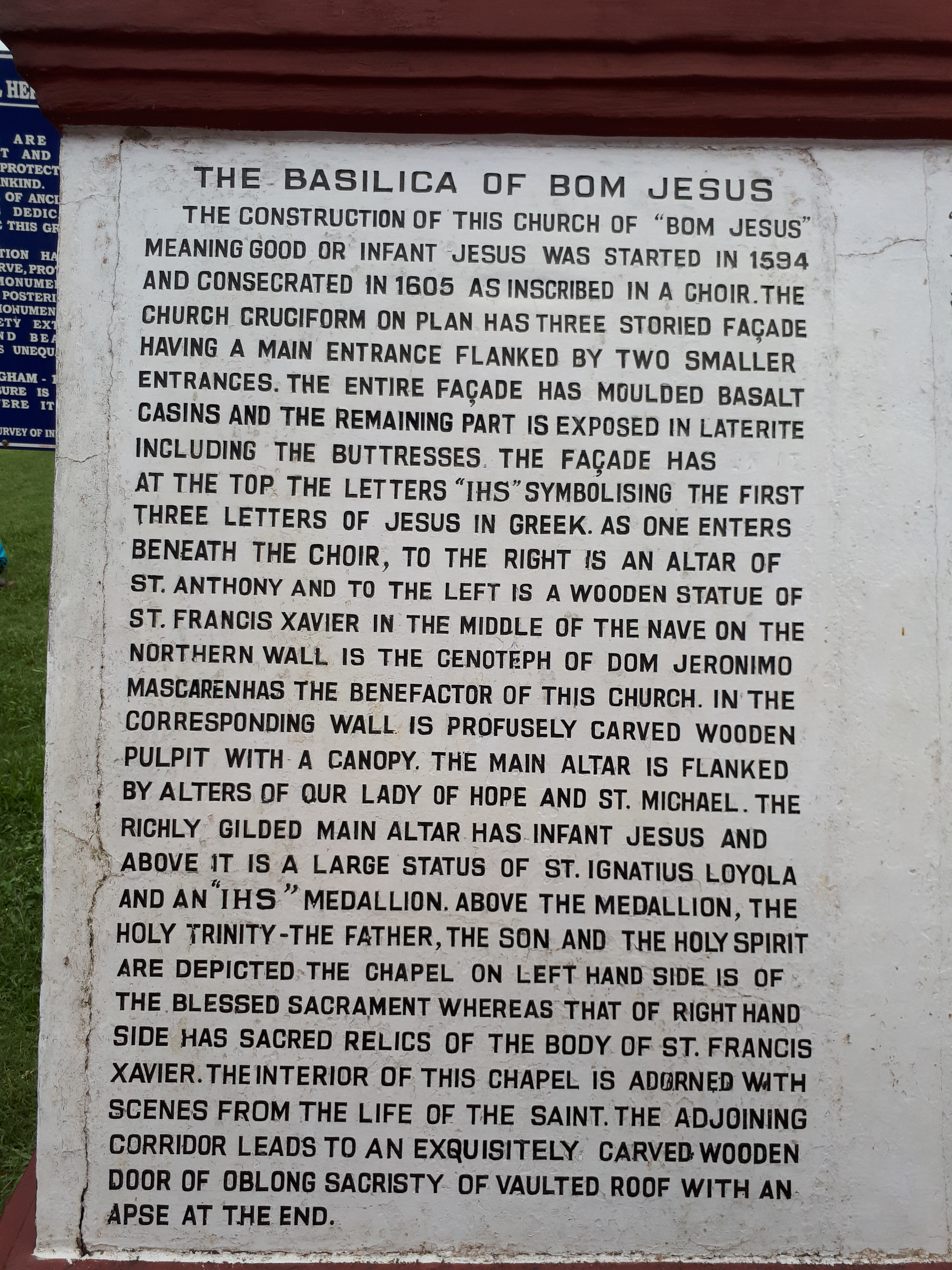
The rock carving at the entrance

The Basilica of Bom Jesus (Portuguese: Basílica do Bom Jesus; Goan Konkani: Borea Jezuchi Bajilika) is a Catholic basilica in Goa, in the Konkan region of India. The church is a pilgrimage centre and recognised by UNESCO as a World Heritage Site. The basilica is located in Old Goa, the former capital of Portuguese India, and holds the body of St Francis Xavier.

Bom Jesus (meaning, "Good Jesus" in Portuguese) is the name used for the Ecce Homo in Portuguese speaking countries. It is one of the Seven Wonders of Portuguese Origin in the World. It was made a basilica in the pontifical decree “Priscam Goae” on 20 March 1946.

== History ==
Construction work on the church began in 1594. The church was consecrated in May 1605 by the archbishop, Aleixo de Menezes. This world heritage monument has emerged as a landmark in the history of Christianity. It contains the Catholic saint Francis Xavier's body.

The Basilica and its outbuildings were the venue for the 2nd National Eucharistic Congress whose attendees included the Bishop of Dhaka, Peter Joseph Hurth.

Architectural historian Vishvesh Prabhakar Kandolkar's 2025 book Goa's Bom Jesus as Visual Culture: The Basilica's Architecture, Image, History and Identity chronicles the long history of this church. As Kandolkar and others note, the church is in need of significant intervention to maintain its structural upkeep.

== Gallery ==
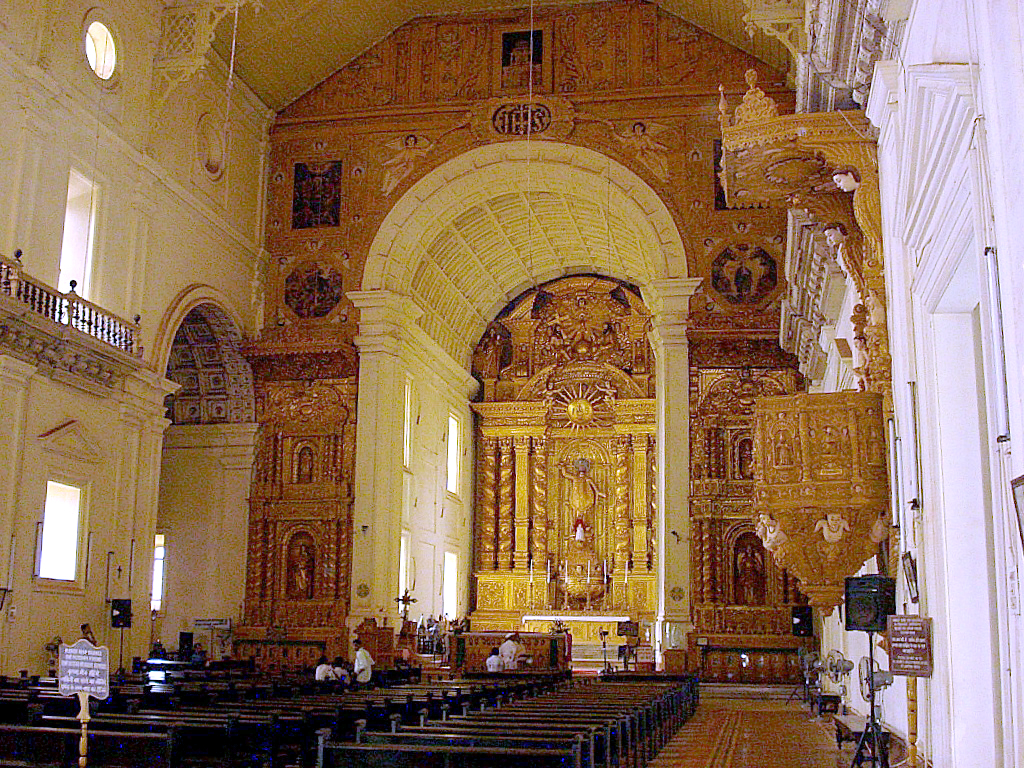
Interior view towards altar

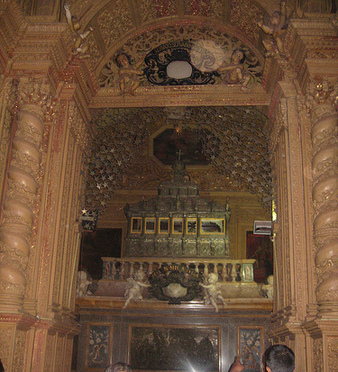
Relics of St. Francis Xavier

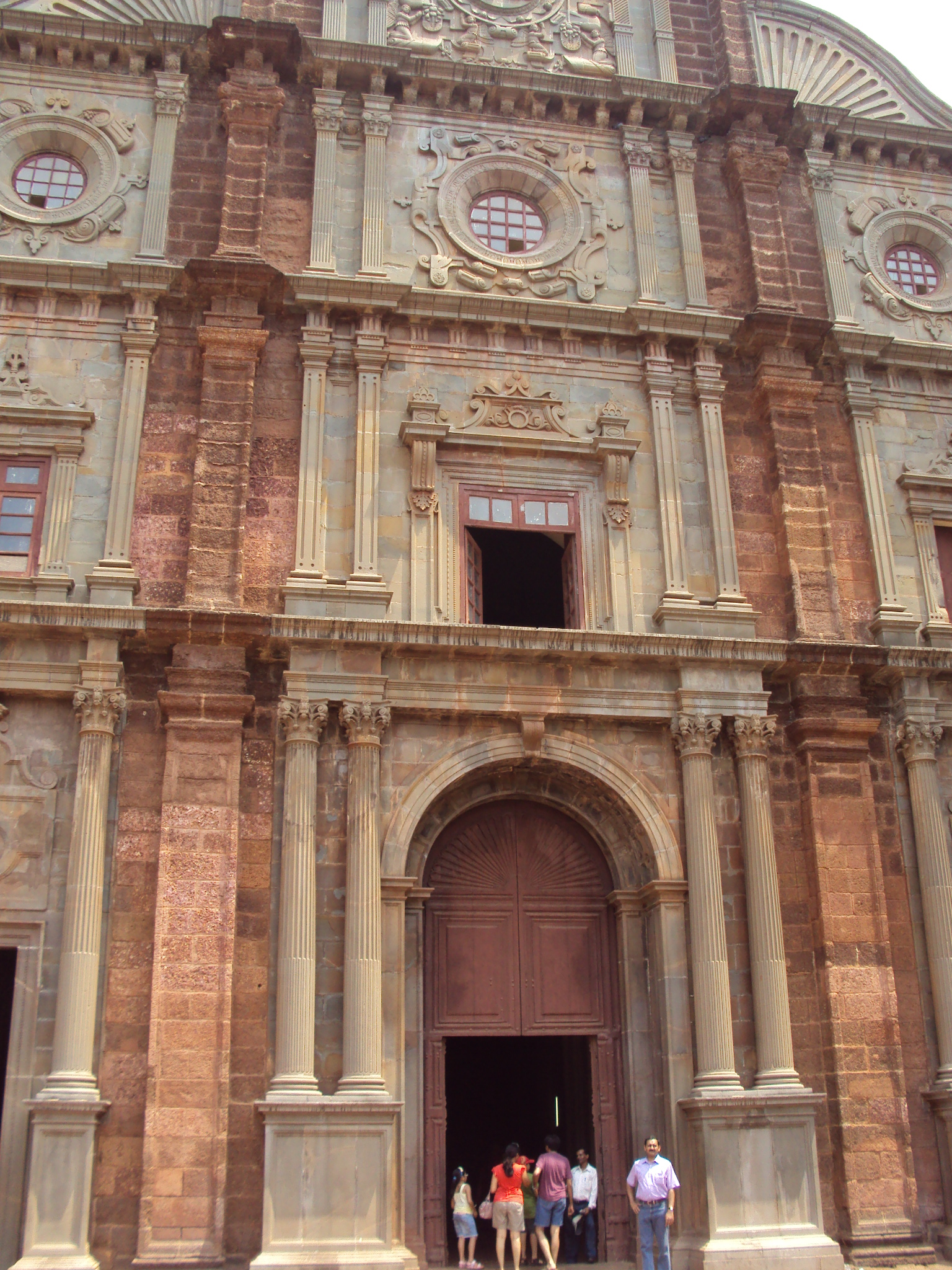
The ornamented entrance to the church

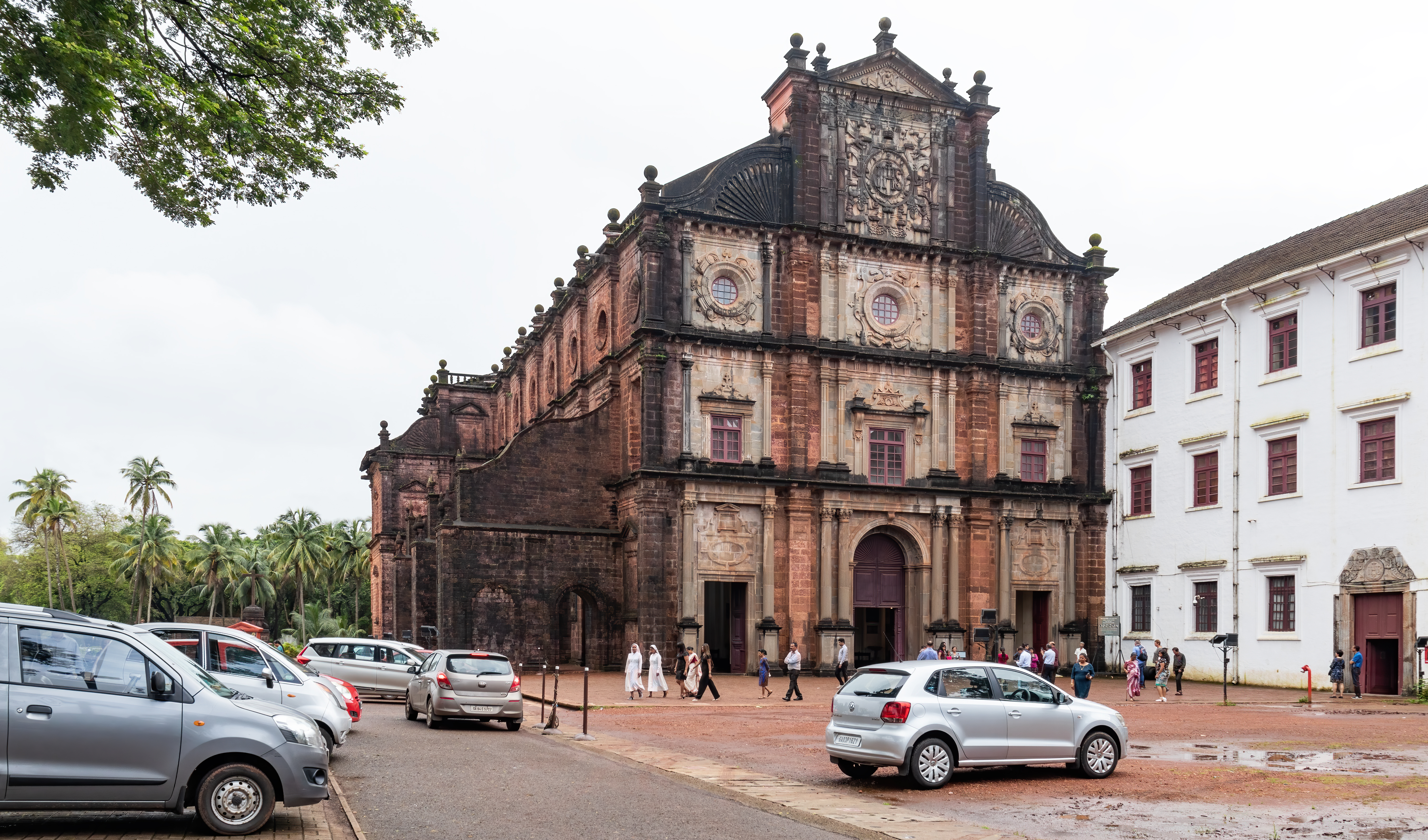
Basilica of Bom Jesus, Goa

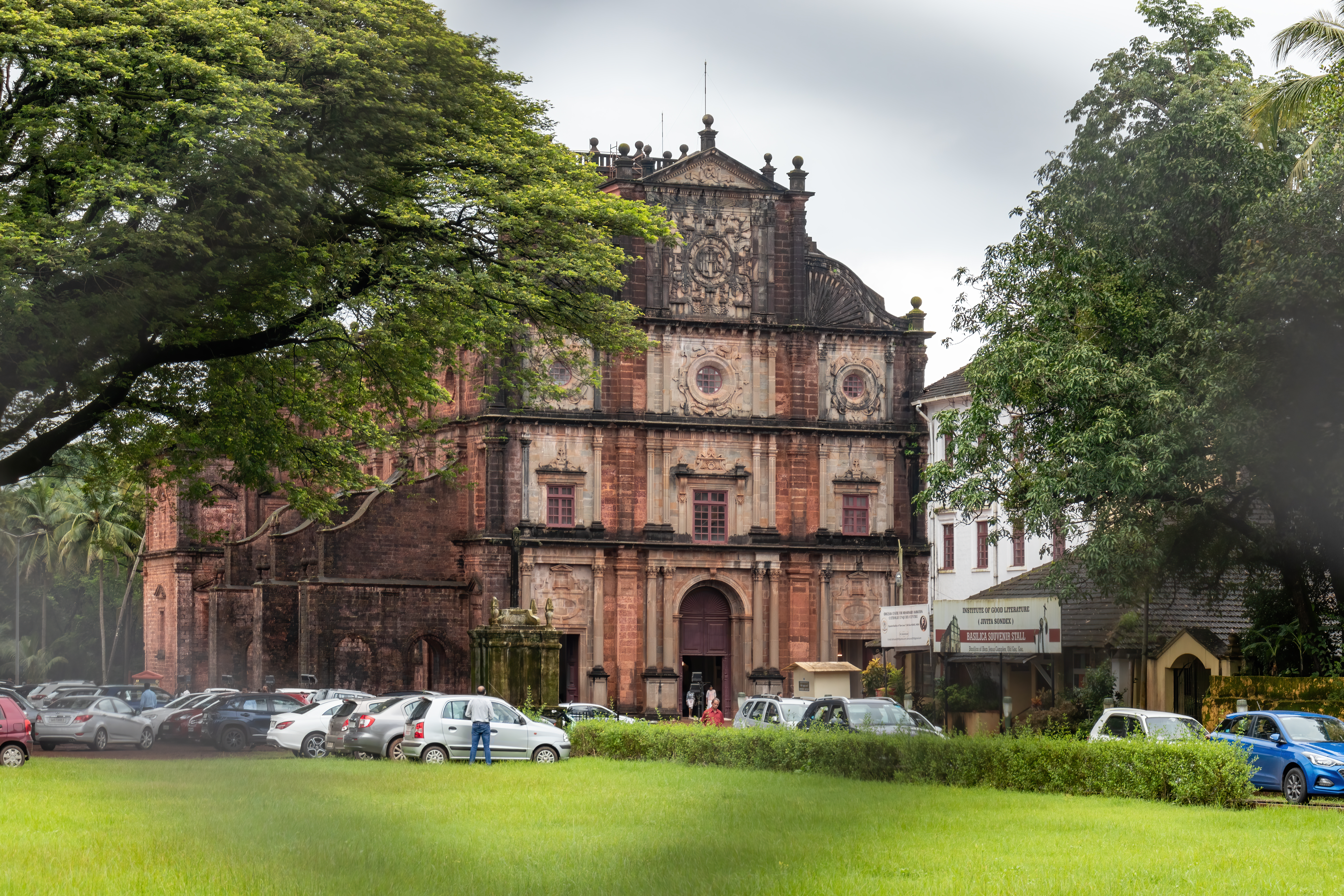
Basilica of Bom Jesus-View from the entrance

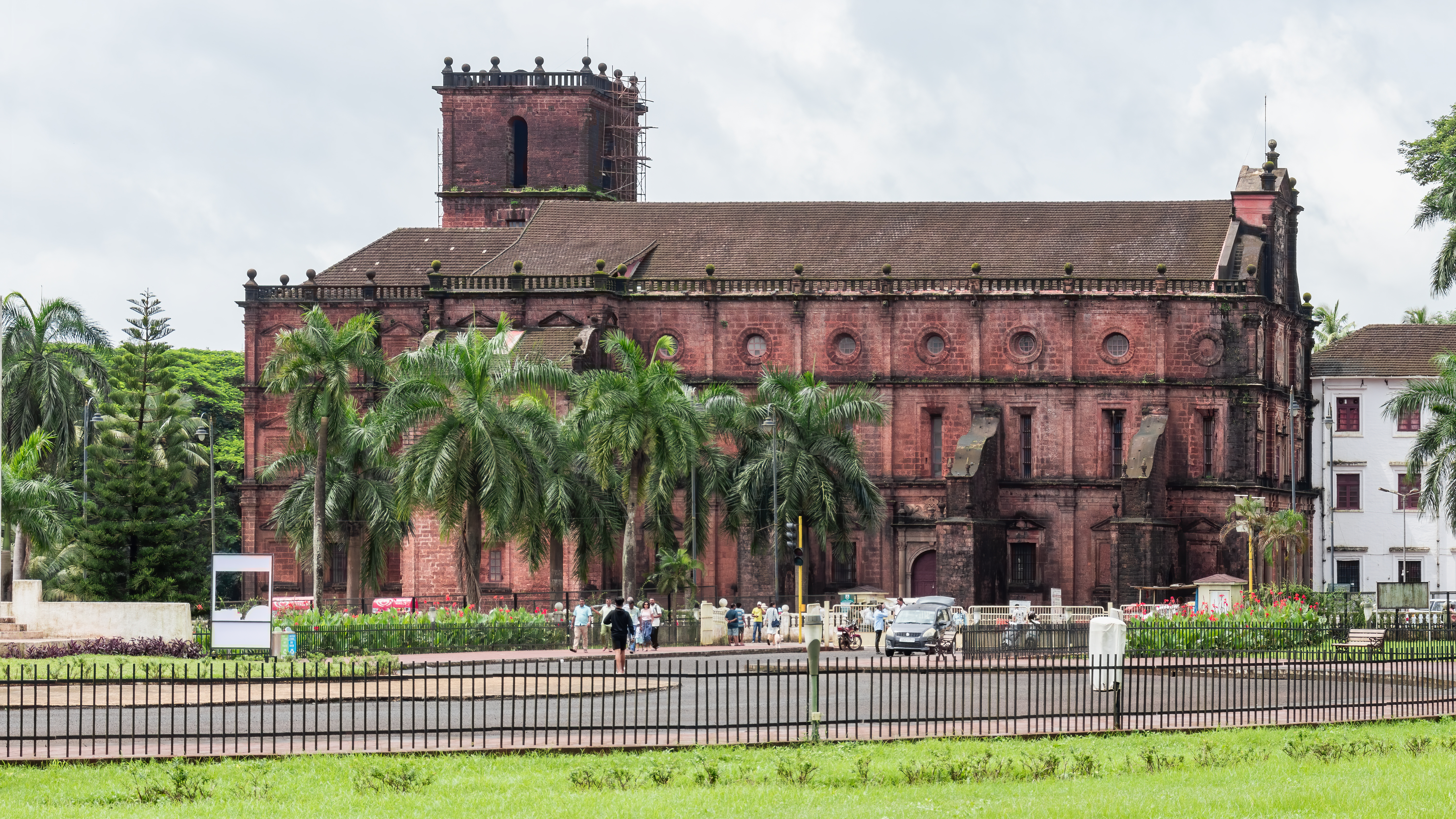
View from the Se Chathedral

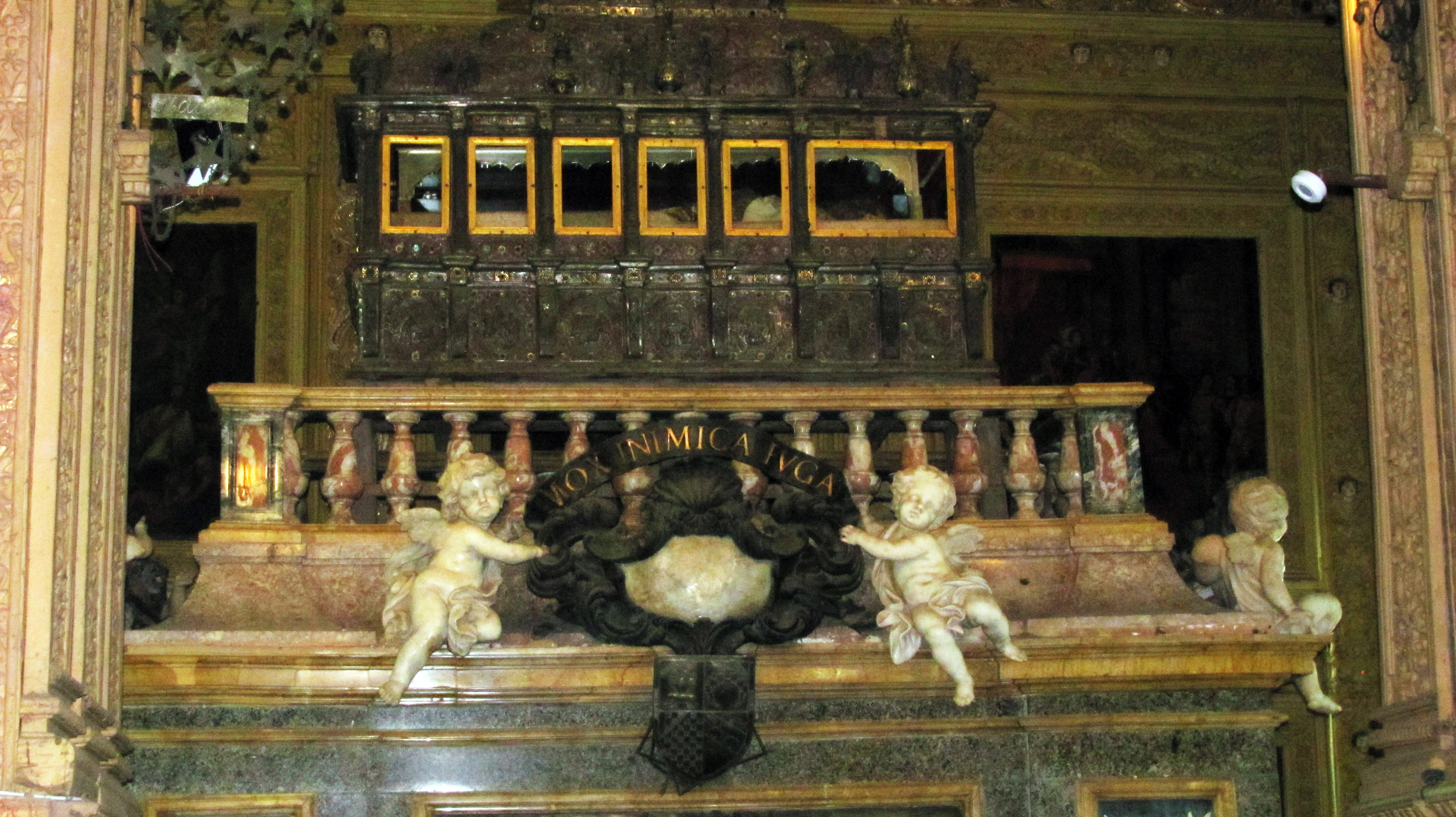
Mortal remains of St. Francis Xavier

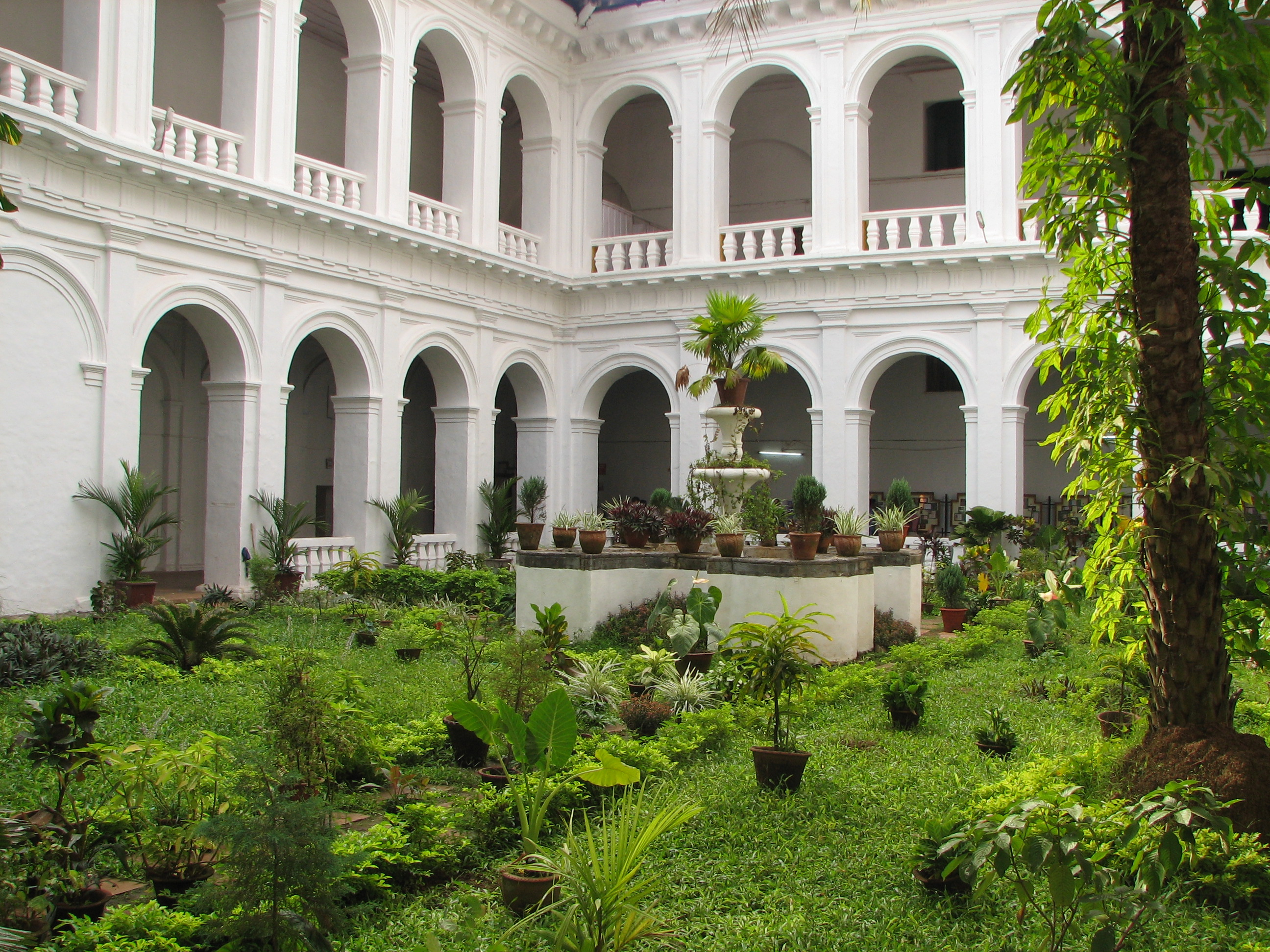
Inside courtyard

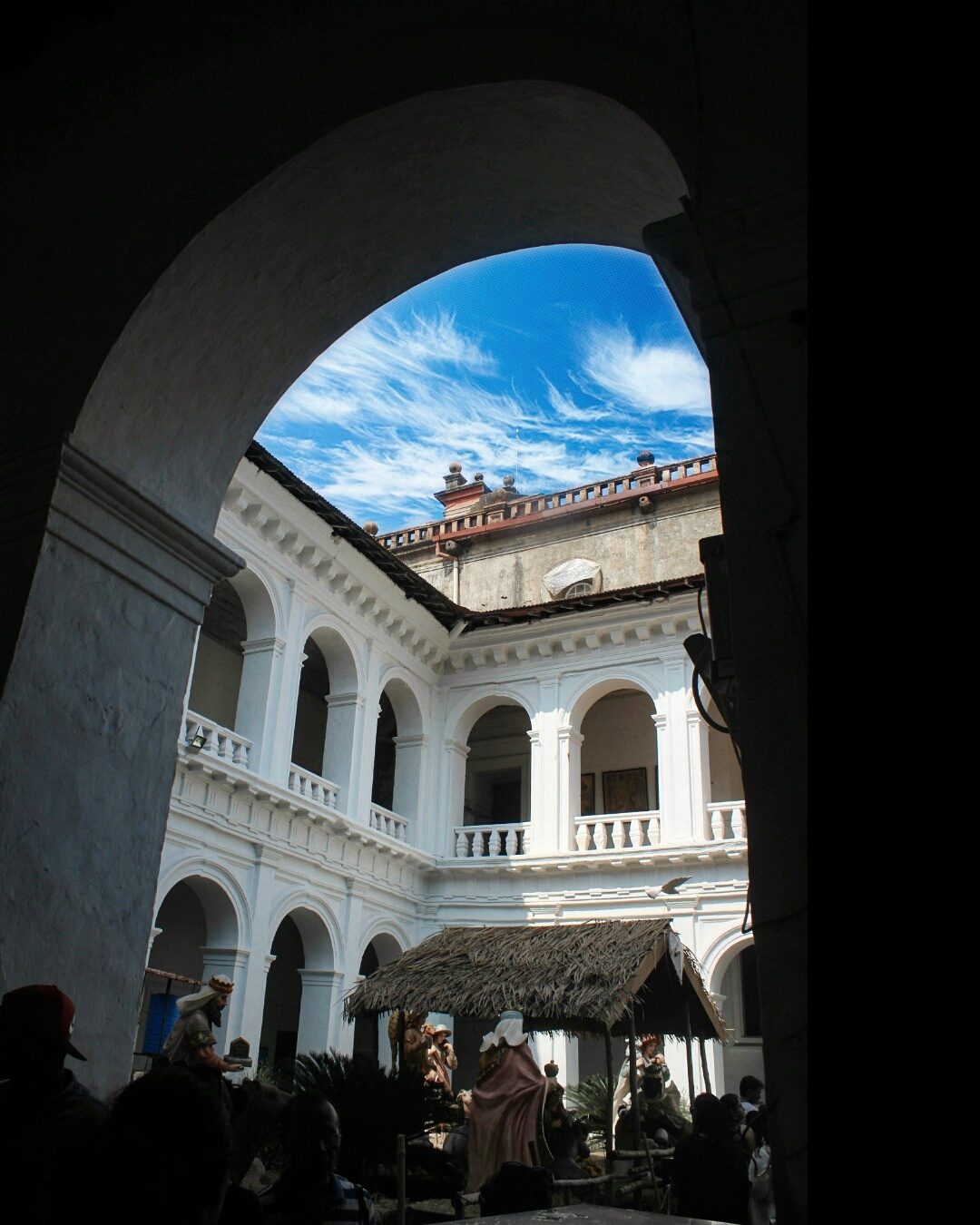
Basilica of Bon Jesus inside the courtyard

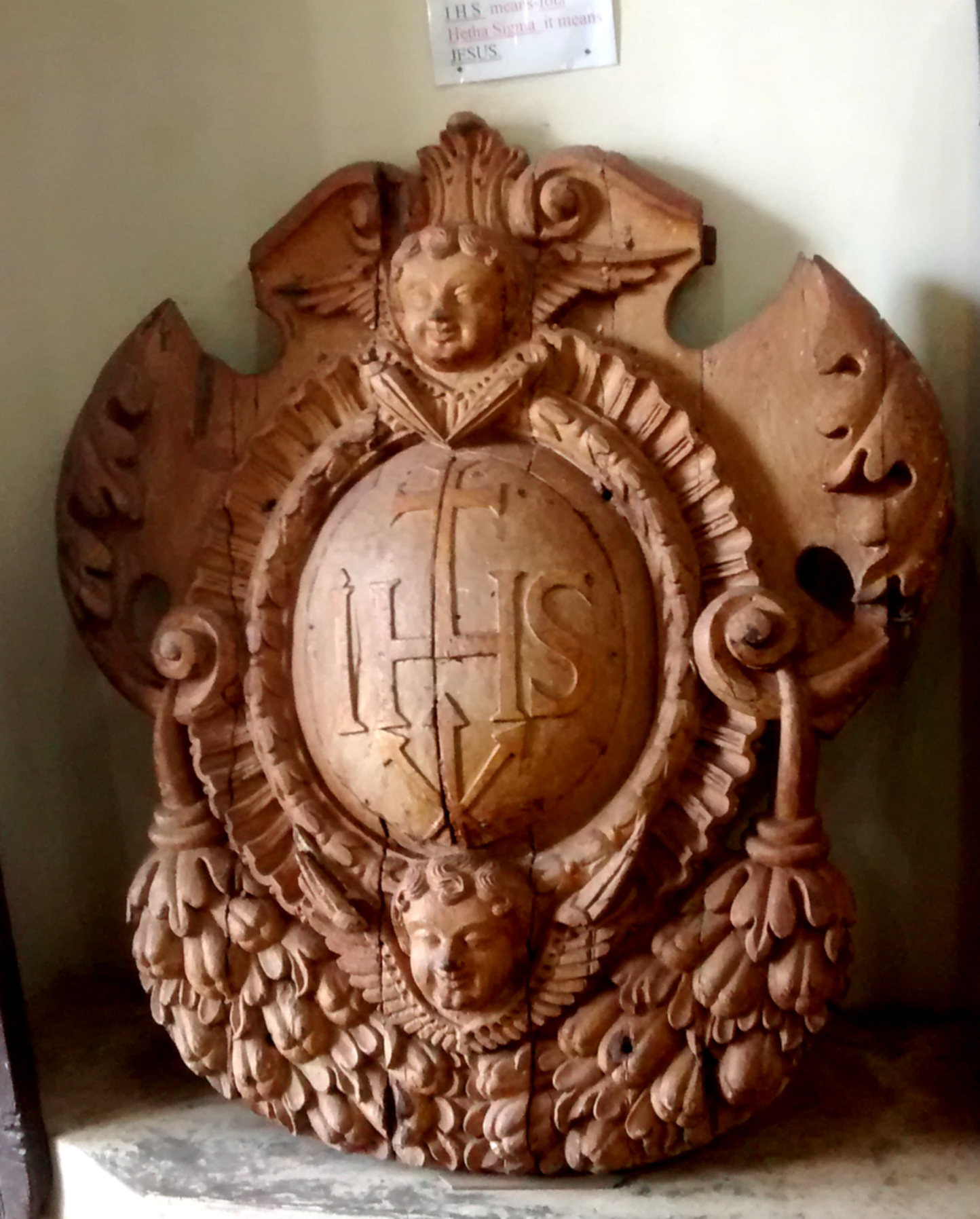
An exhibit in the art gallery

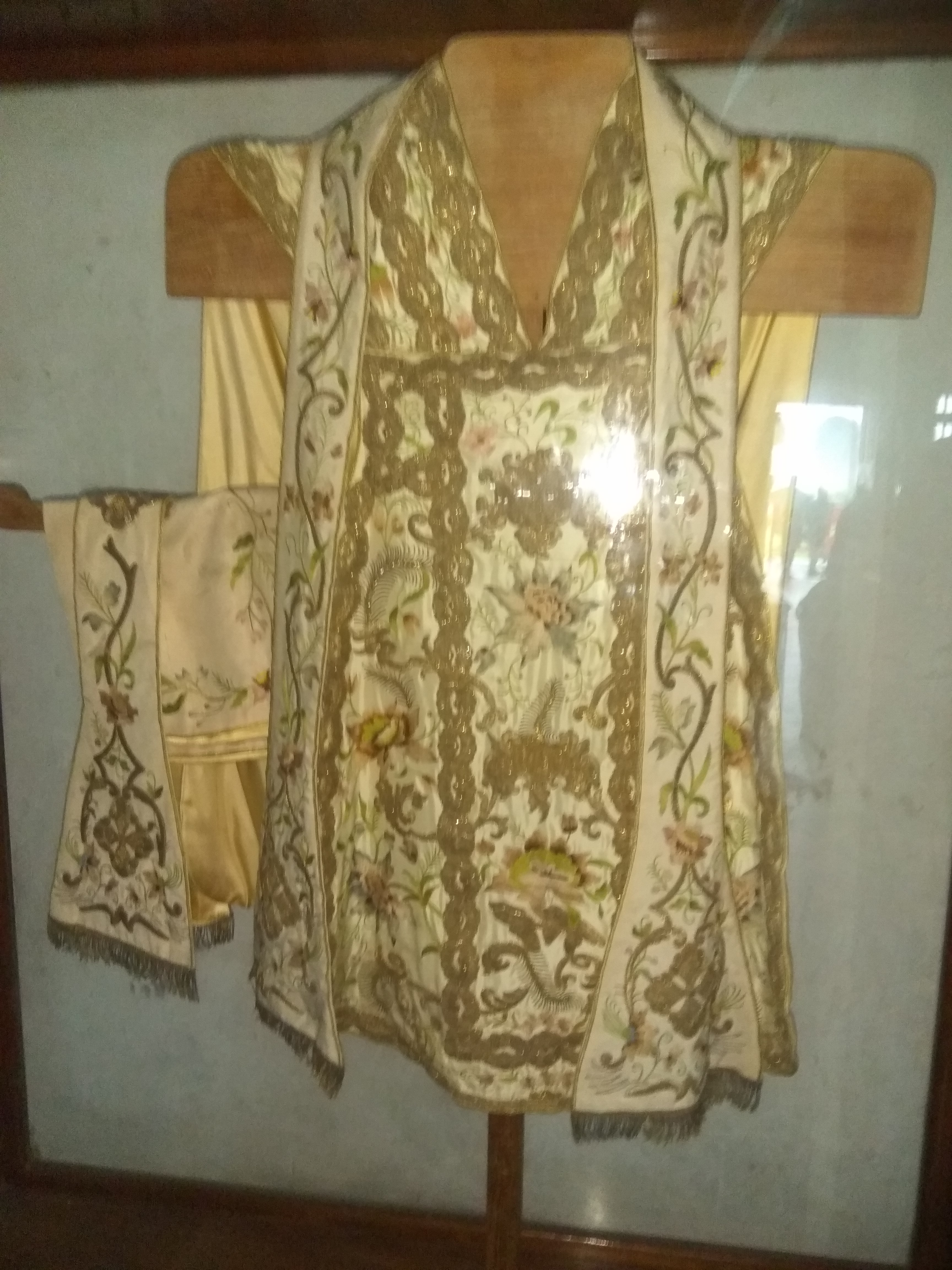
St. Francis Xavier's Vestments

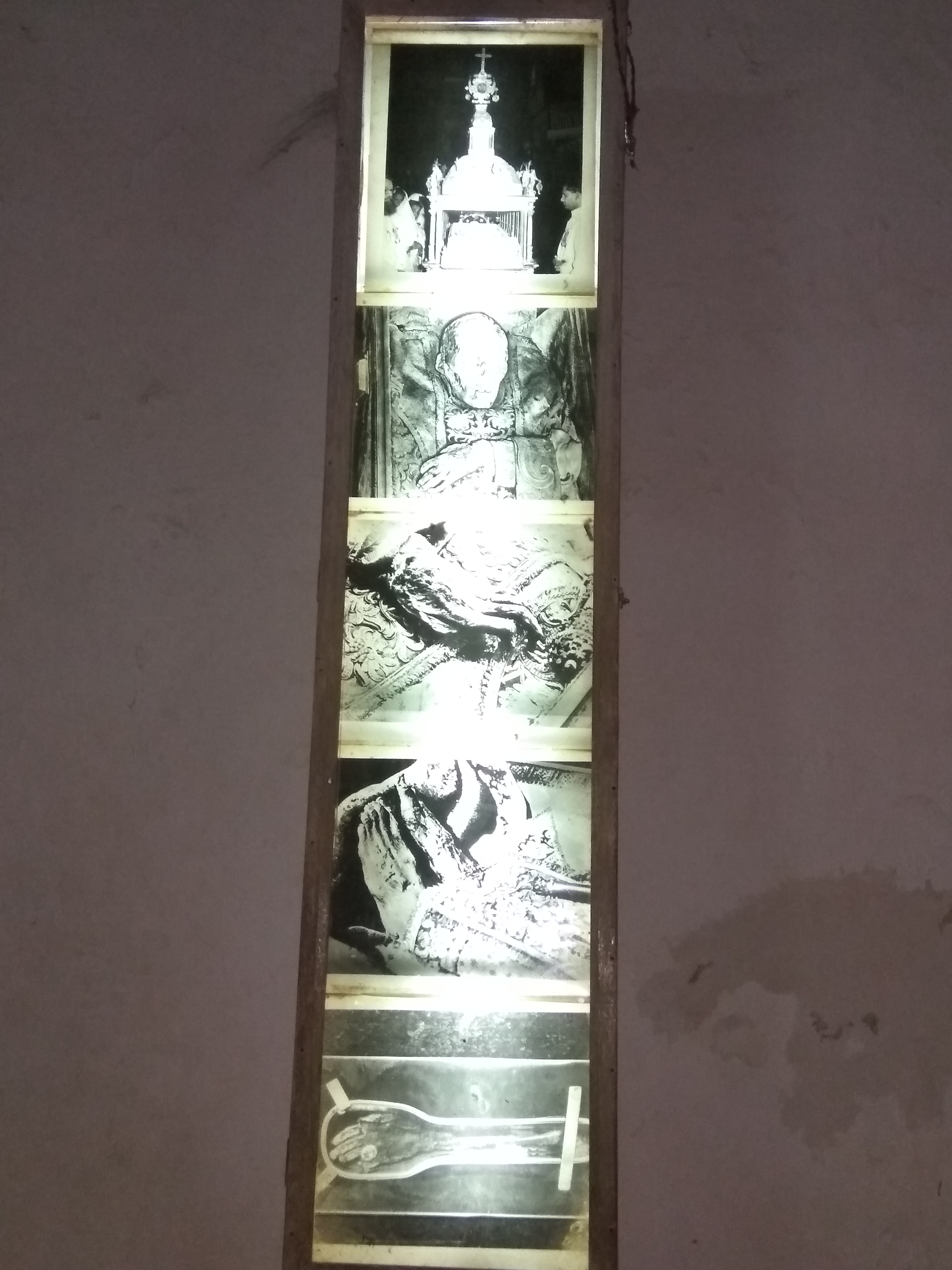
Relic of St. Francis Xavier

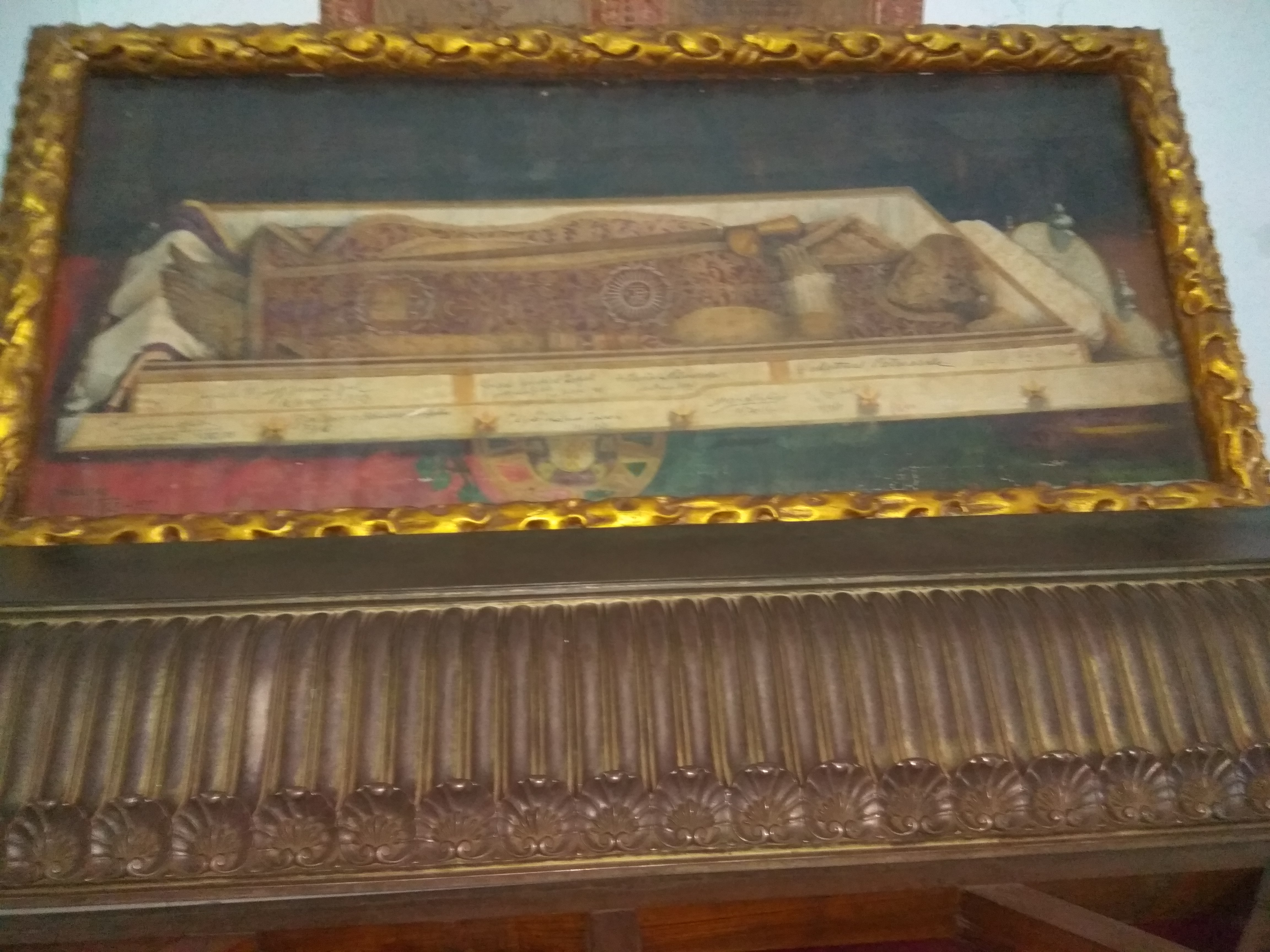
Mortal remains of St. Francis Xavier

== See also ==
- Se Cathedral
- Ecce Homo
- List of Jesuit sites
