= Goa Velha =

- Town
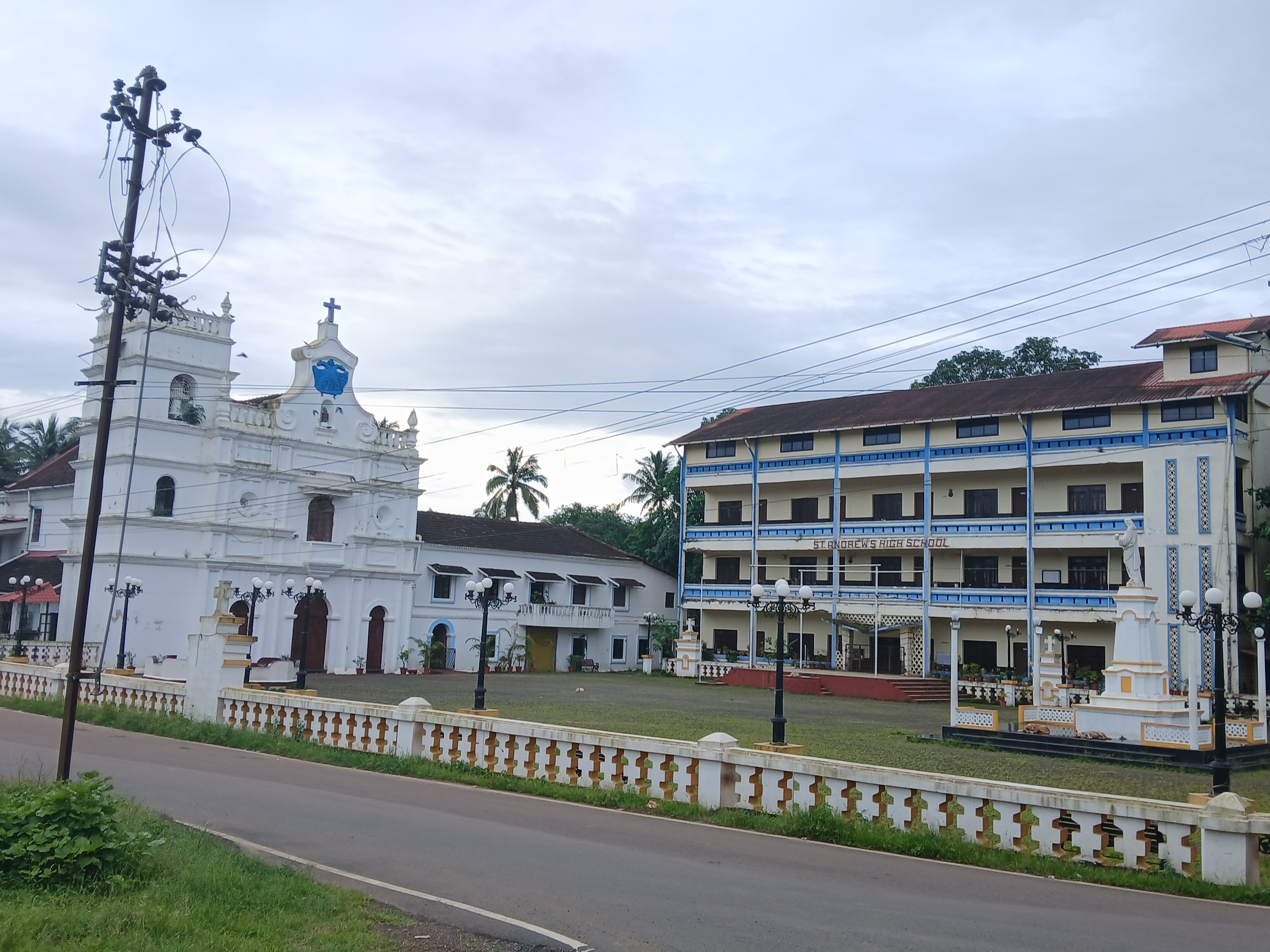
- Saint Andrew's Church and School

- Location within Goa Location within India
- Coordinates: 15.444°N 73.881°E
- Country: India
- State: Goa
- District: North Goa
- Sub District: Ilhas
- Established: 1510
- Founder: Afonso de Albuquerque
- Named for: "Goa - The Old" in Portuguese

Government

Area
  - Total: 6.20 km^{2} (2.39 sq mi)
- Elevation: 6 m (20 ft)

Population (2011)
  - Total: 4,322
  - Density: 697/km^{2} (1,810/sq mi)

Languages
  - Official: Konkani
  - Also Spoken (understood): English
  - Historical: Portuguese

Religions
  - Dominant: Roman Catholicism
  - Minor: Hinduism
  - Historical: Roman Catholicism
- Time zone: UTC+5:30 (IST)
- Postcode: 403108
- Telephone Code: 0832

Goa Velha is a small town in Ilhas de Goa subdistrict, Goa state, India. It should not be confused with the World Heritage Site of the historical city of Old Goa (Portuguese: Velha Goa). St Andrew's Church is its parish church.

It is well known for its yearly 'Procession of the Saints' (Konkani: Santanchem Pursanv). The traditional takes place on the fifth monday of the Lent, every year.

== History ==
The town of Goa Velha was a southern suburb of the City of Goa, which was the original capital of Portuguese India. The Plagues of Goa in the 16th and 18th century gradually brought about the decline in the city's population. Goa Velha was one of the few areas on the Ilhas de Goa where populations of people began to cluster around. Velha Goa was once as vibrant as London or Lisbon with a population of more than 200,000. Then a disaster struck, and over the course of the next two centuries, the magnificent city was reduced to a shadow of its past.

In the 15th century, the Bijapur Sultanate built Velha Goa on the banks of Mandovi river. But once the Portuguese defeated Adil Shah in 1510 CE and took over the city, it served as the administrative seat of the Portuguese in India.

However, when plague and cholera epidemics started to ravage the city, people began to move out, and by 1775 only 1,500 people remained. This abandoned city came to be known as Velha Goa (Old Goa) to distinguish it from the new capital Nova Goa (New Goa - Panjim).

== Geography ==
Goa Velha is located adjacent to Pilar in Ilhas, North Goa. By road it is approximately 2.5 kilometres north-west of Agaçaim, 12 kilometres south-east of the capital Panjim, 17 kilometres north-east of Vasco da Gama, and 26 kilometres north of the South Goa district headquarters Margão.Goa Velha is a coastal village located in the North Goa district of Goa, India. It is situated near the Mandovi Mandovi River, offering scenic views and a mix of lush greenery and sandy beaches. The area features a combination of low-lying coastal terrain and hilly regions, typical of Goa's landscape. It has a rich historical background, with colonial architecture and significant cultural sites. The climate is tropical, with a distinct wet season during the monsoons.

== Demographics ==
=== Population ===
As of the 2011 census of India, Goa Velha had a population of 4,322 . Males constitute 53% of the population and females 47%.

=== Literacy ===
Goa Velha has an average literacy rate of 89.17%, higher than the state average of 88.70%: male literacy is 82%, and female literacy is 71%. In Goa Velha, 9% of the population is under 6 years of age.

=== Religion ===
68.12% of the population is Christian, 27.97% is Hindu and 3.77% is Muslim.

Goa Velha Census Town has total administration over 1,055 houses to which it supplies basic amenities like water and sewerage. It is also authorized to build roads within Census Town limits and impose taxes on properties coming under its jurisdiction.
