= Rua Direita =

Main street of the former Portuguese city of Goa (Old Goa), India

- Rua dos Leilões
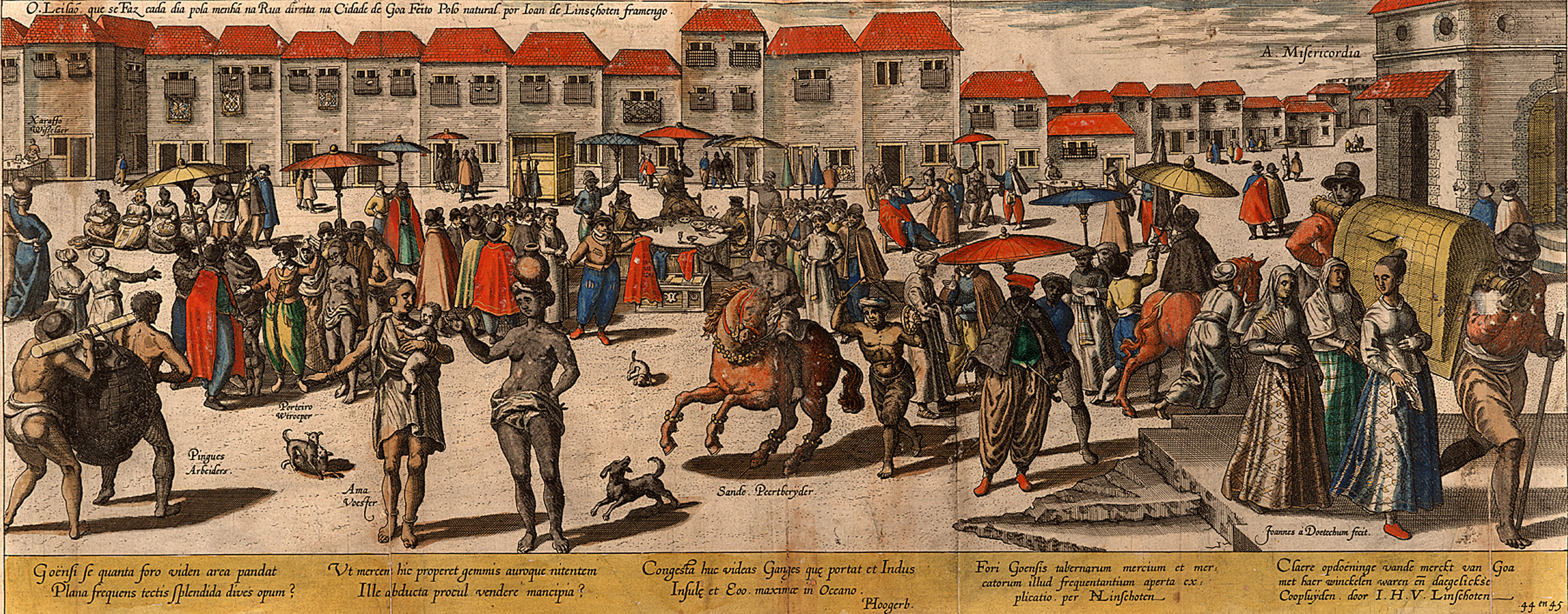
- Rua Direita in Goa by Jan Huygen van Linschoten, 1596
- Type: Historic street
- Length: Approximately 0.5 km
- Location: City of Goa, Goa, India
- From: Quay of the Viceroys, Palace of the Fortress
- To: Southern gate (Bacais) near Misericórdia Square

Other
- Known for: Main commercial, ceremonial and institutional street of the Portuguese city of Goa

The Rua Direita (Rua Direita, "Straight Street") was the main street of the city of Goa, now Old Goa, capital of the Portuguese Estado da Índia from the 1530s until its decline and abandonment. It ran from the Palace of the Viceroys and the river quay in the north to the Church of the Misericórdia in the south, and was also known as the Rua dos Leilões ("Street of Auctions") for the public sales held along it every morning.

It was the city's principal market and its ceremonial and administrative axis. On it, or in the squares at its ends and beside it, stood the viceroy's palace, the cathedral and archbishop's palace, the Inquisition, the High Court, the municipal council, the main quay and customs area and the central market; the trade of the Indian Ocean passed through the same street. The government of Portuguese Asia, its church and its commerce were, in effect, concentrated in a few hundred metres.

The road still exists today, running from the Viceroy's Arch to Gandhi Circle, the former site of the Pelourinho Velho square. Almost all the buildings lining it were demolished after the city was abandoned and their materials reused elsewhere.

== Name ==
Direita is Portuguese for "straight" (and "right"). The street was so called because it led straight from the Palace of the Viceroys to the Church of the Misericórdia. The name was common for the main street of Portuguese towns.

The City of Goa grew organically and almost all the streets of the city were winding and irregular and none of the streets opening off the Rua Direita met it at a right angle, or at any repeated angle. A long, straight street was therefore unusual in the city and easy to recognise.

== The city ==
=== The capital of Portuguese Asia ===
Afonso de Albuquerque took Goa from the Sultanate of Bijapur in 1510, after losing it once in the same year (see Conquest of Goa (1510)). In 1530 the seat of the Portuguese empire in the East was moved there from Cochin, and the viceroy of the Estado da Índia had his residence in the city. Its role was set out in a 1582 description as "head and principal seat" of the Portuguese state in the East and "emporium and universal fair of all the Orient". In 1558 a papal bull raised its church to a metropolitan archbishopric.

Map of Goa

The original walled core was small, with an east west axis of under 500 metres and an area of about twenty hectares, surrounded by a moat and a wall with four gates. From the 16th century the city grew far beyond it, largely through the building of churches, convents and colleges on the surrounding hills; every major religious order had a house there, and the building programme reached its peak in the decades around 1600, particularly under Archbishop Aleixo de Meneses (1595–1612). The epithet "Rome of the East" was applied to it. Estimates of its population at its height run to about 200,000.

=== Trade and people ===
Goa's importance came first from trade. After the sea route round the Cape of Good Hope was opened and Ormuz and Malacca were taken, Goa replaced the Levant as the principal emporium between East and West, and goods were shipped from it to Lisbon. The crown kept the spice trade as a monopoly, and about 30,000 quintais of spices were sent to Portugal each year. The port was also the main point of entry on the west coast for Persian and Arabian horses, which were exported on to the Deccan. People from almost every country of the East came there to trade. By the 1580s the inhabitants included Hindus, Muslims, Jews, Arabs, Armenians, Persians, Gujaratis and people from the Deccan, as well as the Portuguese.

=== Decline ===
The site was a poor one. The low, enclosed ground was stifling and badly drained, the city drew its water from many polluted wells, and epidemics of cholera and smallpox were frequent, killing viceroys, archbishops, inquisitors and officials in large numbers. The city's commercial importance also declined from the later 16th century, and from the 17th century its population moved gradually to Ribandar and Panjim.

== The street ==
=== Course and origin ===
The Rua Direita ran north–south through the old walled core, connecting its two main gates over about half a kilometre:

- in the north, the gate of the Quay or of the Fortress (Porta do Cais / da Fortaleza), opening on the square of the main quay and rebuilt in 1597 as the Viceroy's Arch (Arco dos Vice-Reis); and
- in the south, the gate of the Baçais (cattle market), beside which, on the inside, stood the Church and Chapel of the Misericórdia, the Church of Nossa Senhora da Serra and the Bazar Velho.

The street was the successor of the main souk of the Bijapuri city and was probably reformed after 1510. Beyond the old wall it continued south past the squares of the Pelourinho Velho and the Pelourinho Novo, which gave it a length of about two kilometres in older descriptions. A tradition holds that it followed an older Kadamba era royal road, the Raj Vidi, but no evidence has been found for this.

=== The Viceroys' Square ===
Palace of the Viceroys, City of Goa

The Terreiro dos Vice-Reis lay inside the northern gate, between the quay and the street. A staircase led from the quayside square up to the Palace of the Viceroys (Paço da Fortaleza), rebuilt from 1554 from the castle that Albuquerque had built over the palace of the Adil Shah; one doorway of the Adil Shah's palace survives, re-erected. The High Court (Tribunal da Relação) opened onto the square, with the tronco on its south side, and the aljube, a prison for the clergy, lay in a street to the west. The Theatine complex of St. Cajetan was added on its eastern edge later and survives. On the riverfront to the west lay the shipyard (Ribeira das Naus), arsenal, foundry, mint and the Royal Hospital of All Saints.

=== The Terreiro do Sabaio ===
About halfway along the street, a passage to the west led to the Terreiro do Sabaio, the main institutional square of the walled city. It was occupied by:

- the parish church of Santa Catarina (1514), made a cathedral in 1534 and replaced by the present Sé Cathedral, begun in 1564 and finished in 1652, the largest church built by the Portuguese anywhere in their empire; the Archbishop's Palace beside it and, behind, the first Franciscan convent in the city;
- the Casa da Câmara (municipal council house) and the royal tobacco monopoly (Estanco Real dos Tabacos) on the north side; and
- the Inquisition on the south side, in the building that had first housed the viceroys and governors, formerly the palace of the Sultan of Bijapur (the Paço do Sabaio).

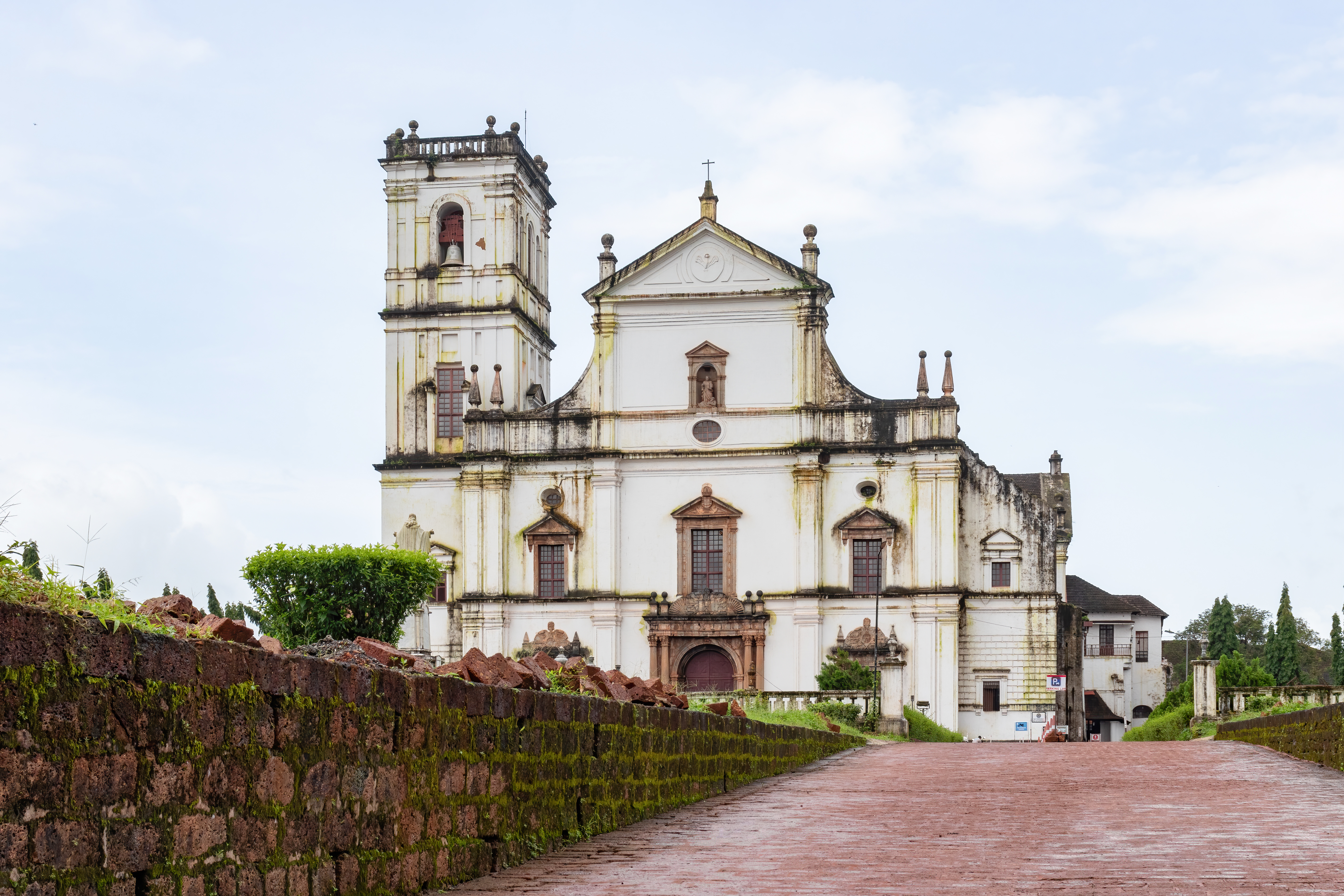
Se Primacial from the Rua Direita

=== The southern end ===
The Church of the Misericórdia stood out into the street in the middle of O Leilão, making it one of the most prominent buildings in Goa. Beside it stood the Church of Nossa Senhora da Serra, founded in 1513 by Albuquerque in fulfilment of a vow. It was built over the main gate of the old Muslim wall, which gave it a tower that could be used for defence, and for about half a century it was Albuquerque's burial place; parts of its chancel survive and are still used for burials. Nearby was the Bazar Velho, 48 shops of uniform design around a square, perhaps modelled on or built over an Islamic funduq.

On the east side of the street stood the Casa da Bula ("House of the Bull"), where papal bulls were first proclaimed. The Bula da Santa Cruzada was instituted in Goa on 24 May 1593. Its only identified surviving trace is a doorway in the Manueline style.

=== Auctions ===
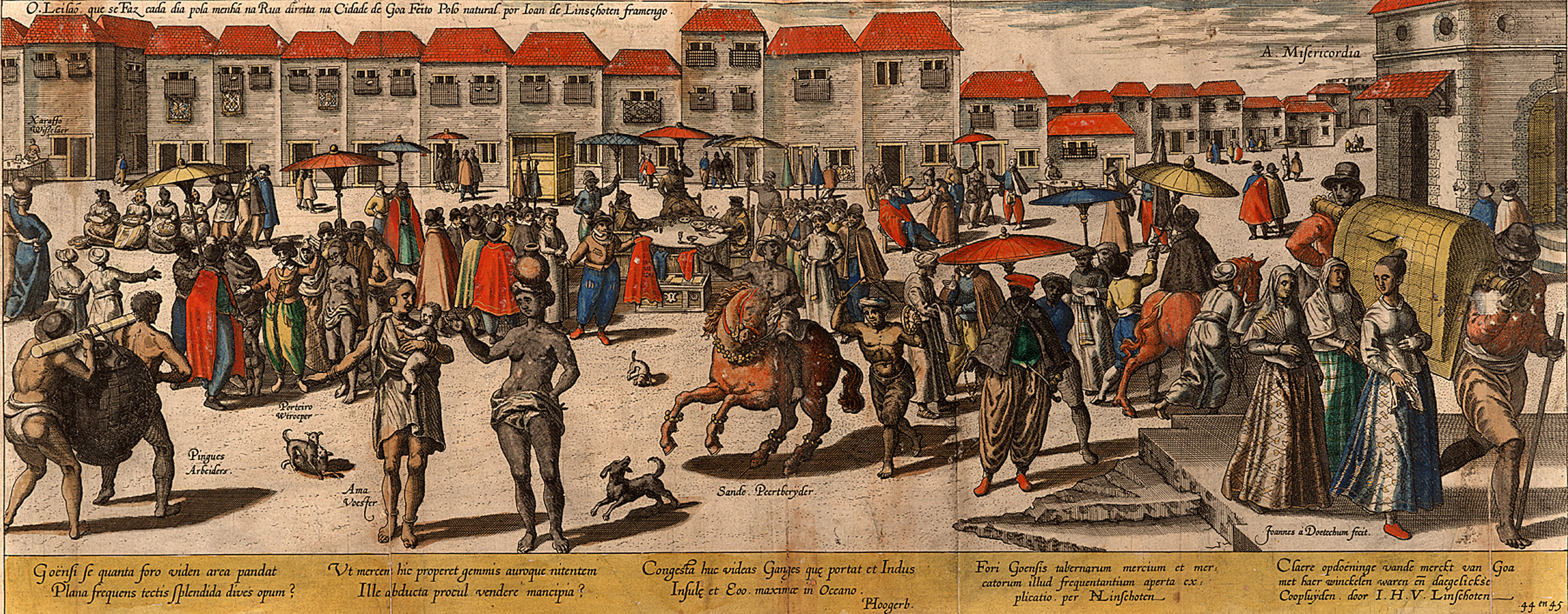
The auction at the Rua Direita

The street was lined on both sides with imposing buildings in which bankers, jewellers and merchants of many nations did business, and was crowded from morning until noon with people attending the auction sales. People of all religions and origins mixed there, carrying large umbrellas against the sun and the monsoon rain. Sales ordered by the law courts were held on the street, public revenues were farmed out, and the goods offered included the valuable products of India, Arabian and Persian horses, and enslaved men and women, priced according to their skills in music, embroidery and other arts as well as their looks. The street was also described as lined with goldsmiths, lapidaries, the houses of the wealthy and the better merchants and craftsmen. A visitor in 1608–10 called it "very handsome and broad, full of shops".

The auctions made the street a clearing-house for goods from across the Indian Ocean and also the city's slave market. Slave labour was the economic basis of the Portuguese elite, many of whom did not follow any trade and lived on the earnings of their slaves.

=== Appearance ===
The apparent uniformity of the street's architecture comes from one small section, the Largo da Misericórdia, in a 1596 view and is contradicted by other accounts. The typical house had two storeys, was built of lime-and-sand mortar, roofed with tile and often washed in red and white, with latticed windows and muxarabi balconies on the upper floor, and had polished oyster shells (carepas) in place of glass; there were gardens and orchards behind. Over time many courtyard houses of the earlier city were rebuilt as European-style lots, with the house at the front and a yard behind. The street was where the wealth of the city's upper class was on show.

=== Neighbouring streets ===
The Rua da Conceição left the Rua Direita just before the Casa da Bula and led to the Porta da Conceição. At the southern end, outside the wall, the old pillory square was a junction of seven roads, including the roads to São Tomé and Trinidade and the Estrada da Luz. The Rua Direita also led to the Rua de Cordoaria, Rua de Mestre Joao and several others.

== Decline and afterlife ==
As the city declined, officials and residents moved down the river, and in 1843 the capital was officially moved to Panjim as "Nova Goa", leaving the old city to be called "Velha Goa". In 1774 the Marquis of Pombal ordered the cleansing and restoration of the city and the return of royal officials; three plans were drawn up between 1774 and 1777 and, although the scheme failed, they record the buildings that were then still standing. After the suppression of the religious orders in 1834, buildings were dismantled and their materials reused, a practice that was particularly encouraged by the viceroy Diogo de Sousa, Count of Rio Pardo (1816–1821).

The road was still to be seen in 1878, and it remains in use today, although the buildings along it have gone. A 1959 plan for the "reintegration" of Velha Goa gave the central area, where the churches and convents now stand in open grounds, its present landscaped form. The surviving churches and convents were inscribed on the UNESCO World Heritage List in 1986 as the Churches and convents of Goa.

== See also ==
- City of Goa
- Palace of the Fortress
- Market of Goa
- Churches and convents of Goa
- Pelourinho Novo
- Viceroy's Arch
- Sé Cathedral, Goa
- Goa Inquisition
