= Pelourinho Novo =

Pillory in Goa, India

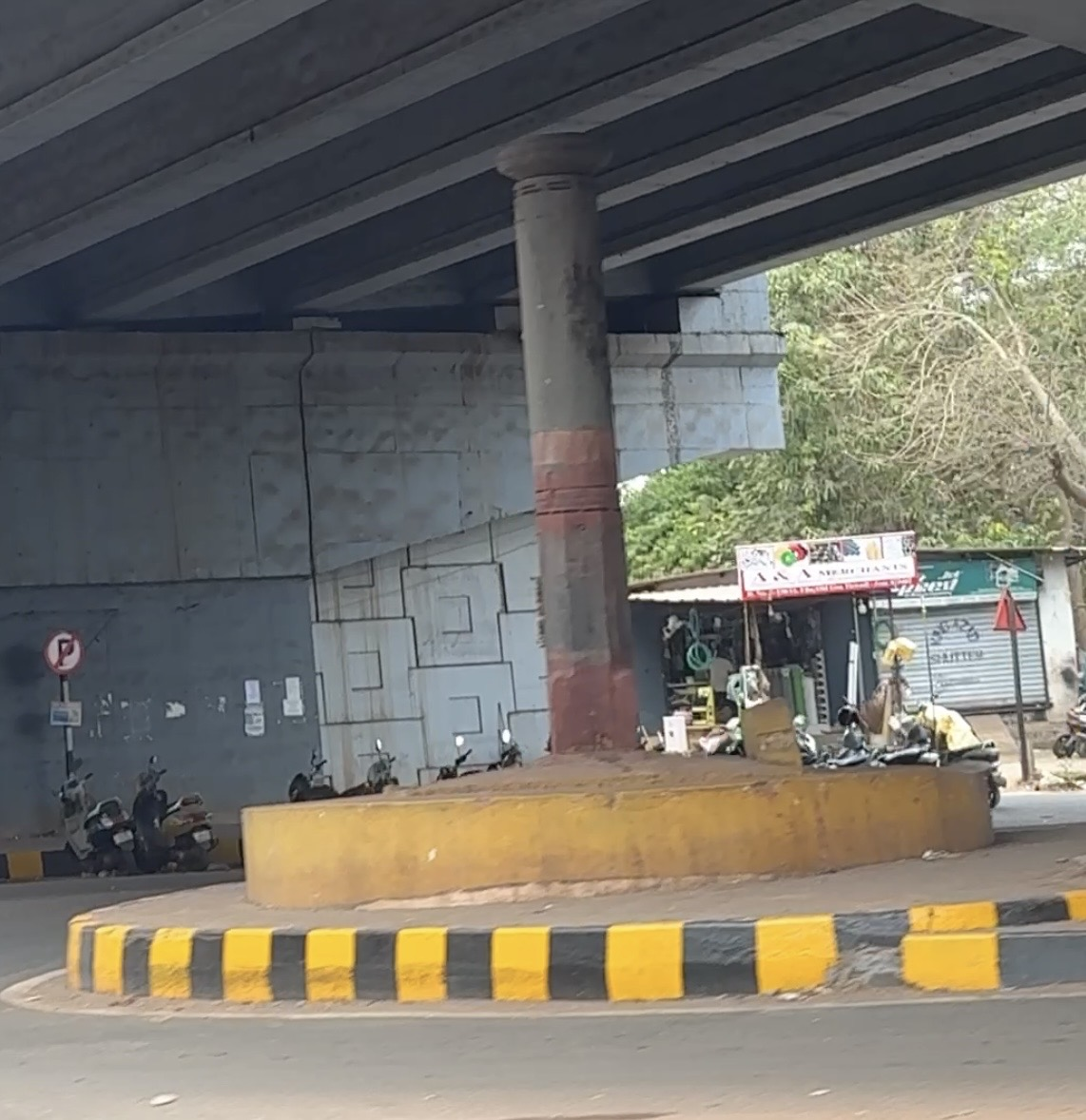
- The pillory in 2026
- Interactive map of the Pelourinho Novo area
- Alternative names: Hath Katro Khamb, Inquisition Pillar (Note: alternatively known as the Pillar of Inquisition)

General information
- Status: Defunct
- Type: Pillory
- Architectural style: Kadamba architecture
- Classification: State Protected Monument
- Location: Old Goa, Goa, India
- Coordinates: 15°29′57.1″N 73°54′48.6″E
- Year built: 16th-century
- Relocated: After 1961
- Closed: Before 1886
- Owner: Department of Archaeology, Goa

Technical details
- Material: Basalt

Design and construction
- Known for: Pro-Hindu folklore

The Pelourinho Novo (lit. 'New Pillory'), also known as Hath Katro Khamb (Note: alternatively spelt as Haat Katro Khambo or Haatkatro Khamb.) (lit. 'Hand-Cutting Pillar'), is a sixteenth-century black basalt pillory in Old Goa, located in the Indian coastal state of Goa. It acted as a symbolic civic marker and a focal point for official proceedings, where authorities handled legal matters, issued formal announcements, and enforced penalties, including corporal punishment such as the whipping of offenders.

== History ==
=== Background ===
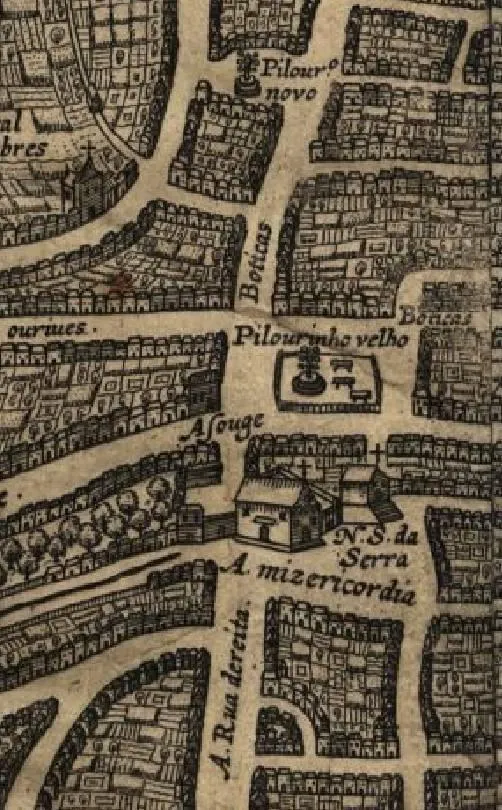
A 1595 map of Cidade de Goa by Jan Huyghen van Linschoten, showing the pelourinhos in the city (top and middle).

There is no clear consensus about the pillory's history. It was originally built in the late sixteenth-century, and by 1886, it was in a state of ruins. Historical maps from the late sixteenth and early seventeenth centuries document the presence of the pillory, including depictions by Dutch traveler Jan Huygen van Linschoten and in maps of Old Goa created by Bugis-Portuguese cartographer Manuel Godinho de Erédia.

According to veteran historian Percival Noronha, the pillory existed during the period of the Adil Shahi rule in Goa and used as a site to punish criminals by cutting off one of their hands. A common offense was failing to pay debts. Some claim that the monument was used during the Goa Inquisition; however, these claims have been debunked.

Svetlana Pereira of The Navhind Times writes, the pillory functioned as a focal point for key civic and economic activities. It also acted as a public site where official announcements, including municipal decisions and mayoral election results, were communicated.

=== Portuguese period (1510–1961) ===
Fernão Lopes, a former Portuguese convict forced into service during viceroy of Portuguese India Afonso de Albuquerque's first campaign, later reflected the influence of the pillory in his rogue-style narrative. In the aftermath of the Portuguese triumph over the Adil Shahi forces at Ela in February 1510, troops who had demonstrated notable valor were granted women from the defeated ruler's harem as a form of compensation.

Contemporary records describe these Portuguese soldiers as "casados," or married men, a designation that carried social stigma due to their unions with local women whom prevailing colonial attitudes deemed of lower status. As church authorities increasingly denounced these marriages, officials intervened by separating Bijapuri women from their partners and redistributing them elsewhere. Rather than accept this separation, a number of casados including Lopes, left Portuguese-held territory and sought refuge at the Muslim territory of Banastarim, across the Mandovi River, in order to preserve their family lives.

When Albuquerque reestablished Portuguese dominance in November 1510, Banastarim was brought under his control. Under the negotiated terms of capitulation, Muslim authorities were compelled to surrender the Portuguese renegades who had sought refuge there. These men were subsequently tried for disloyalty and subjected to harsh exemplary punishment. Approximately twenty casados were publicly displayed on pillories before enduring extensive mutilation, including the amputation of facial features and limbs such as noses, ears, right hands, and left thumbs. Around half died from the ordeal, while the remaining survivors were exiled from Goa after their release.

=== Contemporary period (1961–present) ===
The pillory deteriorated after Goa was annexed by India in 1961 and at that time stood roughly 20 metres from where it is today. Its former site, historically known as Pelourinho Velho or Baratilha, is now identified as Gandhi Circle. It was later acquired by the Athaide family, who moved it onto their own property as the original area had become overcrowded.

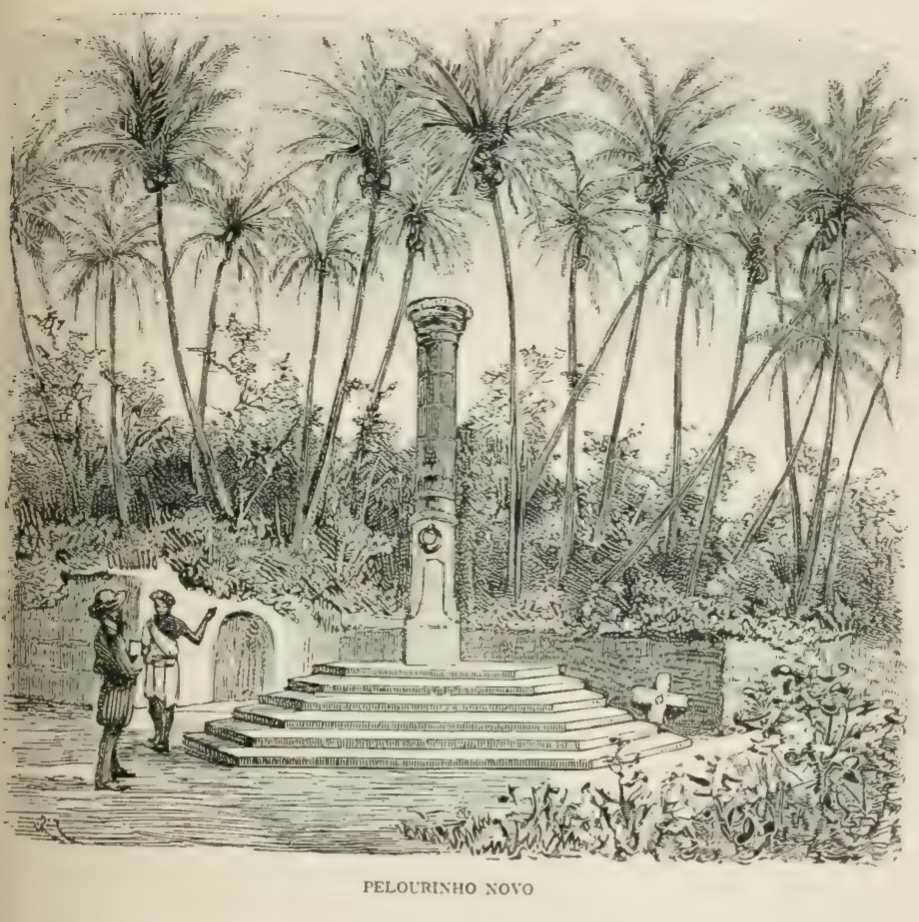
A sketch of Pelourinho Novo in A India Portugueza (1886) by António Lopes Mendes

In 2008, the Directorate of Transport in Goa issued a directive to relocate the pillory due to concerns about traffic safety. This proposal was met with resistance from local residents and community figures, including the then rector of the Basilica of Bom Jesus, Fr. Savio Barreto, who argued that moving it would affect public sentiment. Instead, they recommended that the state government construct a traffic island around the structure. In the same year, a proposal was also made to grant the pillory protected monument status.

In 2024, the Department of Archaeology, Goa, submitted a proposal to the state government seeking protected monument status for the pillory. The proposal encountered resistance, largely because the site did not meet the requirement of maintaining a 100-meter buffer zone.

In February 2026, the Department of Archaeology proposed to the state government that the pillory be granted protected monument status and be renamed with the Konkani name "Haat Katro Khambo." The proposal was formally recorded in March through its publication in the Official Gazette under the Goa Ancient Monuments and Archaeological Sites and Remains Act, 1978.

The move drew significant criticism in April from a group of historians, academics, journalists, and other commentators, including Dale Luis Menezes, Cédric Lobo, Joseph A. Q. Marques, Frazer Andrade, Dr. Luis Dias, Amita Kanekar, Maria de Lourdes Bravo da Costa Rodrigues, and Celsa Pinto.

The group submitted a formal objection to the Department of Archaeology, challenging the proposed renaming. They pointed out that 19th-century historical records identify the structure as "Pelourinho Novo" and argued that the new name lacked documentary support. They also rejected claims associating the pillory with the practice of hand-cutting, stating that such interpretations stem from narratives promoted by certain pro-Hindu organizations rather than from verifiable historical evidence. Historian Prajal Sakhardande instead suggested the alternative name "Pelourinho Novo: Hath Katro Khamb."

In the same month, objections were also raised by members of the Save Old Goa Action Committee (SOGAC) and local residents, calling for the name change to be reverted to its original historical name. In their defense, they argued that they submitted photographs of the pillory bearing a stone marker identifying the structure as "Pelourinho Novo" and emphasized its inclusion among the UNESCO World Heritage Sites of Old Goa.

According to Nirmala Carvalho of Crux, drawing on insights from researcher Frazer Andrade, segments of the Israeli Jewish population have expressed marked attention toward the pillory.

Congress legislator Carlos Álvares Ferreira also commented on the debate, stating that the newly proposed name lacks historical basis. He dismissed assertions that amputations took place at the pillory and expressed concern that history could be misrepresented through unverified anecdotal narratives.

In September 2026, the Department of Archaeology, Goa, designated the pillory as a protected site under the Goa Ancient Monuments and Archaeological Sites and Remains Act, 1978.

== Pro-Hindu views ==
In 2015, a group of right-wing Hindu organizations in Goa, operating collectively as the National Hindu Movement (NHM), organized protests in Ponda. The coalition, comprising groups such as Shiv Sena, Hindu Janajagruti Samiti (HJS), Sanatan Sanstha, and Ranragini, called for the pillory to be officially recognized as a national monument. They claimed that it represented the sacrifices made by Goan freedom fighters in their efforts to end Portuguese rule in Goa.

In 2017, groups associated with the Hindu Janajagruti Samiti (HJS) issued warnings to the Government of Goa and the state's Directorate of Archives and Archaeology about the pillory. They indicated that protests and agitations could be organized if the pillory was not adequately maintained. According to these groups, the pillory was linked to the period of the Goa Inquisition. They claimed that it had been a site where local Hindus were punished or killed for resisting religious conversion under Portuguese rule.

A spokesperson for the organization, Manoj Solanki, stated that references to the pillory had appeared in official records up to 2006, but alleged that efforts had been made to omit such documentation. The groups also proposed an alternative historical interpretation, suggesting that the pillory may predate Portuguese rule and could be linked to the Saptakoteshwar Temple from the time of the Kadamba dynasty, which they asserted was later destroyed during Portuguese Goa.

In 2026, Subhash Velingkar, former RSS Goa chief, claimed that the pillory is the sole remaining structure linked to the Goa Inquisition, which he described as involving "demonic acts." He urged the Government of Goa to relocate the pillory to a secure site in Old Goa so it could be accessible for public display. He asserted that opposition to the proposed renaming of the pillory was motivated by an effort to downplay the historical legacy of the Goa Inquisition.

== Analysis ==
There are differing opinions regarding the origin of the pillory's history; however, a broad consensus among subject matter experts holds that the Pelourinho Novo had no connection to the Goa Inquisition.

Historian Percival Noronha argues that the pillory was used in pre-Portuguese Goa, during the rule of the Adil Shah dynasty, where criminals' hands were amputated. Journalist Svetlana Pereira also states that this practice occurred, though she provides limited context regarding the specific period and emphasizes that only "one of the hands" were amputated.

Historian Prajal Sakhardande likewise acknowledged the historical significance of the pillory, noting the presence of an inscription in Kannada. He further clarified that there is no documented evidence to support claims that acts such as the cutting of hands ever occurred at the site, and rejected assertions by history enthusiast Sanjeev Sardesai that individuals' hands were tied and broken at the site.

A 2021 study by American academic Timothy D. Walker, published in OpenEdition Journals, explains that pillories were present throughout the Portuguese Empire and functioned as symbols of governmental authority. They were commonly introduced as part of the establishment of new Portuguese settlements and were usually positioned in prominent public areas, often near administrative buildings. These sites were associated with legal proceedings, the enforcement of punishments in public view, and the formal communication of official rules and decisions. Walker also notes that physical forms of punishment were commonly conducted at these sites.

A 2025 report in O Heraldo aligns with Walker's findings. It notes that, prior to Portuguese Goa, individuals convicted of minor crimes had a hand amputated at the site, a view also associated with Noronha's account of the pillory’s history. The article further states that this form of punishment is believed to have persisted until the end of Portuguese rule in Goa.

Academic Rev. (Dr.) Victor Ferrão states that the pillory functioned mainly as an instrument of corporal punishment for relatively minor offenses, such as petty crimes, tax nonpayment, or breaches of public order. Those condemned were fastened to iron restraints on the pillory, where they faced public whipping or humiliation intended to discourage similar behavior.

Ferrao also indicates that accounts of hand amputation are more likely connected to pre-Portuguese governance in Goa or may derive from oral traditions passed down through generations, rather than from well-substantiated historical records. Ferrão was featured in a discussion with Goa News Hub regarding the pillory’s proposed name change, alongside Chetan Rajhans of the right-wing pro-Hindu organization Sanatan Sanstha.

Modern historians and researchers including Dale Luis Menezes, Cédric Lobo, and Frazer Andrade dismissed assertions that amputations were carried out at the pillory. They also dispute any connection between the structure and the Goa Inquisition, arguing that proposals to rename it appear aimed at reinterpreting the site as a memorial to alleged victims of that period. According to these researchers, the practice of hand amputation was not a recognized form of punishment in Goa, Europe, or under the Portuguese Empire.

Menezes further explains that pillories like Pelourinho Novo historically served as markers of public spaces and were found across regions from Gujarat to Kerala. He expressed concern over the proposed renaming by the Department of Archaeology, stating that it relied on folklore without documented historical evidence, and advocated for preserving the monument's original name.

Lobo maintains that the association of the pillory with the Goa Inquisition, along with claims of Hindu conversions and stories of amputations, does not stem from historical records but from online propaganda linked to the Hindu Janajagruti Samiti (HJS). In his view, the repeated circulation of these ideas on digital platforms led to their broader acceptance as established facts. He also observes that Inquisition courts existed in regions such as Spain, Brazil, and Portuguese cities including Lisbon, Coimbra, and Évora, and notes the absence of evidence for hand amputation being practiced in any of these contexts.

== Current status ==
As of 2008, the pillory laid within the private property of the Athaide family, who acquired it after the annexation of Goa in 1961. By 2026, it has no ownership, and the site on which it stands is designated as a road area. Therefore, it is neither owned by a private individual nor by the Government of Goa.

The pillory was maintained by the Directorate of Archives and Archaeology, Goa, and is now under the Department of Archaeology, Goa. As of 2016, it had not yet been claimed by the Archaeological Survey of India (ASI), nor had it been granted the status of a protected monument. In the same year, there was a discrepancy regarding whether the Directorate of Archives and Archaeology, Goa, had official authority over it, given its status.

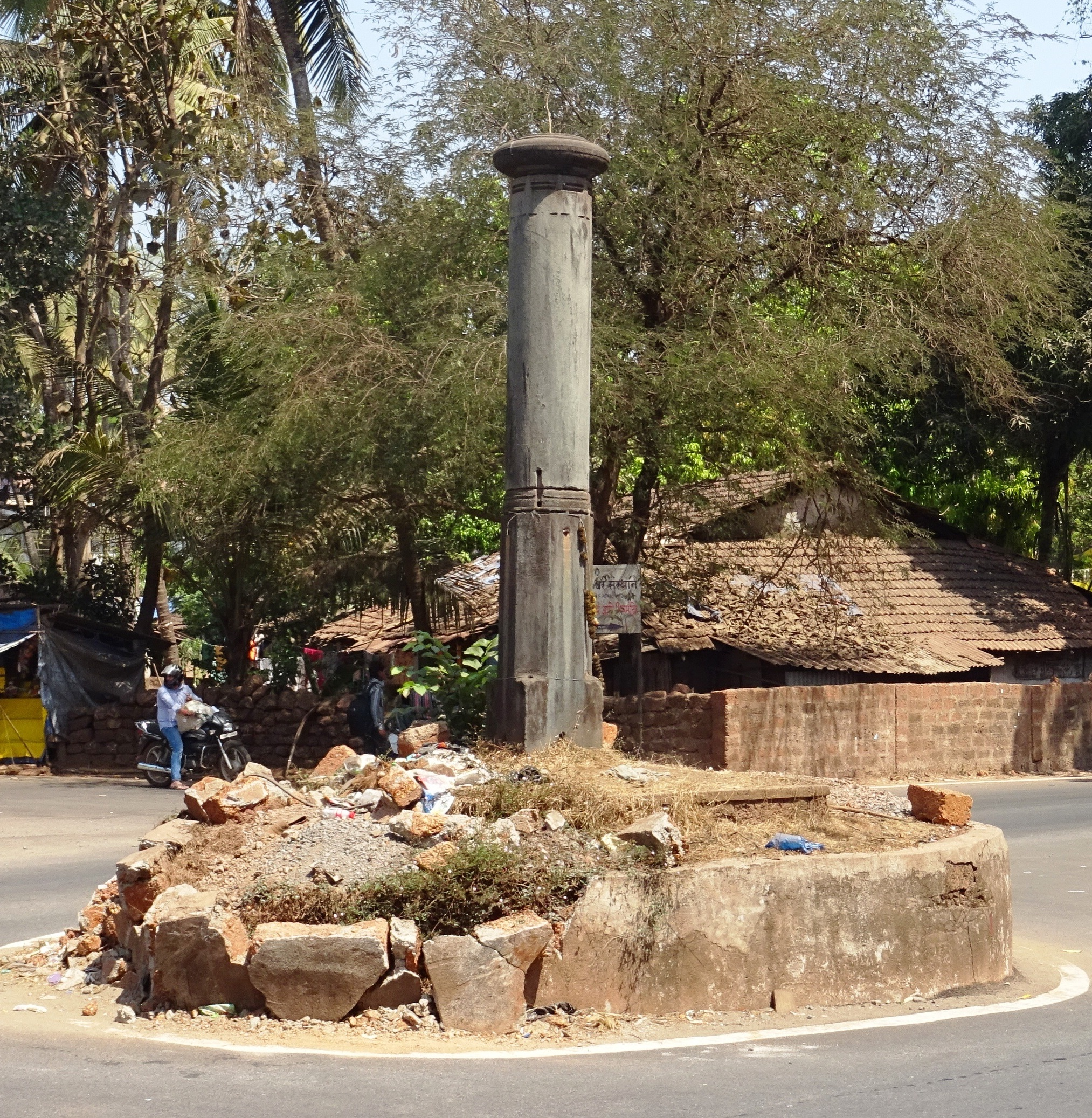
The pillory in 2017

As of 2017, the pillory’s platform had been damaged twice due to vehicle collisions, given its central location at a road junction. Historian Prajal Sakhardande requested the concerned authorities to preserve the pillory, as it posed a traffic hazard.
