= Feira (Santa Maria da Feira) =

Former civil parish in Portugal

- Civil parish
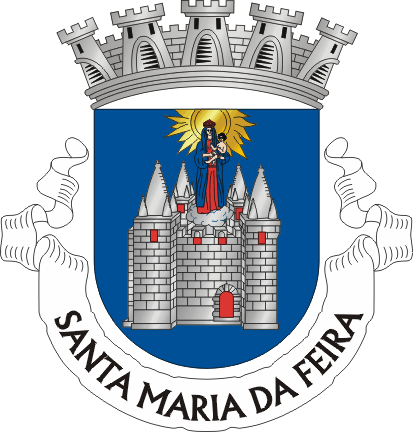
- Coat of arms

- Location in Portugal
- Coordinates: 40.930°N 8.552°W
- Country: Portugal
- Region: Norte
- Metropolitan area: Porto
- District: Aveiro
- Municipality: Santa Maria da Feira
- Disbanded: 2013

Area
  - Total: 8.40 km^{2} (3.24 sq mi)

Population (2001)
  - Total: 11,040
  - Density: 1,300/km^{2} (3,400/sq mi)
- Time zone: UTC+00:00 (WET)
  - Summer (DST): UTC+01:00 (WEST)

Feira is a former civil parish in the municipality of Santa Maria da Feira, Portugal. In 2013, the parish merged into the new parish Santa Maria da Feira, Travanca, Sanfins e Espargo. Covering the historic city centre, it is the seat of the Santa Maria da Feira Municipality. It has a population of 11,040 inhabitants and a total area of 8.40 km^{2}. Its demonym is Feirense. While city's official name is Santa Maria da Feira, it is often referred to as simply Feira, including on highway signs. The surrounding area is often known as Terras de Santa Maria.

The parish is the location of a medieval castle. It is also famous for its local bread named fogaça and its local market.

== Sights ==
Sights include the Convento do Espírito Santo (convent), the Igreja da Misericórdia (church; 18th century), and the Rua Direita (street; 18th and 19th centuries' architecture). Its greatest landmark is the Santa Maria da Feira Castle, from the 11th century.

== Sporting clubs ==
- Clube Desportivo Feirense
- Sporting Clube de Santa Maria da Feira
