= Mermaid Garden =

Heritage site in Goa, India

- Jardim da Sereia
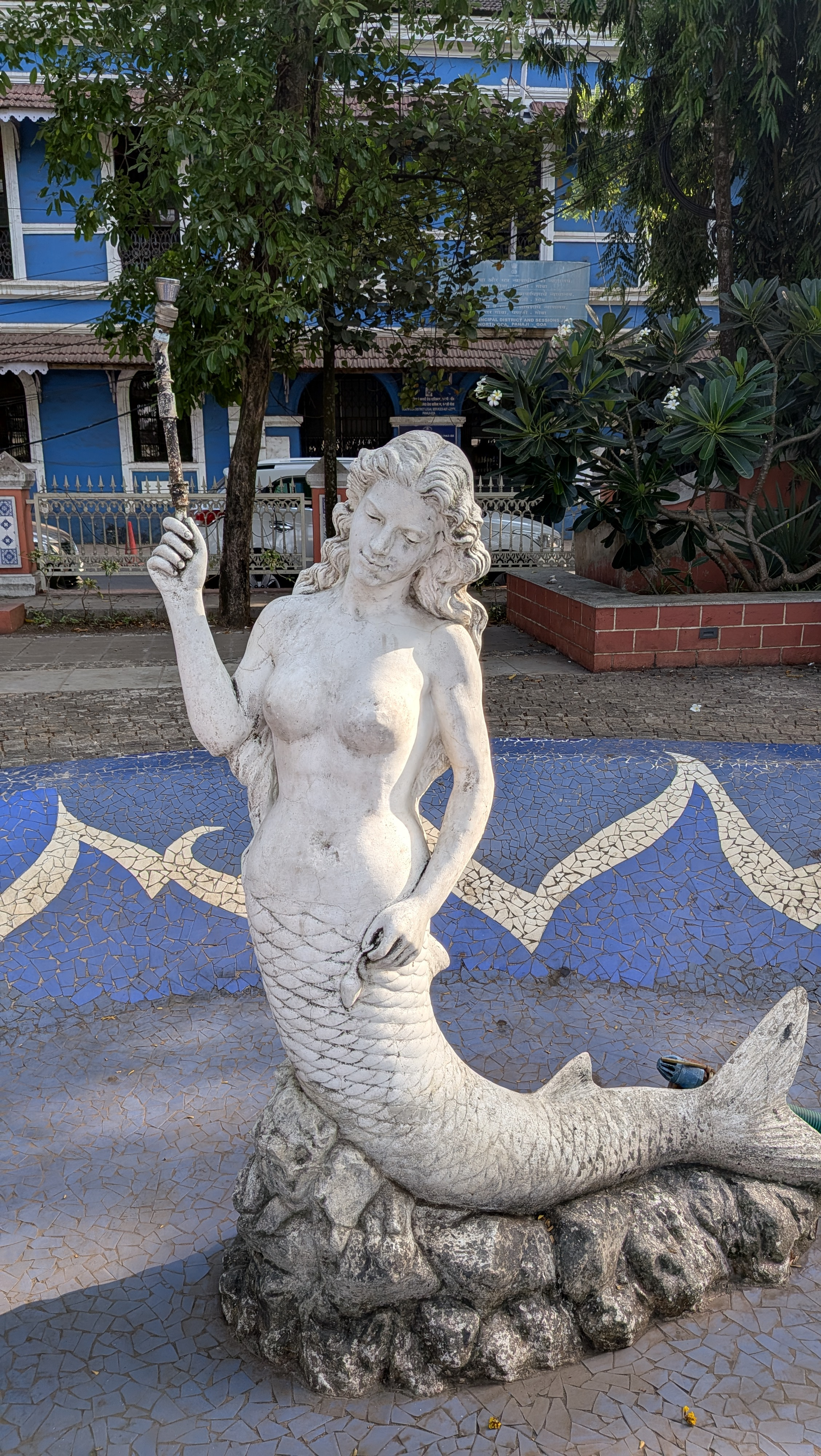
- Mermaid statue at the Mermaid Garden
- Interactive map of Mermaid Garden
- Location: Campal, Panaji, Goa, India
- Coordinates: 15°30′02″N 73°49′52″E
- Designer: Vishnu Mahadev Cuncolkar
- Type: Statue in a garden
- Material: Porcelain
- Height: 5 feet (1.5 m)
- Opening date: c. 1940s—1950s
- Restored date: 2012

Mermaid Garden, also known as Jardim da Sereia, is a public park and heritage site located in Campal locality of Panaji, the capital of Goa, India.

== History ==
The mermaid garden was set up under the mayoralty of Froilano de Mello in the 1940s or 1950s. Historian Sanjeev Sardesai suggests that the statue was sculpted by Vishnu Mahadev Cuncolkar. He further states that the garden served as a resting spot for seafarers whose ships were anchored nearby.

== Design ==
The central feature of the park is a porcelain statue of a mermaid. She is depicted as being bare breasted and is 5 feet (1.5 m) tall. The statue is placed in a shallow pond in a garden. The statue featured a lotus in her hand and is possibly inspired by The Little Mermaid and the azulejos featuring a mermaid at the Institute Menezes Braganza.

== Significance ==
The garden is recognized as a significant part of Panaji's cultural and architectural heritage. In 2018, it was featured in an art exhibition titled "The Sun Also Sets," curated by Vivek Menezes, which highlighted the history of Panaji while drawing attention to the environmental and structural threats facing the city's landmarks. The garden has been described as a site of "melancholy" and historical reflection within the Goan landscape.

== Condition and restoration ==
The Mermaid Garden has faced periods of physical decline and neglect. It was restored by sculptor Ghaneshyam Chari in 2012 as part of preparations for the 43rd International Film Festival of India. It was during this time that it was discovered that the statue had 18 layers of paint, under which it was found to be made of porcelain.

In January 2019, the mermaid statue was vandalized, resulting in the breakage of one of its arms. By 2020, the park was poorly maintained, with overgrown weeds and wild vegetation obstructing the pathways and the central statue.

In early 2022, the Corporation of the City of Panaji (CCP) announced plans for a significant restoration of the garden as part of a broader effort to rejuvenate the city's public spaces. The proposed facelift included the installation of new illumination, the development of a pathway, and general landscaping to restore the site's aesthetic appeal.
