= Fogaça =

Fogaça can refer to:

- Fogaça da Feira, a type of Portuguese sweet bread originating from Santa Maria da Feira, Portugal
- Fogaça (surname), Portuguese-language surname
