= Jan Huyghen van Linschoten =

Dutch merchant, traveller and writer (1563-1611)

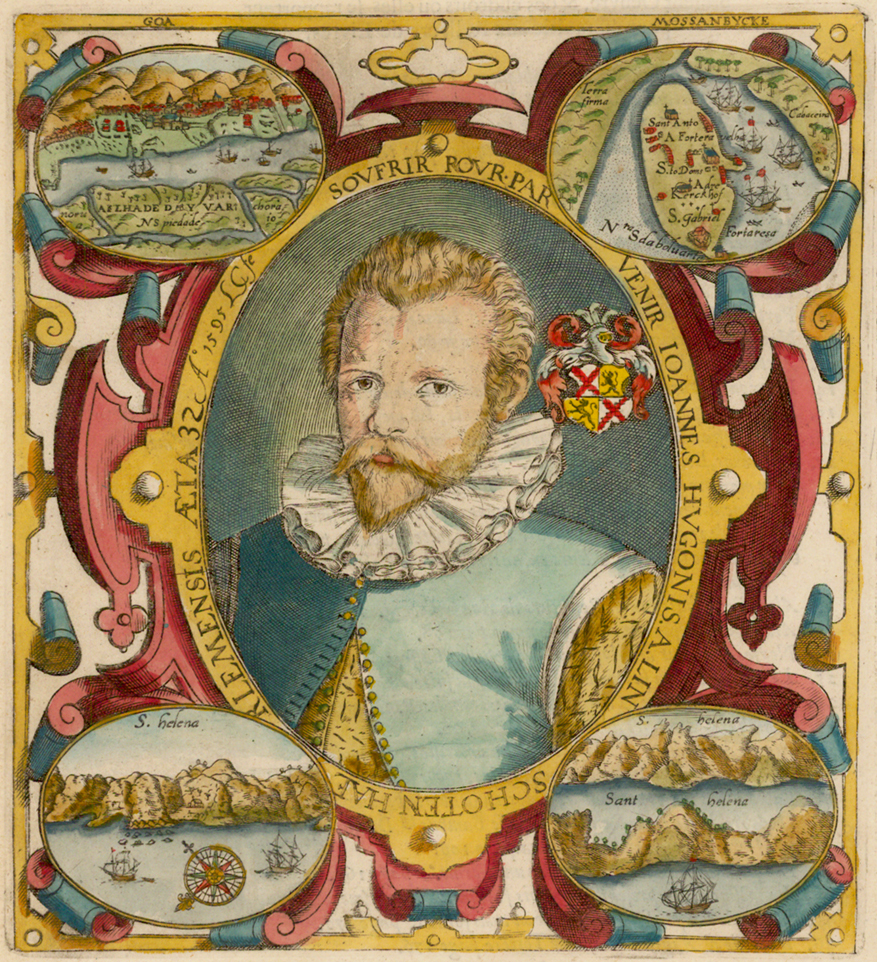
Portrait of Jan Huygen van Linschoten, from the princeps edition of his Itinerario.

Jan Huygen van Linschoten (1563 – 8 February 1611) was a Dutch merchant, traveller and writer.

He travelled extensively along the East Indies regions under Portuguese influence and served as the archbishop's secretary in Goa between 1583 and 1588. He is credited with publishing in Europe important classified information about Asian trade and navigation that was hidden by the Portuguese. In 1596, he published a book, Itinerario (later translated as Discours of Voyages into Ye East & West Indies), which graphically displayed for the first time in Europe detailed maps of voyages to the East Indies, particularly India.

During his stay in Goa, he meticulously copied the secret charts page by page. Even more crucially, he provided nautical data like currents, deeps, islands and sandbanks that were vital for safe navigation, along with coastal depictions to guide the way. The publication of the navigational routes enabled the passage to the East Indies to be opened to trading by the Dutch, French and the English. As a consequence, the Dutch East India Company and the British East India Company would break the 16th-century monopoly enjoyed by the Portuguese on trade with the East Indies.

== Origins ==
Jan Huygen was born in 1563 at Haarlem in Holland, where his father, Huig Joostenszoon, was an innkeeper and notary. His mother, Marietje Tin Henrixdochter, had been previously married to a man named Tin with whom she had two sons, Willem and Floris Tin. In addition to his older half-brothers, Jan had a younger brother and sister. Jan Huyghen added the patronym van Linschoten when he was living in Goa. Neither of his parents had any connection with the Utrecht village of Linschoten and it is not known why he appended it to his name.

The family moved to the town of Enkhuizen when he was young. His father was the innkeeper of The Golden Falcon and was prosperous enough to make loans in the shipping business. Details of Jan's education are not known but it is likely he attended an Enkhuizen Latin School where he studied reading, writing, mathematics and some Latin. He later recalled that he “took no small delight in the reading of histories and strange adventures".

== Early career ==
Linschoten left Holland in 1579 at the age of sixteen. When he was older, he confided that he had no plans except to seek a life of adventure so that when he returned home he would have "something to tell [his] children". On January 1, 1580, he landed in Seville where his two older brothers, Willem and Floris, had established a business. He stayed briefly with Floris, hoping to learn Spanish and establish himself as a merchant. When Philip II of Spain marched into Portugal in August 1580, Linschoten and his brother Floris followed the army in search of opportunities they assumed would follow conquest. Floris soon died of a plague epidemic that swept through Spain and Portugal.

Linschoten found a job in Lisbon, working with another merchant. A downturn in trade led him to seek alternatives. With the help of Willem, who was acquainted with the newly appointed Archbishop of the Portuguese colony of Goa, Dominican D. Frei João Vicente da Fonseca, the younger Huyghen was appointed Secretary to the Archbishop. Huyghen sailed for Goa on 8 April 1583, arriving five months later via Madeira, Guinea, the Cape, Madagascar and Mozambique.

== Goa ==
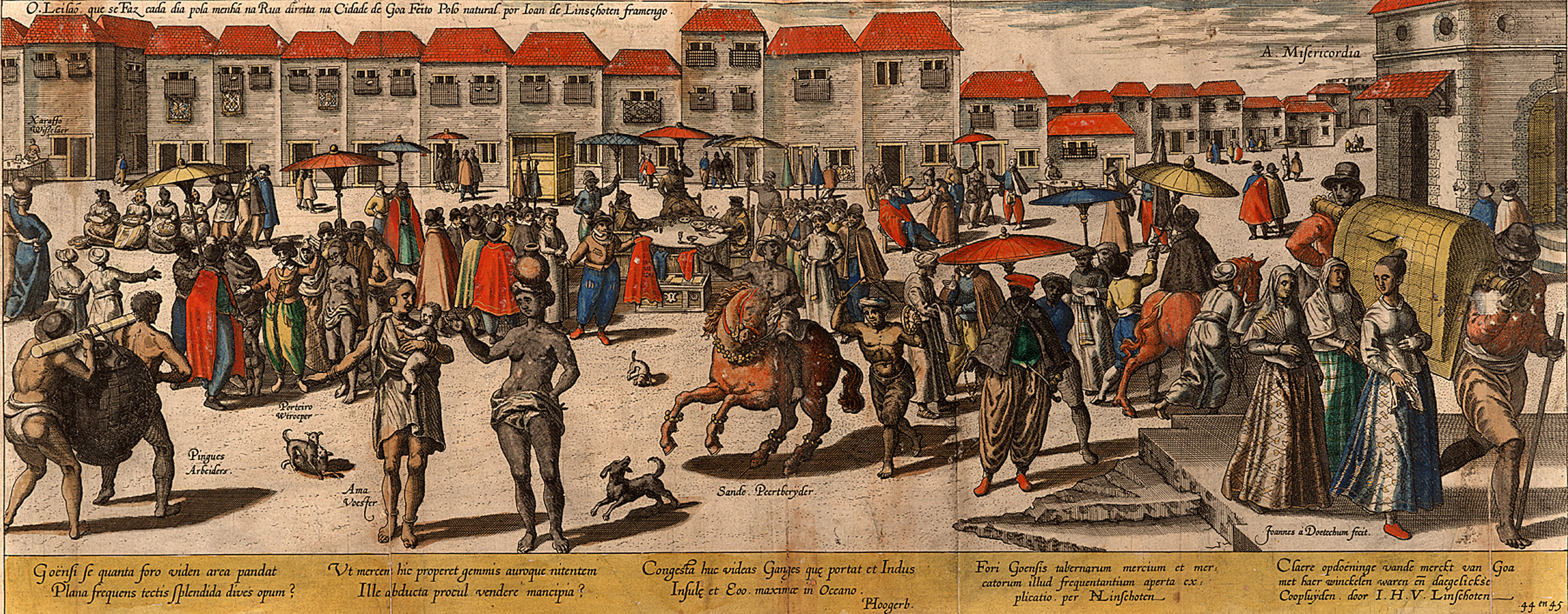
Joannes van Doetecum's print of "The Market at Goa" in Linschoten's Itinerario, showing the main street of Portuguese Goa in the 1580s

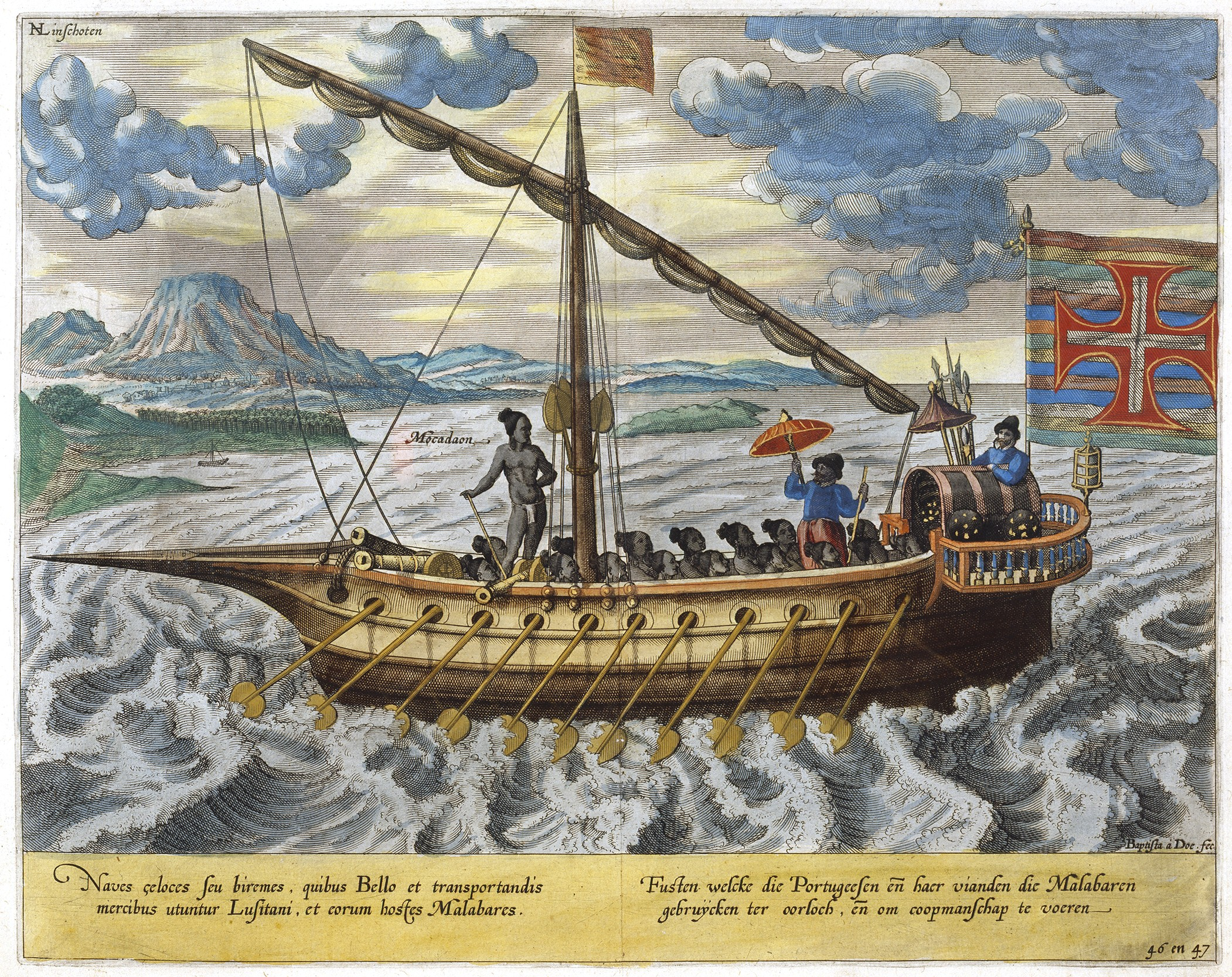
A fusta with Portuguese pavilion from a book by Jan Huygen van Linschoten

While in Goa, Jan Huygen van Linschoten kept a diary of his observations of the Portuguese-ruled city, amassing information about the Europeans, Indians, and other Asians who lived there. He also had access to maps and other privileged information about commerce and Portuguese navigation in southeast Asia and used his cartographic and drawing skills in order to copy and draw new maps, reproducing a considerable amount of nautical and mercantile information. Several of the nautical charts that he copied had been meticulously kept secret by the Portuguese for more than a century.

Later, after returning to Enkhuizen, he collected accounts from other travellers, such as his friend Dirck Gerritsz "China" Pomp, a fellow resident of Enkhuizen who earned his nickname from his travels in the Far East, and was the first Dutchman to travel to China and Japan in three voyages of the Nau do Trato as constable of artillery. Jan Huygen van Linschoten made note of the trading conditions among different countries, and the sea routes for travelling between them. This information later helped both the Dutch and the English to challenge the Portuguese monopoly on East Indian trade.

The 1587 death of his sponsor, the Archbishop of Goa, while on a voyage to Lisbon to report to the King of Portugal, meant the end of van Linschoten's appointment. He set sail for Lisbon in January 1589, passing by the Portuguese supply depot at St. Helena Island in May 1589.

== The Azores ==
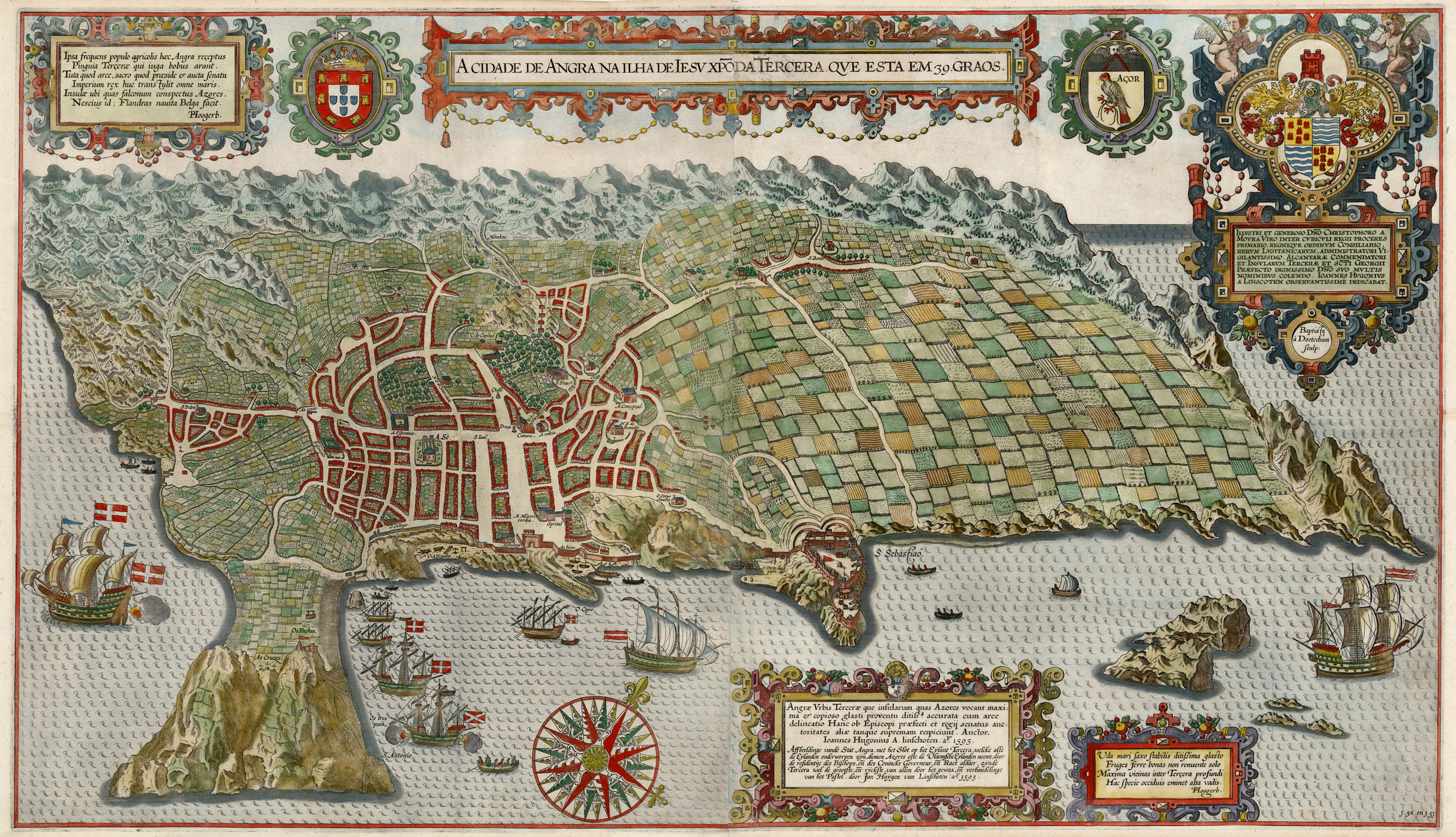
The island of Terceira, Azores, in a hand-colored engraving in the Itinerario.

During a stopover on Saint Helena he met Gerrit van Afhuijsen, an Antwerp resident who had been in Malacca. From him he gained a knowledge of the spice trade in that region. On the next stopover, the Azores, he stayed for two years due to shipwreck caused by the English, who besieged the island. He used the time to map the city of Angra on Terceira for the island's governor, Juan de Urbina. Van Linschoten only reached Lisbon in January 1592. He spent six months at Lisbon, then sailed to his homeland in July 1592 and settled in his home city of Enkhuizen.

== Barentsz First voyage ==
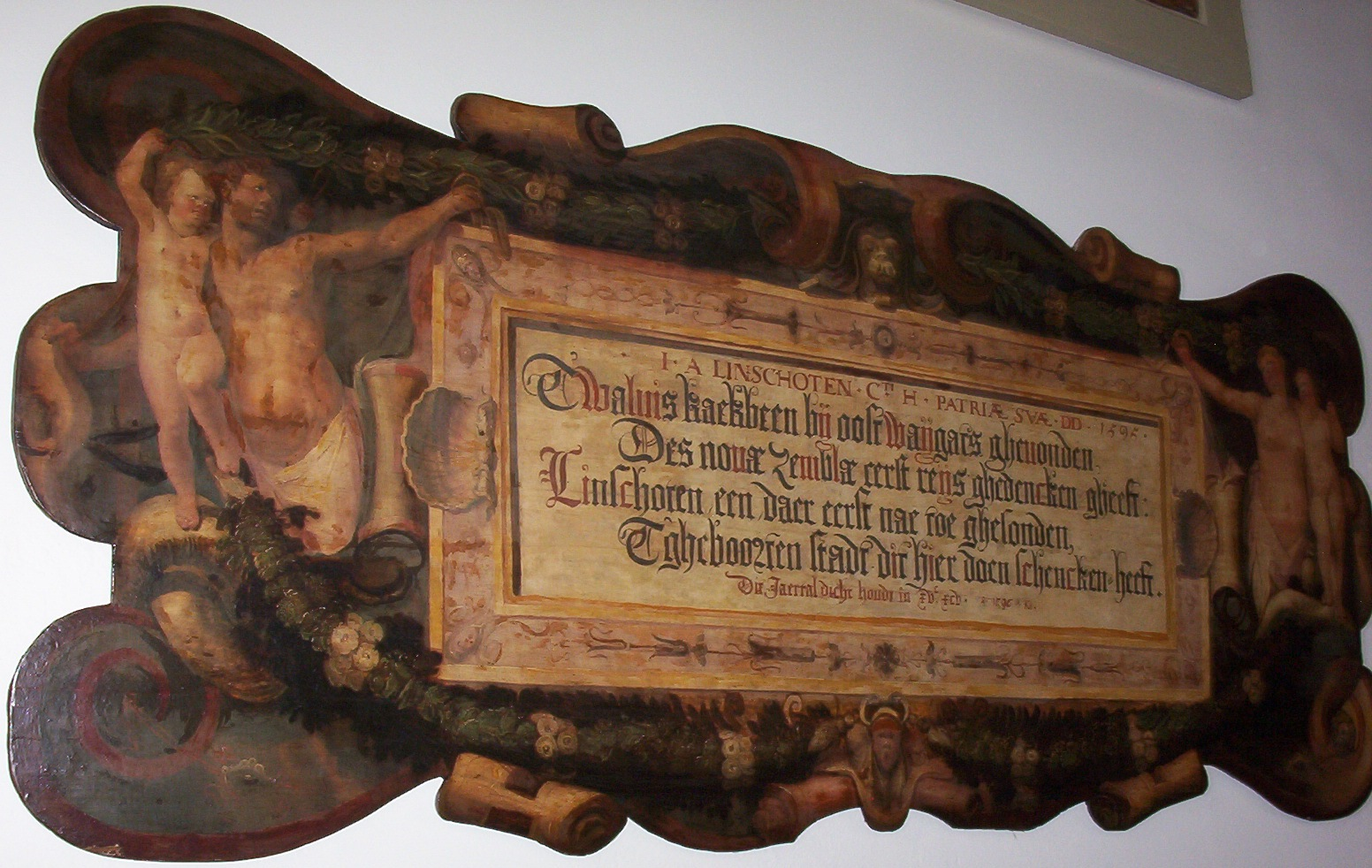
Plaque painted by Karel van Mander commemorating whalebone given to Haarlem by Jan Huyghen van Linschoten from Willem Barentsz expedition.

In June 1594, van Linschoten sailed from Texel in the expedition headed by Dutch cartographer Willem Barentsz. The fleet of three ships was to enter the Kara Sea, with the hopes of finding the Northeast passage above Siberia. At Williams Island the crew encountered a polar bear for the first time. They managed to bring it on board, but the bear rampaged and was killed. Barentsz reached the west coast of Novaya Zemlya and followed it northward, before being forced to turn back in the face of large icebergs.

== Barentsz Second voyage ==
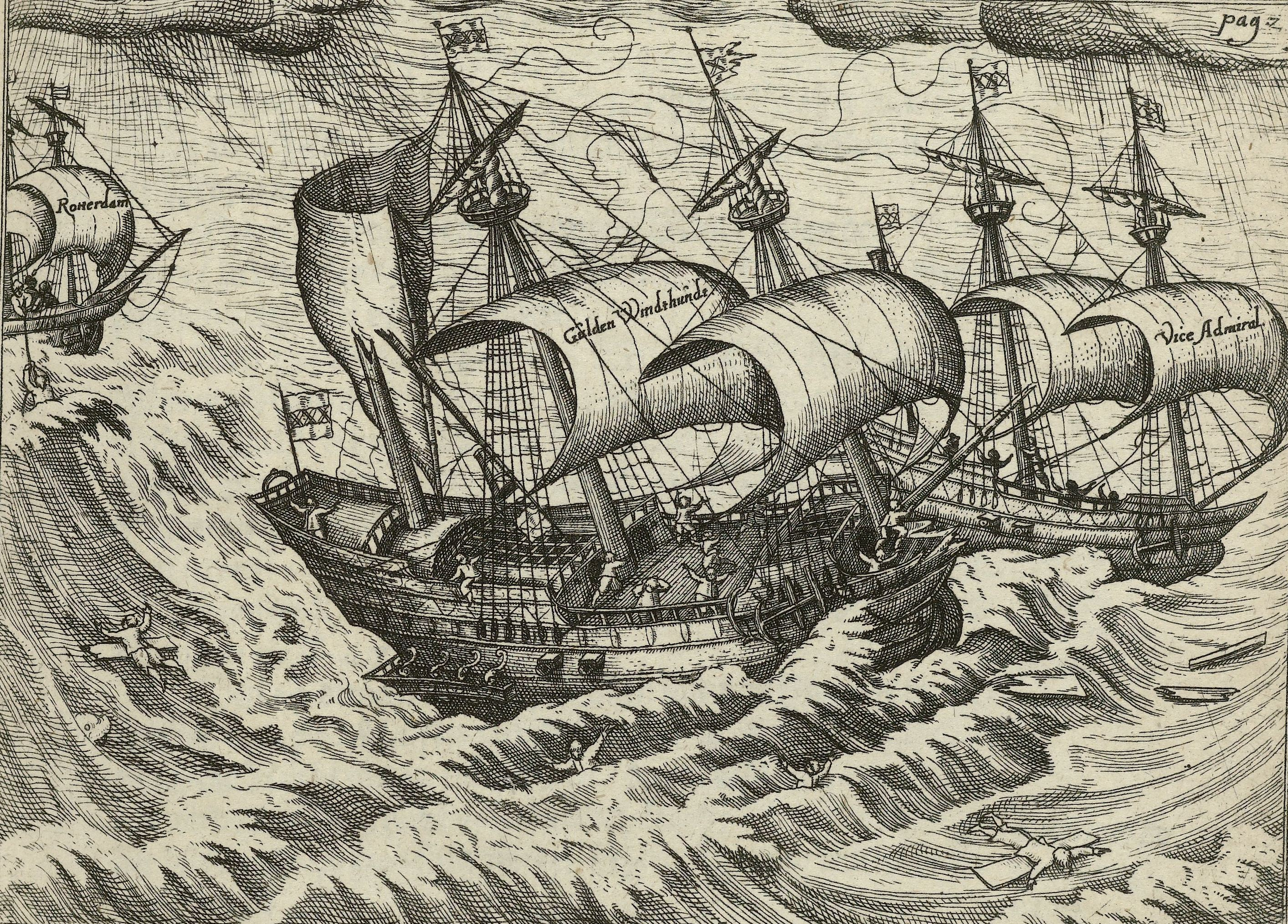
Barentz flagship Gulden Windthunde nearly collided with that of the Vice Admiral. Linschoten on the latter. 6 August 1595

The following year they sailed again in a new expedition of six ships, loaded with merchant wares that they hoped to trade with China. The party came across Samoyed "wild men" but eventually had to turn back when discovering the Kara Sea to be frozen. Van Linschoten was one of two crew members to publish journals about the Barentsz expedition.

== Return to Holland ==
In 1595, with assistance from Amsterdam publisher Cornelis Claesz, who specialised in shipping, geography and travels, Jan Huygen van Linschoten wrote Reys-gheschrift vande navigatien der Portugaloysers in Orienten (Travel Accounts of Portuguese Navigation in the Orient). This work contains numerous sailing directions, not only for shipping between Portugal and the East Indies colonies, but also between India, China and Japan. It also contains one of the earliest European accounts of tea drinking in Japan:

"Their manner of eating and drinking is: everie man hath a table alone, without table-clothes or napkins, and eateth with two pieces of wood like the men Chino: they drink wine of Rice, wherewith they drink themselves drunke, and after their meat they use a certain drinke, which is a pot with hote water, which they drink as hot as ever they may indure, whether it be Winter or Summer... The aforesaid warme water is made with the powder of a certaine hearbe called Chaa, which is much esteemed, and is well accounted among them."

In the same year, 1595, he married Reynu Meynertsdr. Seymens of Enkhuizen. She was "already four months pregnant by her intended second husband....At the time of her courtship Reynu Seymens was thirty-one and a mother of three. Her lover's voyaging career may well have hastened their consummation."

Jan Huygen van Linschoten also wrote two other books, Beschryvinghe van de gantsche custe van Guinea, Manicongo, Angola ende tegen over de Cabo de S. Augustijn in Brasilien, de eyghenschappen des gheheelen Oceanische Zees (Description of the Entire Coast of Guinea, Manicongo, Angola and across to the Cabo de St. Augustus in Brazil, the Characteristics of the Entire Atlantic Ocean), published in 1597; and Itinerario: Voyage ofte schipvaert van Jan Huygen van Linschoten naer Oost ofte Portugaels Indien, 1579-1592 (Travel account of the voyage of the sailor Jan Huygen van Linschoten to the Portuguese East India), published in 1596. "The frontispiece of the first edition [was] pirated [from] the engraving from (of all things) a work celebrating the campaigns of a Spanish general and printed...up as the Dutch hero" by his publisher Joost Gillis Saeghman. The map published in this book, Exacta & accurata delinatio… regionibus China, Cauchinchina, Camboja, sive Champa, Syao, Malacca, Arracan & Pegu, was prepared by Petrus Plancius.

An English-language edition of the Itinerario was published in London in 1598, entitled Iohn Huighen van Linschoten his Discours of Voyages into ye Easte & West Indies. A German edition was printed the same year. Considered very significant, it was published in Latin in Frankfurt, 1599; another Latin translation in Amsterdam, 1599; and in French in 1610.

The Itinerario continued to be re-edited after van Linschoten's death in 1611, until the middle of 17th century. Jan Huygen also published the Dutch translation of Father José de Acosta's book on Spanish America in 1597, and in 1601 he published an academic account of his own travels to the North. He joined the Dutch East India Company (VOC) in 1606. In 1609, he also published in Dutch the letter from the duke of Lerma, the King's favourite, to Philip III of Spain, about the Moorish revolt in Spain. That same year he was asked to give an opinion on foundation of the Dutch West India Company (GWC).

In addition to detailed maps of these places, van Linschoten also provided the geographic ‘key’ to unlocking the Portuguese grip on passage through the Malacca Strait. He suggested traders approach the East Indies from south of Sumatra through the Sunda Strait, thereby minimizing the risk of Portuguese intervention. This passage eventually became the main Dutch route into southeast Asia and was the origin of their colonization of the territories that form today's Indonesia.

This data was used extensively in the preparation of the first fleet for Asia, that of Cornelis de Houtman (1595-1597). Van Linschoten gave the route that de Houtman followed, sailing to the west of Madagascar on the way to Java island, which the Dutch would follow for many years, and he participated in the debates over the fleet's preparation and destination. Due to this, during his lifetime, van Linschoten engaged personally in polemics with Petrus Plancius, the later cartographer of the VOC, for the preparation of de Houtman's fleet, but also in his sailings North. He also worked closely with Lucas Janszoon Waghenaer and Bernardus Paludanus.

Van Linschoten died in Enkhuizen, where he had acted as Treasurer to the town since 1597.

== Legacy and honors ==
- The Linschoten Society (Linschoten-Vereeniging) was founded in 1908 to publish rare or unpublished Dutch travel accounts of voyages, journeys by land, and descriptions of countries.
- The minor planet 10651 van Linschoten is named after him.

== Editions ==
- 1598 English translation, John Huighen van Linschoten, His discours of voyages into ye Easte and West Indies: deuided into foure bookes, London: John Wolfe. online. In Wolfe's ordering, the First Book is the 1596 Itinerario, Second Book is 1597 Beschryvinghe, Third Book is the 1595 Reys-gheschrift and the Fourth Book is van Linschoten's translation of the revenues of the Spanish crown. In other editions, the 2nd and 3rd books are often switched around.
- 1598 John Huighen van Linschoten his Discours of Voyages into ye Easte & West Indies From the Collections at the Library of Congress
- 1874–85 English edition, The Voyage of John Huyghen van Linschoten to the East Indies, 1874–85 edition, London: Hakluyt. Reprint of only the First Book of 1598 translation ( vol. 1, vol. 2)

== See also ==
- Chronology of European exploration of Asia
- Francisco Gali

== Bibliography ==
- Boogaart, Ernst van den. Jan Huygen van Linschoten and the moral map of Asia. London: The Roxburghe Club, 1999.
- Boogaart, Ernst van den. “Heathendom and civility in the Historia Indiae Orientalis. The adaptation by Johan Theodor and Johan Israel de Bry of the edifying series of plates from Linschoten's Itinerario”, Netherlands Yearbook for History of Art, 53 (1), 2002a, 71–106.
- Boogaart, Ernst van den. Civil and Corrupt Asia. Word and text in the Itinerario and the Icones of Jan Huygen van Linschoten. Chicago/London: University of Chicago Press, 2003.
- Koeman, C. (1985). "Jan Huygen van Linschoten". Revista da Universidade de Coimbra. 32: 27–47.
- Masselman, George (1963). The Cradle of Colonialism. Yale University Press.
- Parr, Charles McKew (1964). Jan Van Linschoten : The Dutch Marco Polo. New York: Thomas Y. Crowell Company.
- Synge, J.B. (1912). A Book of Discovery. Yesterday's Classics. ISBN 1-59915-192-8. Archived from the original on 10 June 2011.
- "Willem Barentsz and the Northeast passage". University Library of Tromsø – The Northern Lights Route.
