= Palace of the Fortress =

Demolished viceregal palace in Goa, India

- Palácio da Fortaleza
- Historic view of the former palace complex in the City of Goa
- Alternative names: Palace of the Viceroys

General information
- Status: Demolished
- Location: Cidade de Goa, Portuguese India
- Year built: Late 15th century to early 16th century
- Demolished: 1820
- Owner: Kingdom of Portugal

Palace of the Fortress (Portuguese: Palácio da Fortaleza), also known as the Palace of the Viceroys, was the principal viceregal residence and administrative edifice of the City of Goa, in present day Goa, India. It stood on the banks of the Mandovi and developed from an ancient fort of the city. The complex included palace buildings that faced the Square of the viceroys as well as the Quay, and the Arch of the Viceroys, which was one of the principal gates to the city.

== History ==
The ancient City of Goa was conquered by the Bahmani king, Muhammad Shah II in 1469. Portuguese writer Duarte Barbosa, who speaks of the city at that time, wrote that "The city was very large and held well built edifices and handsome streets and squares, surrounded by walls and towers. There is a very fine fortress in it, and in the environs many gardens and orchards of fine trees and fruits. There were many mosques and houses of worship of the gentiles."

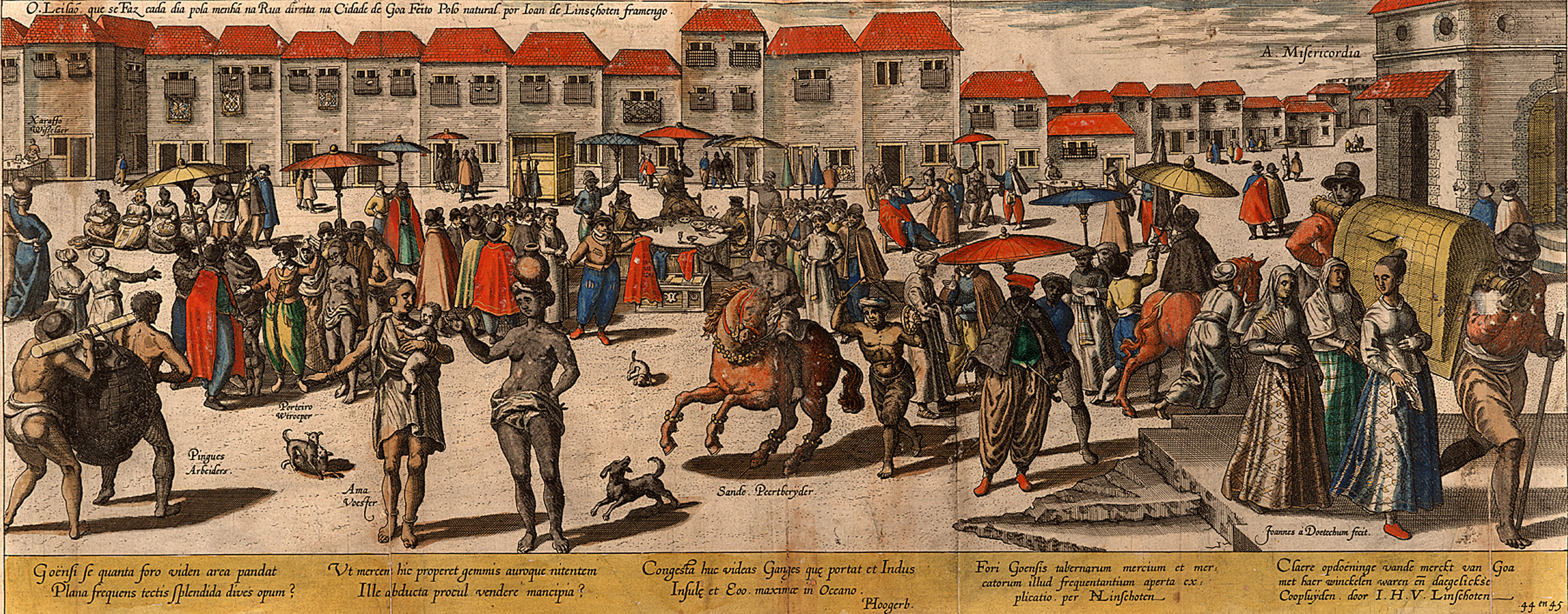
Auction Square at the city

Among the buildings that adorned the city, the most prominent were the chief mosque and the Palace of the Sabaio (The first Viceregal residence later on). Such was the state of the city, when Afonso de Albuquerque, impelled by the counsels of Timoja, conquered the city in AD 1510.

The Palace of the Sabaio, the first viceregal palace.

Soon after the conquest, Afonso de Albuquerque took on the general rebuilding of the city and restoration of its wall, which was already partly in ruins. This was also likely when the former fortress of Adil Shah was rebuilt. It was soon occupied by Rodrigo Rebello, first captain of the city, and was subsequently used by the captains of the ships. The viceroy, consequently, took up residence in the Palacio do Sabaio which was significantly larger and better built, having been the principal residence of Adil Shah, and which lay in a more central part of the city.

By the mid 16th century, the city had progressed greatly, both materially and culturally. Goa had officially become the capital of the eastern Portuguese empire and the crown elevated the city's status so that it received all of the privileges, statutes, ordinances and benefices common to Lisbon. Goa was also elevated to an archbishopric at this time (1557), and the city’s revenues had by then increased considerably.Its urban landscape, which until then differed little from its pre-conquest appearance, began gradually assuming a Portuguese character. Even as the city expanded, houses were being rebuilt in a more formal European manner. The government modified and rebuilt several existing structures, including the Sabaio palace, to reflect both the Lusitanian identity the city had acquired, as well as the immense revenues that the city received.

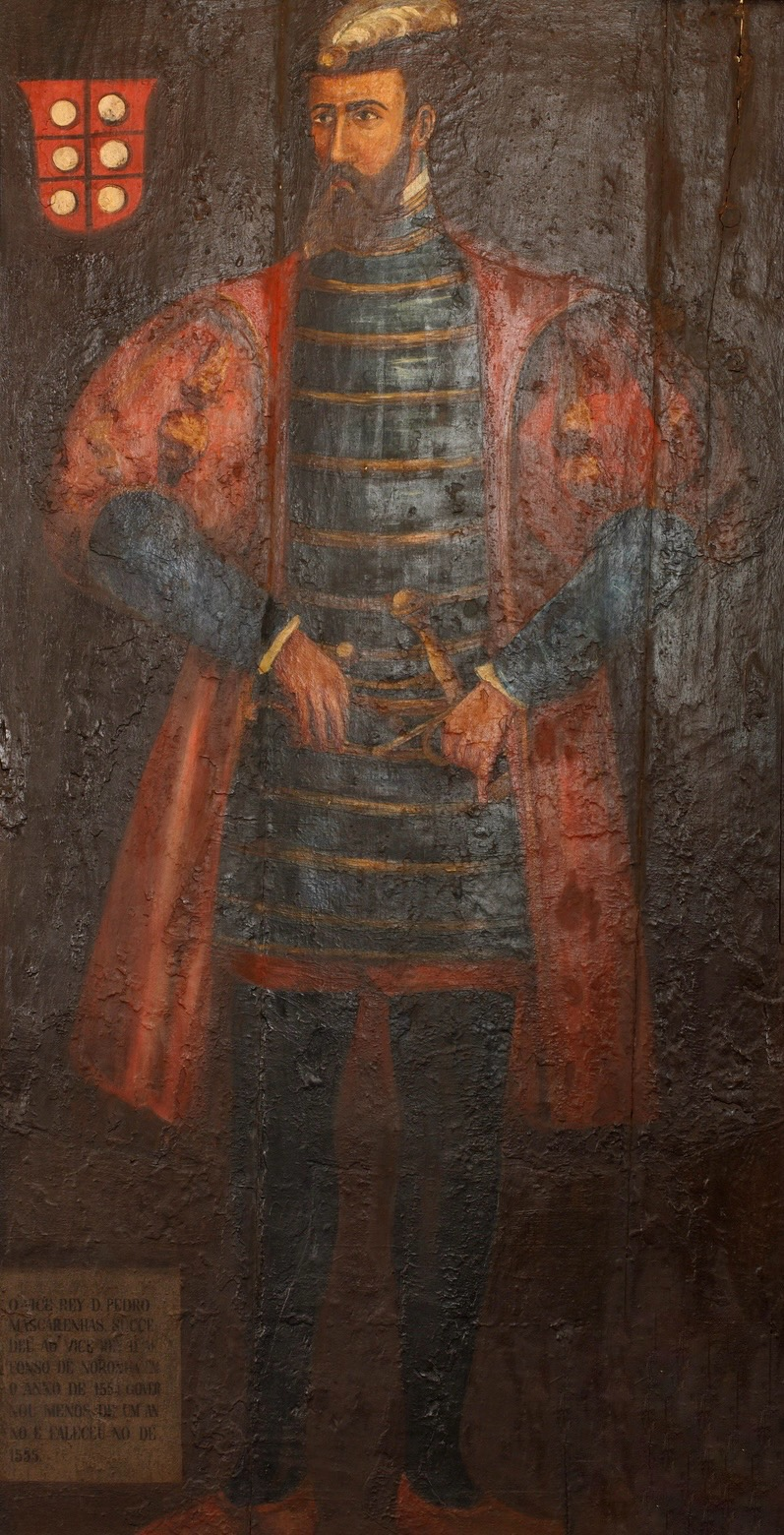
Portrait of Dom Pedro Mascarenhas

In 1555, Dom Pedro Mascarenhas, the sixth viceroy of Portuguese India, transferred his residence from the Palacio do Sabaio to this palace, The Palace of the Fortress (Also called the Vice-Reis palace). Although the definite motive for the decision is unknown, multiple sources claim that the Viceroy, 'who was considerably aged', found it difficult to ascend the numerous stairs of the Sabaio Palace. The location of the palace, which resembled the situation of the Ribeira Palace in Lisbon might have contributed to the viceroy's decision.

The Palace which had already been renovated and significantly enlarged would only continue to increment, becoming the most sumptuous and conspicuous building in the city.His successors continued to live there until 1695 when the Count of Vila Verde moved to Panelim (A suburb of the city, also called Sao Pedro) on account of the epidemics that ravaged the city, although important state business continued there. By the 1750's the city lost most of its urban fabric and had no significant population. The government had grown ignorant of the structures in the city, which was now largely deserted. The edifice fell partly into ruin and was demolished by order of the Council of the Public Treasury around the 1820s.

== Architecture ==
Layout of the primary floor

In the course of a century and a half, during which it served as the official residence to the viceroys of India Portuguesa, it was remodelled entirely in its aspects and dimensions, and is characterised as Late Manueline in urban and architectural styles

The palace faced south, where a large square, called the Terreiro do Paço lied. From this square a large staircase led to a spacious hall, which was adorned with the pictures of the ships that set sail for India since the time of Vasco da Gama. This hall gave way to a larger one which was decorated with the life size portraits of all the viceroys and governors of the city. It was in this hall that the viceroy received ambassadors from India, held his council, and where took place all the important affairs of state. The palace had several other quarters; for the administrative functions of state as well for the lodgings of the Viceroy and also contained chapels, water reservoirs and a part of the royal treasury.

Sketch of the entrance (circa 1775)

The main entrance opened into a large walled patio, where a broad porch with two flight of stairs. Massive stone columns supported the roof. Long columned verandas extended along the elevation on either side. Here, the city's aristocracy assembled on horseback and in great numbers during official ceremonies or when the viceroy appeared in public.

The Palace, in close proximity to the Quay of the viceroys, commanded a magnificent panorama of the river with its shipping and the Terreiro with all its bustling activity and was remarked for resembling the Royal Ribeira Palace of Lisbon.

=== Scissor truss roofs ===
One of the most distinctive feature of the palace and the buildings in the city were their peculiar steeply pitched, multi-sectioned hipped roofs known as telhados de tesoura (scissor roofs). The Jesuit priest Gaspar Dias, addressing a letter to Lisbon, noted the omnipresence of these structures in the architecture of the city of Goa, writing “…the houses have high, steep roofs in the manner of curicheus which look very well intertwined with the trees, it is very graceful; both the city and the island… ”

In addition to a symbolic function, scissor roofs were also practical, ventilating the interior as well as cooling it down. The very high pyramidical ceilings let hot air rise, creating a air current that cooled the interiors. As a complement to this system, the ceiling linings were perforated with a system of trusses or grids that facilitated air circulation and its passage to the outside through the gaps in the tiles. Its steepness would have also accelerated rainwater drainage.

== Viceregal residence ==
The viceroy of Goa lived here in regal splendour and maintained in the palace, his court in a style which rivalled some of the greatest in the kingdoms of the east.

His triumphant arrival in the city drew a magnificent ovation, as people of every class vied to celebrate the occasion amid joyful festivities. Large arches were erected from the Quay to the Cathedral, where after the usual ceremony of installation, the viceroy was escorted to the Palace amidst the acclamations of the people and the firing of canons. The viceoy served, generally for a period of three years.

The viceroy rarely stirred out of his palace, and when he did, he made a royal progress through the city. A day previous to his appearance in public, drums were beaten and trumpets sounded as a signal to the noblemen and the gentry to accompany him on the following day. Accordingly, early in the morning, about three or four hundred fidalgos and courtiers appeared at the Terreiro do Paço, clad in rich attire, mounted on noble steeds with gold and silver trappings, glittering with pearls and precious stones, followed by European pages in rich livery. With such a splendid cavalcade did the viceroy show himself in public. On ordinary days he had in his palace a guard of a hundred Portuguese dressed in uniform, who accompanied him in public.

In front of this palace stood the high court, on its right the chief jail, called 'Tronco' and the royal magazines to its left. Once so conspicuous in this quarter, hardly any vestige is left at present.

=== Carmelite Feast Celebrations ===

Pietro Della Valle, a traveller to the City of Goa during its palmy days provides us with a detailed description of the Carmelite festivities in Goa on the 20th of May 1623. The Discalced Carmelites had marked the canonization of their founder, Teresa de Avila, on which occasion two Portuguese boys, mounted on horseback and attired in travelling costumes were sent to this palace (The palace of the fortress) to announce to the Viceroy in verse the news of the canonisation. After this the two boys ran through the whole city singing, with a flourish of trumpets, while bells were rung not only in the Carmelite church but throughout the City.

== Ruin ==
"The rise and fall of cities, as of nations, is the work of time"; and Goa was no exception to this rule.

In the midst of all its pomp and splendour, the luxury and profusion, lay the inescapable seed of premature decay and dissolution. Soceity was almost rotten to the core. The civic virtues of Albuquerque and Castro were supplanted by corruption and venality, the martial spirit of the nation degenerated into effeminacy, sloth and indolence, as in the last days of the Roman Empire.

The decline of Portuguese power in the East may be traced in part to this demoralisation, which was of itself sufficient to undermine the empire and, with it, the prosperity of its capital. Yet other and weightier causes hastened the ruin. Chief among them was the war against the Dutch, who blockaded Goa in 1603, and although the city soon recovered, the struggle persisted for sixty-nine years, at the close of which the empire lay shattered and dismembered, and its once flourishing commerce was grievously crippled. Such afflictions could not fail to influence the destiny of Goa, which led to its poverty and decay.

In the midst of these troubles, the epidemic fever that had struck the city in the preceding century broke out again in 1635 with unprecedented violence, spreading devastation on every side. The government, having its resources drained by the war, was in no position to take effective measures against the disease, nor were proper standards of hygiene observed within the city. The chief funtionaries of state contented themselves with merely joining the clergy in imploring divine mercy.

In consequence of the general indigence and poverty, most of the private buildings which adorned the city began rapidly to decay for want of necessary repairs. An official document of 3 December 1687 records: “The greater part of Goa is abandoned because its inhabitants cannot rebuild their houses when they have fallen. Many streets once full of houses have now become lonely and uninhabited. It makes the heart bleed to see the metropolis of India so destitute of means as not to be able to maintain itself on its very foundation.” The Senate of Goa described the same condition, observing: “We see every day in the city houses falling into decay, not on account of the antiquity of the buildings, but for want of money.”

Recurring epidemics and the general poverty of the city led many of its inhabitants to abandon it. The first to depart were the noblemen, whose means allowed them to do so. Some settled in the suburbs of São Pedro or Panelim, which were in a better condition, while others withdrew to their country estates elsewhere. The central quarter was the most affected, and within it stood the palace of the fortress, which, though isolated in situation, still lay within the city proper.

The government considered transferring the capital to Mormugão, and the undertaking was pressed upon it by strict orders from Portugal, but the authorities at Goa were slack in their zeal and never took up the work with real diligence. In 1695 the Crown ordered the viceroy to withdraw to Mormugão, in the hope that the people would follow him. The Count of Vila Verde, however, finding these injunctions extremely difficult to execute, fixed his residence instead in the Casa da Pólvora at São Pedro, and was soon followed by the Archbishop and the rest of the nobility. The Palace commenced to decay at this time, Although its great halls and ceremonial rooms continued to be used for public and festive occasions till the early 19th century.

Around 1812, an estimate was made of the expenses to repair and preserve a section of the palace, which amounted to £2,732. But as this portion was considerably dilapidated, it was instead ordered to be demolished by the Council of the Public Treasury in 1820.

The turn of the 19th century saw the change of the Portuguese attitude towards the city, instead of pursuing a restoration, they began its deliberate destruction. Soon after the demolition of the Palace of the fortress, numerous other civil edificies, churchs and convents were raised to the ground. Those include the Palace of the sabaio, (Demolished on the same pretext of being too expensive to maintain), the Church of Sao Paulo Velho, the Convent and Church of Sao Domingo, the Senate, the church of St. Alexius and several other buildings. Most of which were already in crumbling ruins. Most of the buildings were demolished for their stone, which were used to raise new edificies in Panjim, the newer capital.

== See also ==
- Cidade de Goa
- Arch of the Viceroys
- Pelourinho Velho
- Viceroys of Goa
- Architecture of Goa
