= Market of Goa =

Engravings by Jan Huyghen van Linschoten

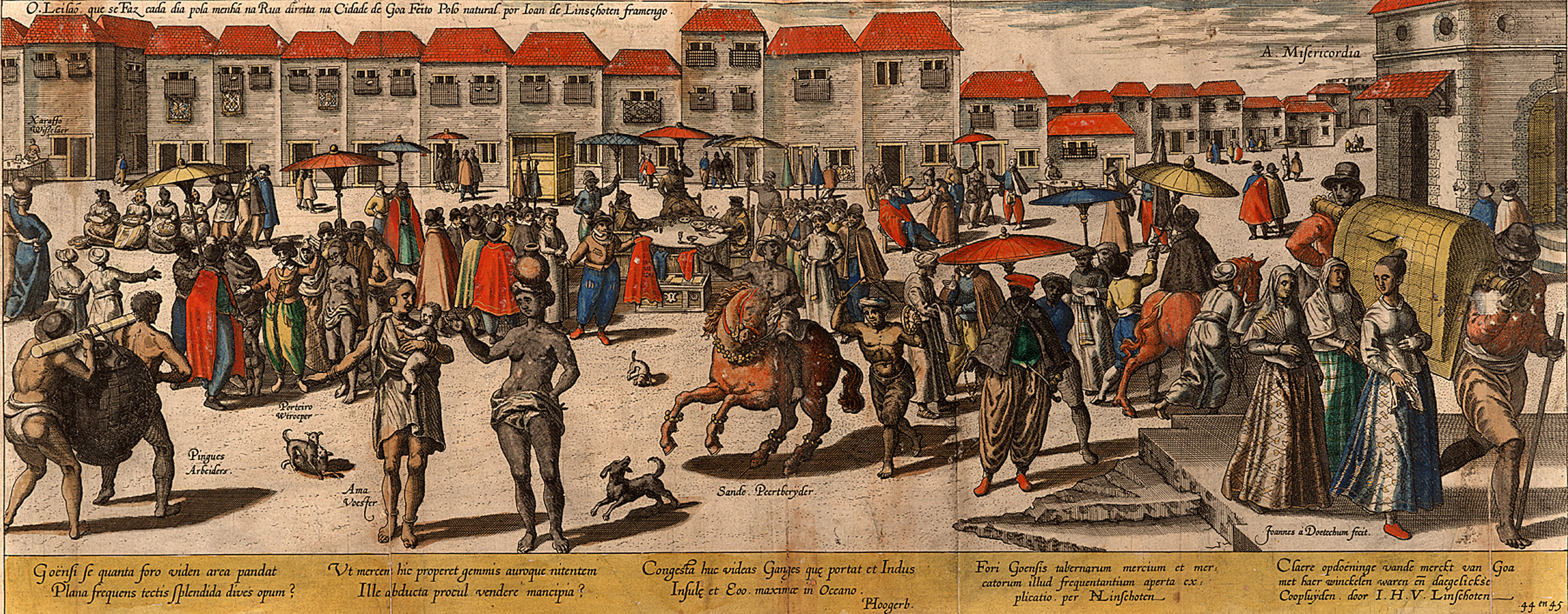
- Market of Goa print found in Jan Huygen van Linschoten's travel narrative Itinerario.
- Year: c. 1595
- Medium: Engraving

Market of Goa is Plate 5 in Jan Huyghen van Linschoten's Itinerario. The plate depicts the market in Goa, a region on the southwestern coast of India that was the center of maritime trade in Portuguese Asia. Itinerario is a book that includes detailed descriptions and thirty-six engravings of Jan Huyghen van Linschoten's observations of Goa and other Asian cities and islands.

== Background information ==
Jan Huygen van Linschoten's Itinerario, originally published in Amsterdam in 1595–1596 by Cornelis Claesz, recounts the journey of van Linschoten to the Portuguese governed city of Goa. Itinerario includes text of descriptions of thirty-six engravings, as well as maps that shown ship routes that were used by merchants. In Linschoten's words, the book is “a collection of the most memorable and worthiest things.”

Linschoten lived in Goa from September 21, 1583, to 1588. While there, he kept a detailed diary on his observations of the land, people and politics. If there was one thing that was evident to readers of Itinerario, it was "Portuguese imperial rule was slowly rotting." He also made sketches and likely collected sketches from others he encountered on his journeys. Itinerario is based on the sketches and observations he made. The book was translated into multiple languages, including English, French, German, and Latin by the 17th century.

Upon returning to the Netherlands, Linschoten worked with the Dutch engraver Johannes von Doetecum to create thirty-six plates that would accompany the text of Itinerario. The novelty of the Itinerario plates alone became an interest to potential buyers. Because of this, Claez published a new set of thirty of the original thirty-six engravings. Published in 1604, the new publication was titled Icones, habitus gestusque Indorum as Lustianorum per Indian viventium etc., or Icones for short. Alongside the images were much more detailed descriptions of Linschoten's journey. The new captions were acquired from the Latin translation of Itinerario.

== Visual analysis ==
Plate 5, Market of Goa, depicts the market in Goa, a region on the southwestern coast of India that was the center of maritime trade in Portuguese Asia. The Market of Goa depicts the bustling city of Goa, the center of maritime trade in Asia. Inscribed in Portuguese in the top left of the print is a description of the image. The Portuguese rua direita most accurately translates to "main street".

The plate is set up like a stage and represents a "theatre of social order and morality." The inequalities between slaves, merchants, and noblemen are evident based on their clothing (or lack thereof) and accessories. Italian, German, and Portuguese merchants gather in crowds to sell their goods. Captives, imported from Mozambique, are shackled to their owners or carry them in palanquins.

The print likely depicts the marketplace at morning. Trading was only allowed between the hours of seven and nine in the morning. The afternoon heat was too unbearable to work. Many figures can be seen taking shade under parasols to shield themselves from the scorching sun. Noblewoman can be seen being carried by slaves in palanquins.

Enslaved people were frequently sold in Goa. The average Goan household had about 30 slaves. Slaveowners made a hefty profit on the sale because slaves were given very little attention in regards to their health. Additionally, female slaves were sometimes forced to worked as prostitutes. Masters kept the profit these women made.

The minimal time to trade made for a crowded square. The market was set up like an auction. The bare-chested woman, arguably the focal point of the image, points at the child held by the wet nurse to her right. Just off the center of the image, a group of Portuguese men, one a money exchanger, can be seen sitting around a table, protected by parasols, and listening to a crier auctioning off what appears to be a cloak. In the lower left of the image, two men, Indian porters, carry a jug of water from the countryside. To the right of the porters, a crier auctions off a small dark-skinned child and a naked woman to a gathering of Portuguese men. Moving to the right of the image is a man riding a horse. Other various animals running amuck, adding to the chaos of the street. In the far right, a Portuguese nobleman on horseback and a Portuguese noblewoman in palanquin are seen leaving the market. The noblewoman's litter is carried by Asian or African slaves. As they exit, they will walk by a hospital—a structure that crudely divides the foreground from the background. In the far left background, a group of women sit in a semi-circle selling goods out of their baskets.

The mayhem and pandemonium are evident, but not representative in this plate is the way that the market was organized. Trades of similar classification were grouped together on the streets. Precious gems, golds, and silvers would be tabled near each other. Other goods included: Portuguese wines, fruits and vegetables, baked goods, herbs, medicines, textiles, embroidery, and wood carvings.

These images are "drawn from life" and are considered "counterfeits from life". It is important to keep in mind that the plates are based on the entries and sketches of Linschoten's observations, and not those of the engravers, so it cannot be said for certain that the engravers did not take artistic liberties.

Linschoten's observations were considered to have "high empirical content" and are an example of the mapping impulse common by the Dutch. The mapping impulse was a compulsion to document everything in an almost scientific manner.

== Credibility ==
Based on the ethnic clientele of Goa, it is plausible that Linschoten could have seen all the figures, fauna, and flora that appear in the plates. However, based on the diaries of Linschoten and the text accompanying the plates, it appears he did not visit all the locations of the objects in the prints. The captions of Itinerario makes it seem like Linschoten saw more of Asia than he really did. He may have spent time conversing with the diverse folk at the market and not only traded for goods but also knowledge of the geography and ethnography around Goa. There are also stereotypical elements that appear in the prints. For example, the plate that depicts the king of Cochin on an elephant appears to be Linschoten/Doetecum's play on common compositions used to depict Indian individuals in the art of 16th century Northwestern Europe.

The composition of the plates calls into question their accuracy and credibility. It is unlikely, based on his lack of formal art training, that Linschoten could create a sketch with a composition so balanced. Additionally, the Market of Goa, the huts in the background do not resemble traditional Asian huts. Figures and structures were likely added by Doetecum to construct a composition that was consistent with 16th century Dutch landscape art; Doetecum did collaborate with printer Hieronymus Cock on landscape backgrounds.
