= Fogaça (surname) =

Fogaça is a surname. Notable people with the surname include:

- Bruno Fogaça (born 1981), Brazilian football forward
- José Fogaça, Brazilian politician
- Júlio Fogaça, Portuguese communist
- Nathan Fogaça (born 1999), Brazilian football forward
