= Prajal Sakhardande =

Indian historian (born 1969)

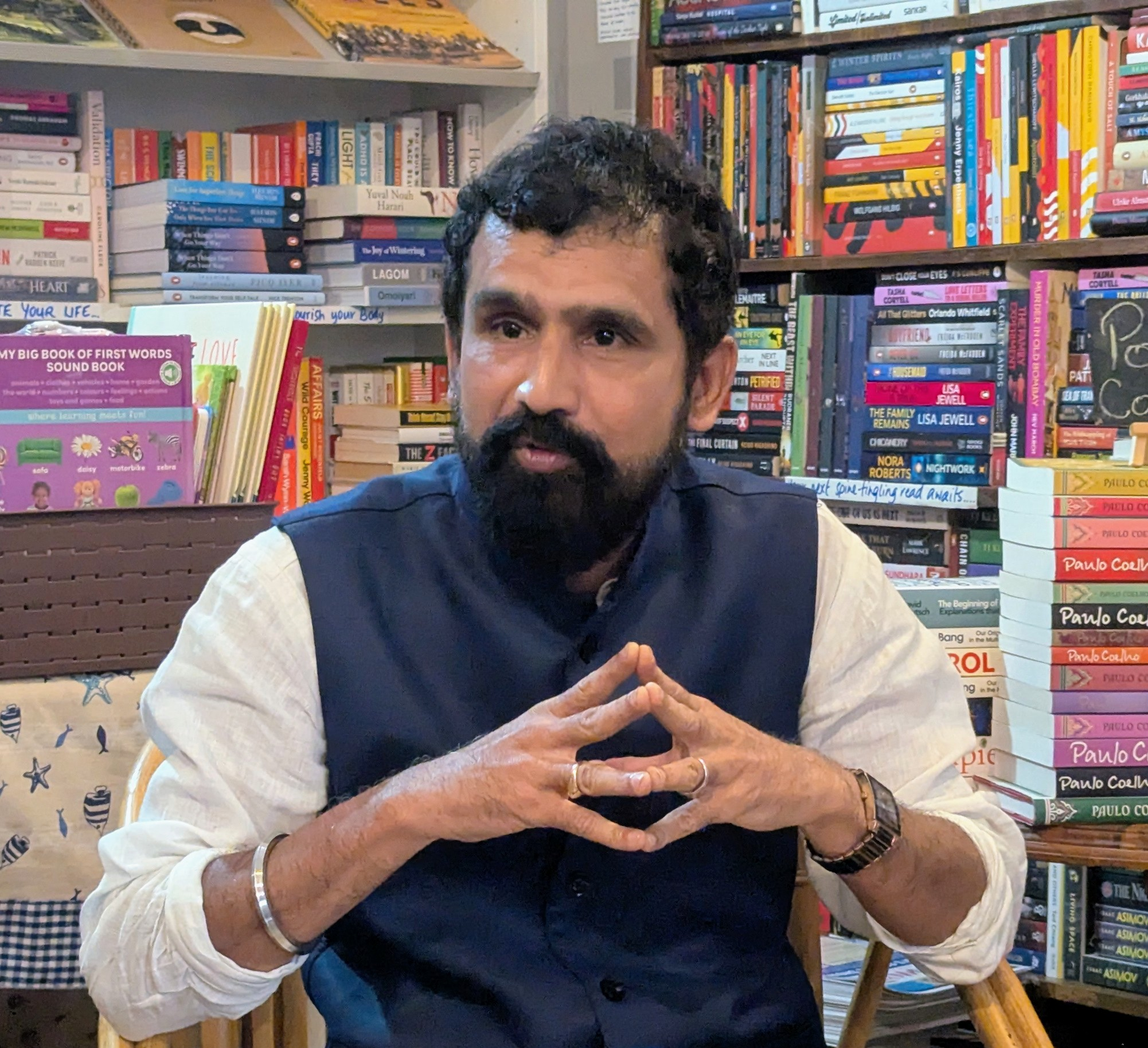
- Sakhardande in 2025
- Born: 18 April 1969 (age 57); Margao, Goa, India
- Occupations: Historian, writer
- Spouse: Anju Khaunte (m. 2001)

Prajal Sakhardande (born 18 April 1969) is an Indian historian, heritage activist, and academic known for his work in preserving the history and cultural identity of Goa. He is Head of the Department of History at Dhempe College of Arts and Science in Miramar, Panjim.

== Early and personal life ==
Prajal Sakhardande was born on 18 April 1969 in Margao to Arvind Sakhardande, a professor, and Milan Sakhardande. His interest in history began when he read comic book biographies of Mahatma Gandhi, Sarojini Naidu, Dadabhai Naoroji, and Swami Vivekananda, published by Amar Chitra Katha. One of his inspirations was Sardar Karnail Singh Banipal, a 21-year-old martyr of the Goa liberation movement.

Sakhardande married Anju Khaunte on 13 May 2001. In 2003, they had a son, Vishesh, who died shortly after birth.

== Academic career ==
Sakhardande teaches history, including Medieval Indian history at Goa University. He completed his M. Phil. in Pre-Portuguese Goan Heritage and, as of 2012, was pursuing a Ph.D. in Post-Liberation Political History of Goa.

In 2022, he was chosen by the Goa Board of Secondary and Higher Secondary Education to consult about the content of the History textbooks for Class IX.

== Heritage activism ==
On 30 September 2000, Sakhardande co-founded the Goa Heritage Action Group (GHAG) in response to increasing threats to Goa's built and cultural heritage. The group aims to protect historically and aesthetically significant buildings, sites, and artefacts. He has been active in campaigns such as Save Mhadei, Goa Bachao Abhiyan, and anti-SEZ protests. His weekly column Pages from the Past has contributed to raising awareness of Goa's monuments and historical legacies.

== Writing career ==
Sakhardande's first book was the 2012 Muslim History and Heritage of Goa. He then wrote a biography of Matanhy Saldanha, Matanhy Saldanha – the Legend. In 2019, he published Goa Gold Goa Silver: Her History Her Heritage – from Earliest Times to 2019, comprehensive overview of Goa's history, including cultural and political developments.

In 2023, Sakhardande co-authored a book, The Quest for Goa: History and Heritage of Goa from Ancient Times to 2019. His 2025 book, History of Women’s Contribution to Goa’s Struggle for Freedom (1928-1961), examines women’s contributions to Goan history, focusing on the importance of recognizing women's roles in shaping cultural identities.

== Publications ==
- Muslim History and Heritage of Goa (2012)
- Matanhy Saldanha – the Legend
- Goa Gold Goa Silver: Her History Her Heritage – from Earliest Times to 2019 (2019)
- Pages from the Past – A regular column authored by Sakhardande, featuring insights into lesser-known facets of Goan history.
- The Quest for Goa: History and Heritage of Goa from Ancient Times to 2019 (2023)
- History of Women’s Contribution to Goa’s Struggle for Freedom (1928-1961) (2025)

== Awards ==
Sakhardande has received multiple awards in recognition of his work in heritage conservation and education. These include:

- The State Teacher's Award, which acknowledged his long-standing contribution to teaching and historical research.
- The Goa State Cultural Award for his dedication to preserving Goa's built and cultural heritage.
- Several other honours from cultural and civic bodies for his activism, scholarship, and public engagement on issues related to Goa's identity and history.

== Philosophy ==
Sakhardande believes that heritage is a “positive legacy of history” and that preserving it is essential for future generations. He often quotes historian John Tosh: "The value of the past lies precisely in what is different from our world."

Critic and writer Dale Luis Menezes questions Sakhardande's take on Goan history, suggesting that he "seems to [give] merely an arbitrary opinion buttressed by a general desire to locate Goan authenticity in a pre-colonial Hindu past."
