= Johann Israel de Bry =

German engraver and publisher (c.1570–1611)

Johann Israel de Bry (c. 1570 – 1611) was a Franco-Flemish engraver and publisher. Born in Strasbourg, de Bry worked in Frankfurt am Main at his family's publishing business. He is less well known than his father, Theodor de Bry, or especially his brother, Johann Theodor de Bry.
