= Celsa Pinto =

Indian historian and educator (born 1951)

- Pinto in 2026
- Born: 1951 (age 74–75); Karachi, British India
- Occupations: Teacher, historian, government official
- Writing career
- Subject: History of Goa
- Notable work: Concise History of Goa

Celsa Pinto is an Indian historian, educator and author. She was the former Director of Education for the Government of Goa.

== Early life and education ==
Celsa Pinto was born in Karachi in 1951. At the age of 13 in 1964–1965, she and her family relocated to Goa. Pinto completed her Master of Arts in History at the University of Bombay in 1975, becoming the first Goan to earn a first-class honours in the subject. She later obtained a PhD in Goan history under the supervision of Teotónio de Souza.

== Career ==
Pinto taught in schools for 22 years before joining the Directorate of Education, Government of Goa in 1994. Despite early legal challenges, she steadily progressed in her career to become the deputy director and eventually served as Director of Education until her retirement in 2011.

=== Curricular development ===
In 2024, Pinto authored Building the Base: Preschool Curriculum for Teachers and Parents, a guide published by Goa 1556 that outlines developmental objectives and play-based methodologies for pre-primary educators and parents.

Pinto also led the committee that prepared Goa's Class IX history syllabus for the Goa Board of Secondary and Higher Secondary Education.

=== Authorship and research ===
Pinto's publications include Goa: Images and Perceptions Studies in Goan History, Trade and Finance in Portuguese India, Situating Indo-Portuguese Trade along with Tobacco Monopolies in Goa 1674–1856, and co-edited the book Indo-Portuguese History and compiled Concise History of Goa.

In a 2019 academic paper titled Profiling Karachi Goanness (1840s–1970s): Monuments to Goan Emigration and Identity, Pinto examined patterns of Goan migration to Karachi.

== Works ==
- Concise History of Goa (Goa University Press, 2002)
- Encapsulating History of Goa’s Generations and Eras (seven-volume series, 2019–2023)
- Building the Base: Preschool Curriculum for Teachers and Parents (Goa 1556, 2024)
