= Arch of the Viceroys =

Coordinates: 15.505811°N 73.913681°E

- Arco dos Vice-Reis
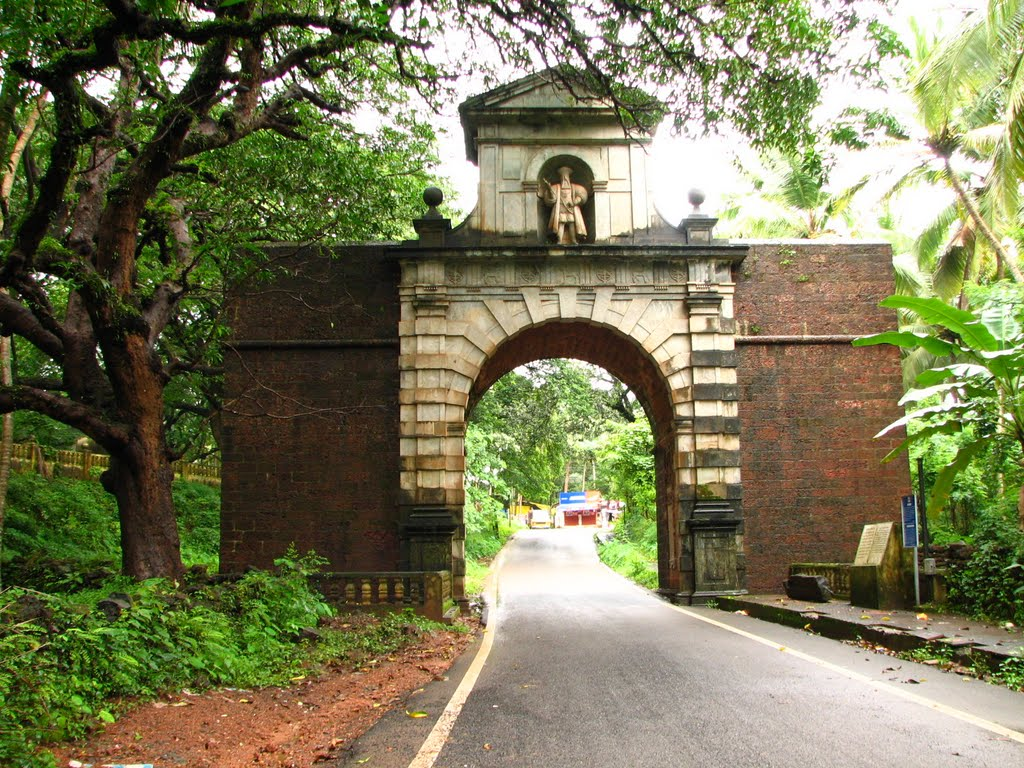
- Arch of the Viceroys in 2013

General information
- Architectural style: Roman triumphal arch
- Location: Goa, India
- Completed: 1599; 427 years ago

The Arch of the Viceroys (Portuguese: Arco dos Vice-Reis), also known as Viceroy's Arch, was erected in 1599 in Goa, Portuguese India, by Viceroy Francisco da Gama. It was erected to commemorate the discovery of the sea route to India by Portuguese explorer Vasco da Gama. It was constructed with black laterite stone and stands at 12 meters tall with a statue of da Gama above the key stone.

The arch was built over one of the five principal gates to the ancient fortified City of Goa (Cidade de Goa). On these fortifications was situated the Palace of the fortress or the Vice-Reis palace, a lofty edifice that lied directly above this arch. It was the seat of the government and the viceregal residence until 1695. The fortifications along with the palace fell into ruins following the abandonment of the city, and were demolished during the late 1820's.

The arch collapsed in 1948 and was rebuilt in 1954. It is now guarded by the Archaeological Survey of India (ASI) as a national treasure and is located alongside Old Goa's World Heritage Site with churches as part of Monument of National Importance in Goa.

== History ==
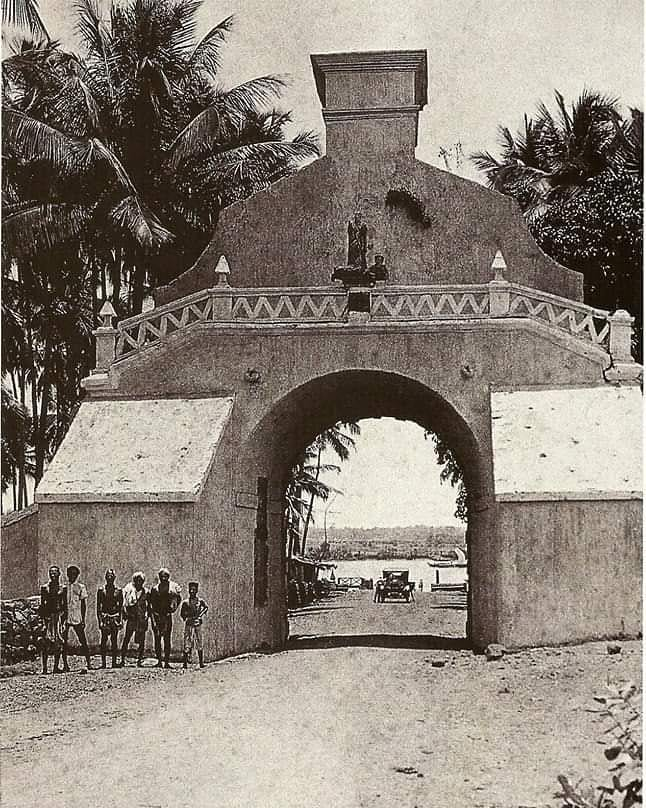
Viceroy's Arch in the 1940s

The Arch of the Viceroys was erected in 1599 under the direction of Dom Francisco da Gama, who served as the Viceroy of Portuguese India from 1597 to 1600. The arch was formally built over an already pre-existing gate to the Muslim City of Goa. The monument was commissioned to commemorate his great-grandfather, Vasco da Gama, who discovered the ocean route to India in 1498.

The arch served a direct connection between the riverside and the Rua Direita, the main commercial and ceremonial artery of the city. Crucially, it was integrated directly with the Palace of the Fortress (the Palácio da Fortaleza or Viceroy's Palace), a sprawling, lofty administrative complex developed from the former fortress. This grand palatial complex sat on an elevated position directly above and alongside the fortifications, housing state council halls, portrait galleries of the viceroys, and a private chapel, remaining in administrative use until its demolition in the 1820s.

== Recent Developments ==
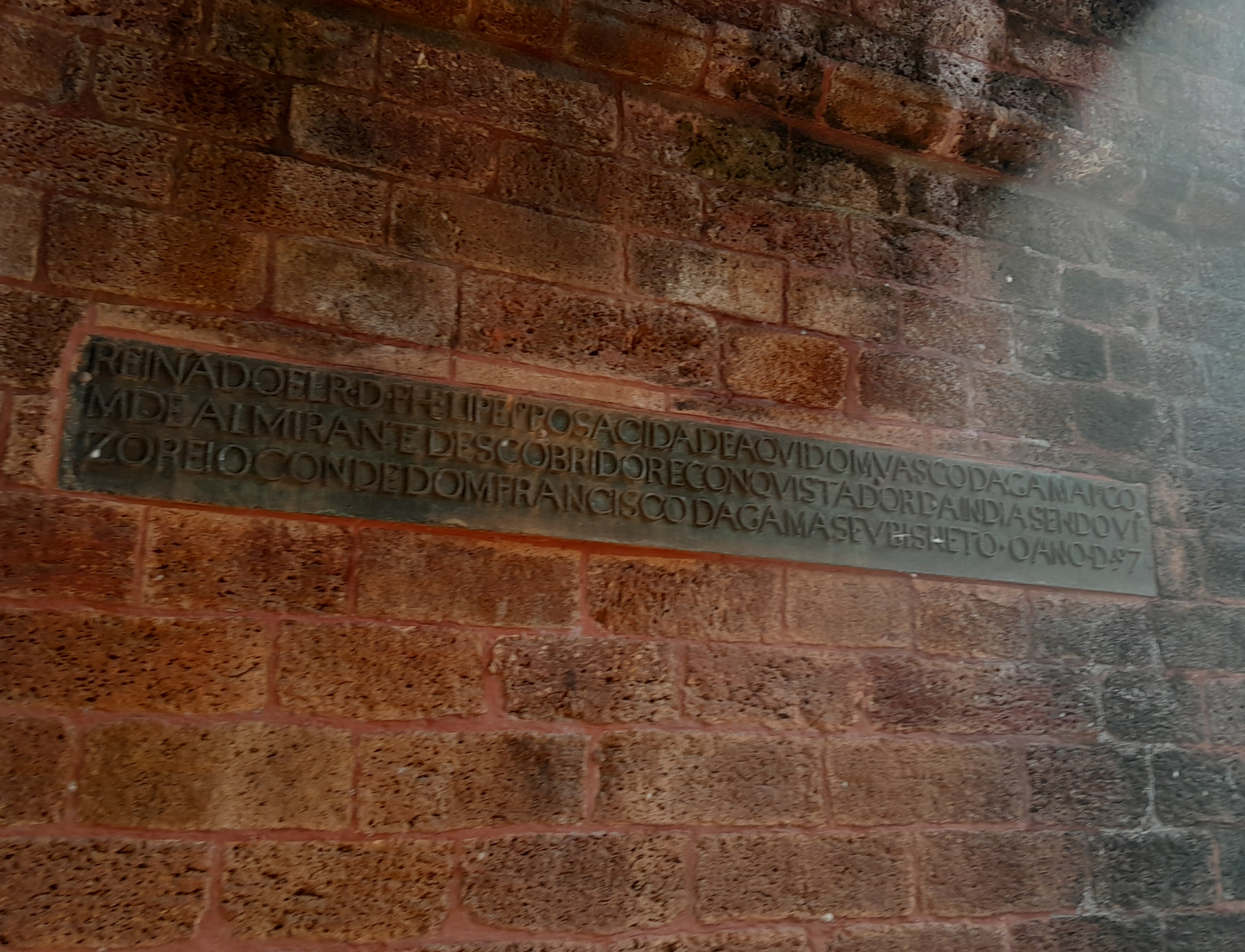
Portuguese inscription on the Arch of the Viceroys, Old Goa, stating Vasco da Gama's role in establishing the city of Velha Goa.

The Arch of the Viceroys has been taken over by Archaeological Survey of India in 1954 after its renovation and it was made part of Old Goa's UNESCO zone. The 2010 Ancient Monuments Act banned building within 300 meters, locking in its protection. In 2022, ASI renovated the arch and its surroundings with ₹20 lakh (US$21,000), adding weatherproofing.

== Inscriptions ==
The arch has a few epigraph inscriptions written in Portuguese and Latin. An inscription on a long horizontal plaque reads:

REINANDO ELREI D. PHELIPE 1º POS A CIDADE AQUI DOM VASCO DA GAMA 1º CONDE ALMIRANTE DESCOBRIDOR E CONQVISTADOR DA INDIA, SENDO VIZO‑REI O CONDE DOM FRANCISCO DA GAMA SEV BISNETO O ANO DE 97

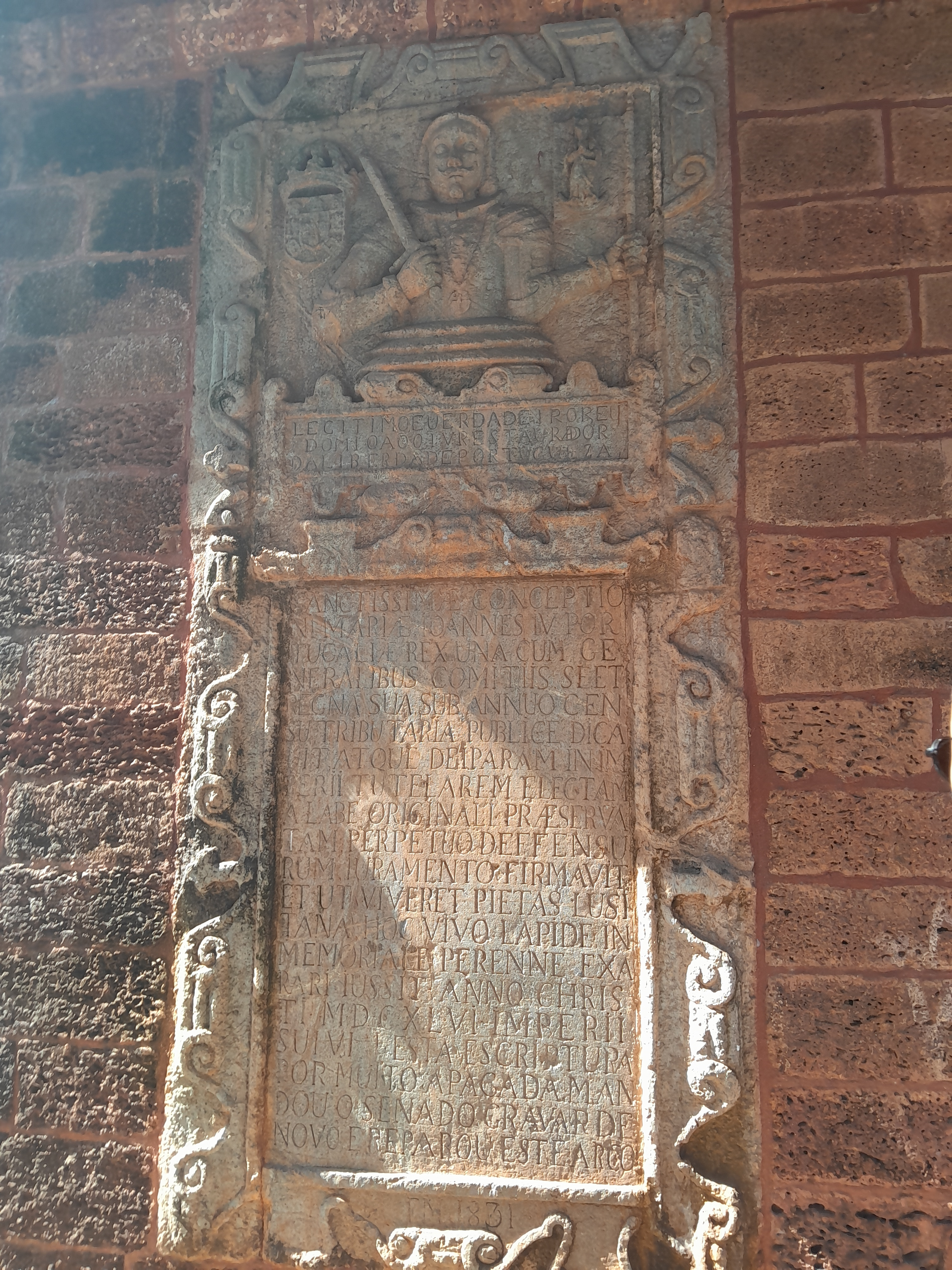
An epigraph in Latin on the Viceroys' Arch, Old Goa

Translation: "During the reign of King Dom Philip I, Dom Vasco da Gama, first Count, Admiral, discoverer and conqueror of India, established the city here; while his great-grandson, the Count Dom Francisco da Gama, was Viceroy, in the year (15)97."

The name of the architect is also mentioned:

„IVLIVS SIMON ING. MAG. INV.” (Julius Simon, Chief Engineer, designed [this arch]).
