= Sanjeev Sardesai =

Indian writer and historian (born 1960)

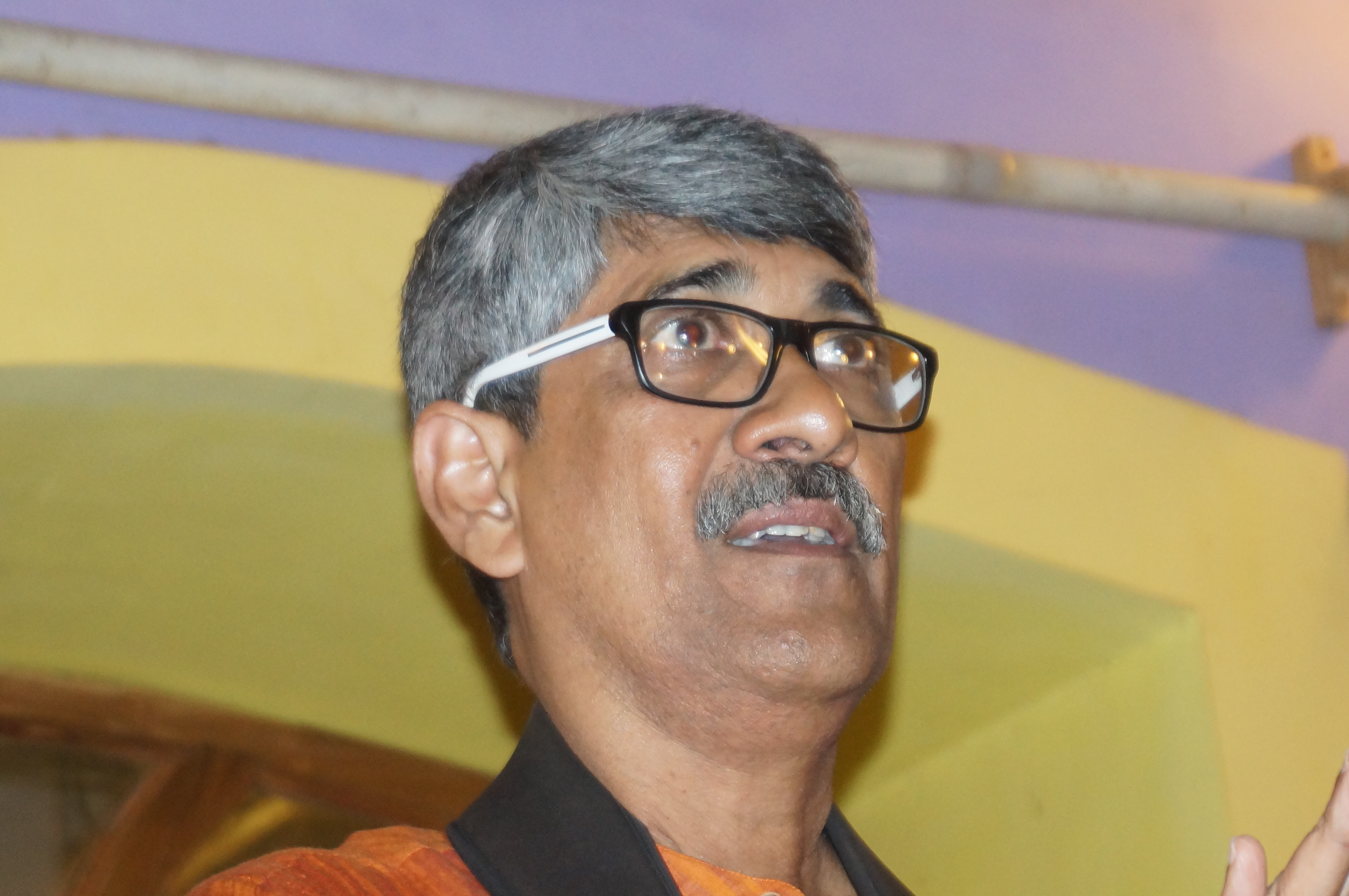
- Sardesai in 2017
- Born: 22 September 1960 (age 65); Mapusa, Goa, India
- Education: University of Mumbai (B.Sc. in Botany)
- Occupations: Historian; Heritage activist; Columnist
- Years active: 1982–present
- Known for: Founder of "Hands-On-Historians"; Heritage walks in Goa
- Spouse: Anita Sardesai
- Children: 1

Sanjeev Sardesai (born 22 September 1960) is an Indian historian, heritage activist, and columnist based in Goa. He is the founder of the "Hands-On-Historians" forum, an initiative aimed at promoting Goan history and heritage to the younger generation. Sardesai has served on various government committees, including the Goa Tourism Board and the drafting panel for the Goa Heritage Policy. He released his debut book, Ta' Mi Janai, in 2026.

== Life and career ==
=== Early life and education ===
Sardesai developed an interest in sports during his childhood. He participated in athletics, badminton, and hockey, representing his college at the university level. He graduated with a degree in Botany from the University of Mumbai in 1982.

=== Professional background ===
Prior to his work in history and heritage, Sardesai spent two decades working in the hospitality industry. He later established a business focused on signage design and fabrication, which catered to traffic and industrial requirements across Goa. In 2013, he retired from his commercial ventures to focus full-time on heritage activism.

=== Heritage activism and writing ===
Sardesai promotes the slogan "Go Goa, know Goa" and conducts heritage walks through various cities and towns in the state. He founded "Hands-On-Historians" to document Goa's history and disseminate it to students through presentations and lectures.

As of 2015, Sardesai was authoring a book titled Unlocking Goa – Heritage, History and Culture. He has also contributed columns to local publications. In discussions regarding the maintenance of historical sites, Sardesai has expressed support for the introduction of entry fees, provided that facilities are adequately maintained.

In July 2026, he released his debut book, Ta' Mi Janai, a collection of short stories covering different stories from Goa.

== Public service ==
Sardesai has been appointed to several state boards and committees by the Government of Goa. He served as a consulting coordinator for the Corporation of the City of Panaji (CCP), where he worked on traffic management and road safety in coordination with the Goa Police Traffic Cell. He was also a member of the Goa State Committee for the Rehabilitation of the Reis Magos Fort and the Institute of Road Safety Education (IRTE).

In 2022, the state government appointed him as a subject matter expert to the Goa Tourism Board. In April 2025, he was named as a member of the drafting panel constituted to formulate the Goa Heritage Policy, which focuses on preserving historical private homes and cultural assets.
