= Afonso de Albuquerque =

Portuguese general and conquistador (1453–1515)

Duke of Goa Afonso de Albuquerque
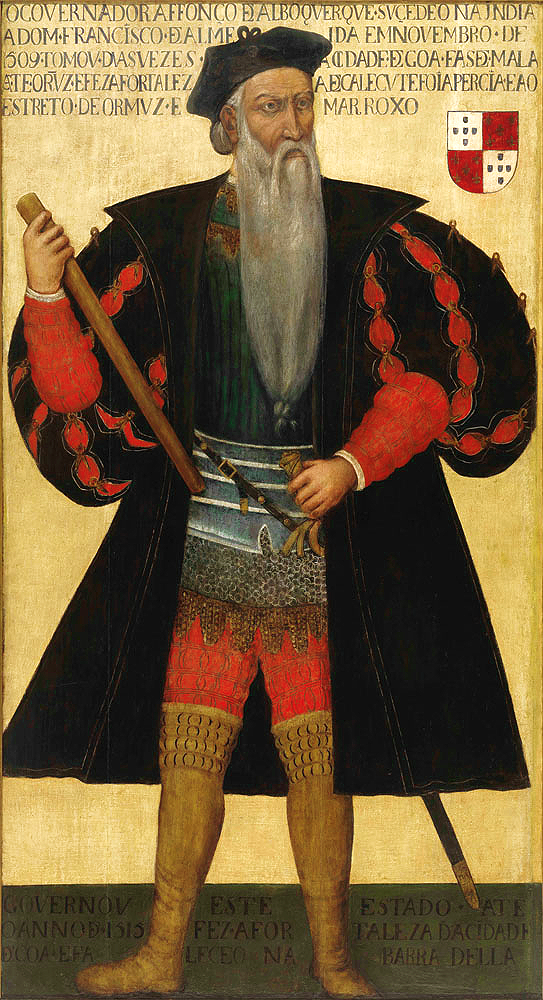
- Portrait of Afonso de Albuquerque

2nd Viceroy of Portuguese India
- In office 4 November 1509 – 8 September 1515
- Monarch: Manuel I
- Preceded by: Francisco de Almeida
- Succeeded by: Lopo Soares de Albergaria

Personal details
- Pronunciation: Portuguese: [ɐˈfõsu ðɨ alβuˈkɛɾkɨ]
- Born: c. 1453 Alhandra, Portugal
- Died: 16 December 1515 (aged 61–62) Offshore Goa, India
- Resting place: Graça Convent
- Children: Brás de Albuquerque
- Occupation: Admiral; Governor of India
- Nickname(s): O Terríbil (the Terrible); O Grande (The Great)

Military service
- Battles/wars: Conquest of Tangier; Conquest of Asilah; Battle of Toro; Conquest of Hormuz; Conquest of Goa; Conquest of Malacca; Siege of Aden

Afonso de Albuquerque, 1st Duke of Goa (c. 1453 – 16 December 1515), was a Portuguese general, admiral, statesman, and conquistador. He served as viceroy of Portuguese India from 1509 to 1515, during which he expanded Portuguese influence across the Indian Ocean and built a reputation as a fierce and skilled military commander.

Albuquerque advanced the three-fold Portuguese grand scheme of combating Islam, spreading Christianity, and securing the trade of spices by establishing a Portuguese Asian empire. Among his achievements, Albuquerque managed to conquer Goa and was the first European of the Renaissance to raid the Persian Gulf, and he led the first voyage by a European fleet into the Red Sea. He is generally considered a highly effective military commander, and "probably the greatest naval commander of the age", given his successful strategy of attempting to close all the Indian Ocean naval passages to the Atlantic, Red Sea, Persian Gulf, and to the Pacific, transforming it into a Portuguese mare clausum. He was appointed head of the "fleet of the Arabian and Persian sea" in 1506.

Many of the conflicts in which he was directly involved took place in the Indian Ocean, in the Persian Gulf regions for control of the trade routes, and on the coasts of India. His military brilliance in these initial campaigns enabled Portugal to become the first global empire in history. He led the Portuguese forces in numerous battles, including the conquest of Goa in 1510 and the capture of Malacca in 1511.

During the last five years of his life, he turned to administration, where his actions as the second governor of Portuguese India were crucial to the longevity of the Portuguese Empire. He oversaw expeditions that resulted in establishing diplomatic contacts with the Ayutthaya Kingdom through his envoy Duarte Fernandes, with Pegu in Myanmar, and Timor and the Moluccas through a voyage headed by António de Abreu and Francisco Serrão. He laid the path for European trade with Ming China through Rafael Perestrello. He also aided in establishing diplomatic relations with Ethiopia, and established diplomatic ties with Persia during the Safavid dynasty.

Throughout his career, he received epithets such as "the Terrible", "the Great", "the Lion of the Seas", "the Portuguese Mars", and "the Caesar of the East".

== Early life ==
Afonso de Albuquerque was born in 1453 in Alhandra, near Lisbon. He was the second son of Gonçalo de Albuquerque, Lord of Vila Verde dos Francos, and Dona Leonor de Menezes. His father held an important position at court and was connected by remote illegitimate descent with the Portuguese monarchy. He was a descendant of King Denis's illegitimate son, Afonso Sanches, Lord of Albuquerque. He was educated in mathematics and Latin at the court of Afonso V of Portugal, where he befriended Prince John, the future King John II of Portugal.

== Early military service, 1471–1509 ==
In 1471, under the command of Afonso V, he was present at the conquest of Tangier and Arzila in Morocco, and he served there as an officer for some years. In 1476, he accompanied Prince John in wars against Castile, including the Battle of Toro. He participated in the campaign on the Italian peninsula in 1480 to assist Ferdinand I of Naples in repelling the Ottoman invasion of Otranto. On his return in 1481, when John was crowned as King John II, Albuquerque was made master of the horse and chief equerry (estribeiro-mor) to the king, a post which he held throughout John's reign. In 1489, he returned to military campaigning in North Africa, as commander of defense in the Graciosa fortress, an island in the river Luco near the city of Larache. In 1490 Albuquerque was part of the guard of John II. He returned to Arzila in 1495, where his younger brother Martim died fighting by his side.

=== First expedition to India, 1503 ===
When King Manuel I of Portugal ascended to the throne following the death of his cousin John II, he held a cautious attitude towards Albuquerque, who was a close friend of his predecessor and seventeen years Manuel's senior. Eight years later, on 6 April 1503 Albuquerque was sent on his first expedition to India together with his cousin Francisco de Albuquerque. Each commanded three ships, sailing with Duarte Pacheco Pereira and Nicolau Coelho. They engaged in several battles against the forces of the Zamorin of Calicut (Calecute, Kozhikode) and succeeded in establishing the king of Cochin (Cochim, Kochi) securely on his throne. In return, the king of Cochin gave the Portuguese permission to build the Portuguese fort Immanuel (Fort Kochi) and establish trade relations with Quilon (Coulão, Kollam). This laid the foundation for the eastern Portuguese Empire.

== Second expedition to India, 1506–1509 ==
=== Return, 1506 ===
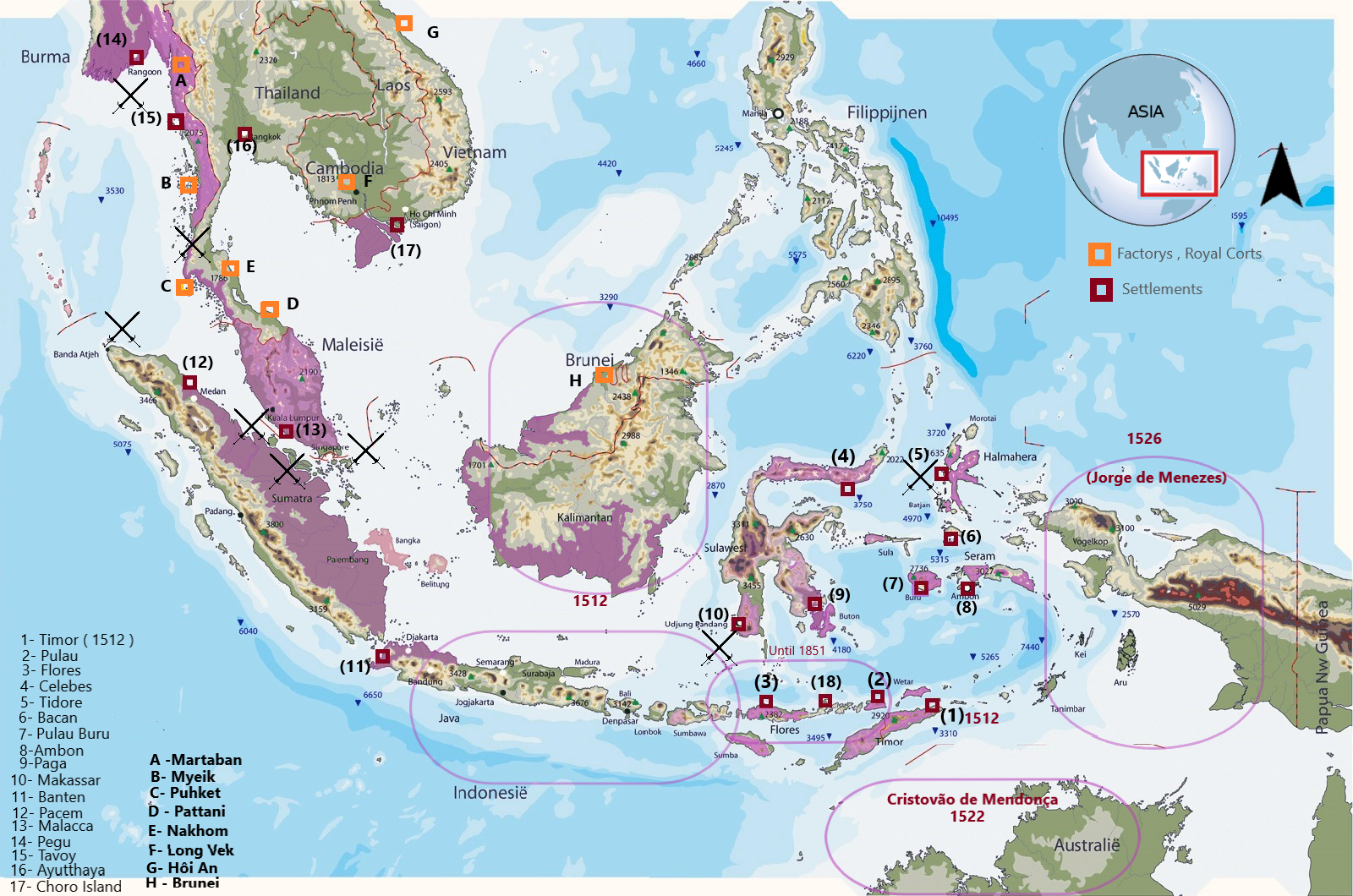
Evolution of the Portuguese Empire in Southeast Asia from 1511 to 1975.

Coat of arms of Albuquerque

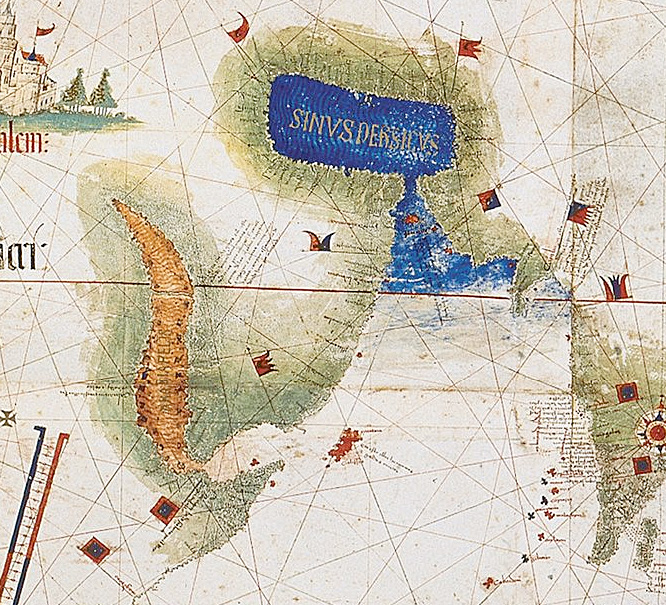
Map of the Arabian Peninsula showing the Red Sea with Socotra island (red) and the Persian Gulf (blue) with the Strait of Hormuz (Cantino planisphere, 1502)

Albuquerque returned home in July 1504 and was well received by King Manuel I. After he assisted with the creation of a strategy for the Portuguese efforts in the east, King Manuel entrusted him with the command of a squadron of five vessels in the fleet of sixteen sailing for India in early 1506, headed by Tristão da Cunha. The aim of the expedition was to conquer Socotra and build a fortress there, hoping to close the trade in the Red Sea.

Albuquerque went as "chief-captain for the Coast of Arabia", sailing under da Cunha's orders until reaching Mozambique. He carried a sealed letter with a secret mission ordered by the king: after fulfilling the first mission, he was to replace the first viceroy of India, Francisco de Almeida, whose term ended two years later. Before departing, he legitimized his son Brás ("Braz" in the old Portuguese spelling), born to a common Portuguese woman named Joana Vicente in 1500.

=== First conquest of Socotra, Muscat and Ormuz, 1507 ===
The fleet left Lisbon on 6 April 1506. Albuquerque piloted his ship himself, having lost his appointed pilot on departure. In Mozambique Channel, they rescued Captain João da Nova, who had encountered difficulties on his return from India; da Nova and his ship, the Flor de la mar, joined da Cunha's fleet. From Malindi, da Cunha sent envoys to Ethiopia, which at the time was thought to be closer to India than it actually is, under the aegis of Albuquerque. After failing to reach Ethiopia, he managed to land the envoys in Filuk. After successful attacks on Arab cities on the East African coast, the expedition conquered the island of Socotra and built a fortress at Suq, hoping to establish a base to stop the Red Sea commerce to the Indian Ocean. However, Socotra was abandoned four years later, as it was eventually realised to be a poor location for a base.

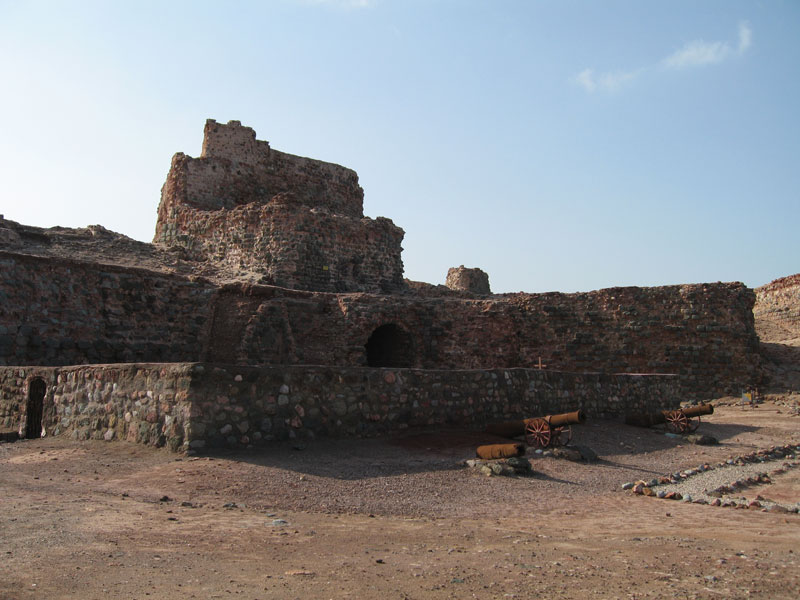
The Fort of Our Lady of the Conception, Hormuz Island, Iran

At Socotra, they parted ways: Tristão da Cunha sailed for India, where he would relieve the Portuguese besieged at Cannanore, while Afonso took seven ships and 500 men to Ormuz in the Persian Gulf, one of the chief eastern centers of commerce. On his way, he conquered the cities of Curiati (Kuryat), Muscat in July 1507, and Khor Fakkan, accepting the submission of the cities of Kalhat and Sohar. He arrived at Hormuz on 25 September and soon captured the city, which agreed to become a tributary state of the Portuguese king.

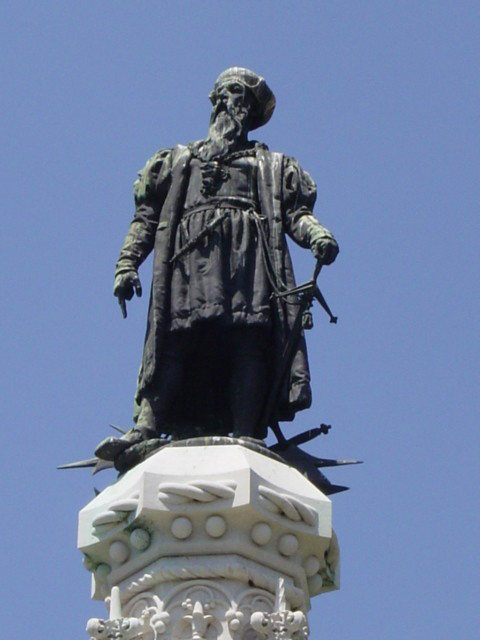
Statue of Afonso de Albuquerque, symbolically standing on a stack of weapons, referencing his reply in Hormuz

Ormuz was then a tributary state of Shah Ismail I (r. 1501–1524) of Safavid Persia. In a famous episode, shortly after its conquest, Albuquerque was confronted by Persian envoys, who demanded the payment of the due tribute from him instead. He ordered them to be given a stock of cannonballs, arrows and weapons, retorting that "such was the currency struck in Portugal to pay the tribute demanded from the dominions of King Manuel". According to Brás de Albuquerque, it was Shah Ismael who first addressed Albuquerque as "Lion of the seas".

Afonso began building the Fort of Our Lady of Victory (later renamed Fort of Our Lady of the Conception) on Hormuz Island, engaging his men of all ranks in the work. However, some of his officers, claiming that Afonso was exceeding his orders, revolted against the heavy work and climate and departed for India. With his fleet reduced to two ships and left without supplies, he was unable to maintain his position. In January 1508, he was forced to abandon Ormuz. He raided coastal villages to resupply the settlement of Socotra, returned to Ormuz, and then headed to India.

=== Arrest at Cannanore, 1509 ===
Afonso arrived at Cannanore on the Malabar coast in December 1508, where he opened the sealed letter that he had received from the king before the viceroy, Dom Francisco de Almeida, which named him as governor to succeed Almeida. The viceroy, supported by the officers who had abandoned Afonso at Ormuz, had a matching royal order but declined to yield. He protested that his term ended only in January and stated his intention to avenge his son's death by fighting the Mamluk fleet of Mirocem, refusing Afonso's offer to fight the Mamluk fleet himself. Afonso avoided confrontation, which could have led to civil war, and moved to Kochi, India, to await further instruction from the king. Increasingly isolated, he wrote to Diogo Lopes de Sequeira, who arrived in India with a new fleet, but was ignored as Sequeira joined Almeida. At the same time, Afonso refused approaches from opponents of Almeida who encouraged him to seize power.

On 3 February 1509, Almeida fought the naval Battle of Diu against a joint fleet of Mamluks, Ottomans, the Zamorin of Calicut, and the Sultan of Gujarat. His victory was decisive: the Ottomans and Mamluks abandoned the Indian Ocean, easing the way for Portuguese rule there for the next century. In August, after a petition from Afonso's former officers with the support of Diogo Lopes de Sequeira claiming him unfit for governance, Afonso was sent in custody to St. Angelo Fort in Cannanore. There he remained under what he considered as imprisonment.

== Governor of Portuguese India, 1509–1515 ==
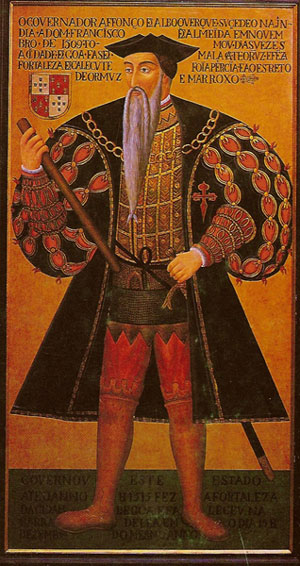
Afonso de Albuquerque as Governor of India

Afonso was released after three months' confinement, on the arrival at Cannanore of the Marshal of Portugal Fernando Coutinho with a large fleet sent by the king. Coutinho was the most important Portuguese noble to visit India up to that point. He brought an armada of fifteen ships and 3,000 men to defend Afonso's rights, and to take Calicut.

On 4 November 1509, Afonso became the second Governor of Portuguese India, a position he would hold until his death. Almeida set off to return to Portugal, but he was killed before he got there in a skirmish with the Khoekhoe. Upon his assuming office, Afonso intended to dominate the Muslim world and control the spice trade.

Initially, King Manuel I and his council in Lisbon tried to distribute the power by outlining three areas of jurisdiction in the Indian Ocean. In 1509, the nobleman Diogo Lopes de Sequeira was sent with a fleet to Southeast Asia, to seek an agreement with Sultan Mahmud Shah of Malacca, but failed and returned to Portugal. To Jorge de Aguiar was given the region between the Cape of Good Hope and Gujarat. He was succeeded by Duarte de Lemos, but left for Cochin and then for Portugal, leaving his fleet to Afonso.

=== Conquest of Goa, 1510 ===
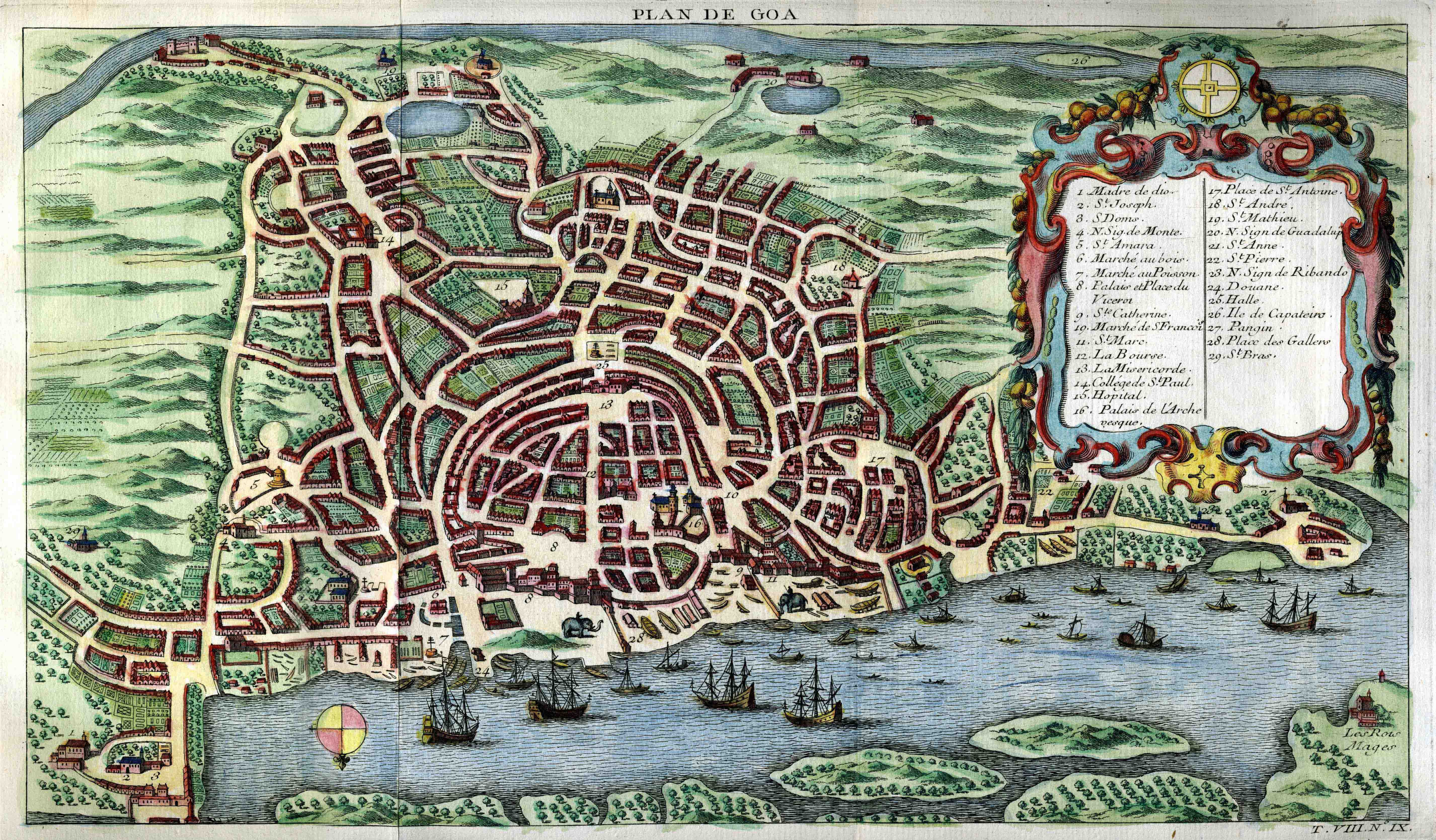
Illustration depicts the aftermath of the Portuguese conquest of Goa, from the forces of Yusuf Adil Shah.

In January 1510, obeying the orders from the king and aware of the absence of the Zamorin, Afonso advanced on Calicut. The attack was initially successful, but unravelled when Marshal Coutinho, infuriated by Albuquerque's success against Calicut and desiring glory for himself, attacked the Zamorin's palace against Albuquerque's advice, and was ambushed. During the retreat, Afonso was badly wounded and was forced to flee to the ships, barely escaping with his life, while Coutinho was killed.

Soon after the failed attack, Afonso assembled a fleet of 23 ships and 1200 men. Contemporary reports state that he wanted to fight the Egyptian Mamluk Sultanate fleet in the Red Sea or return to Hormuz. However, he had been informed by Timoji (a privateer in the service of the Hindu Vijayanagara Empire) that it would be easier to fight them in Goa, where they had sheltered after the Battle of Diu, and also of the illness of the Sultan Yusuf Adil Shah, and war between the Deccan sultanates. So he relied on surprise in the capture of Goa from the Sultanate of Bijapur.

A first assault took place in Goa from 4 March to 20 May 1510. After the initial occupation, feeling unable to hold the city given the poor condition of its fortifications, the cooling of Hindu residents' support and insubordination among his ranks following an attack by Ismail Adil Shah, Afonso refused a truce offered by the Sultan and abandoned the city in August. His fleet was scattered, and a palace revolt in Kochi hindered his recovery, so he headed to Fort Anjediva. New ships arrived from Portugal, which were intended for the nobleman Diogo Mendes de Vasconcelos at Malacca, who had been given a rival command of the region.

Three months later, on 25 November Afonso reappeared at Goa with a renovated fleet. Diogo Mendes de Vasconcelos was compelled to accompany him with the reinforcements for Malacca and about 300 Malabari reinforcements from Cannanore. In less than a day, they took Goa from Ismail Adil Shah and his Ottoman allies, who surrendered on 10 December. It is estimated that 6000 of the 9000 Muslim defenders of the city died, either in the fierce battle in the streets or by drowning while trying to escape. Afonso regained the support of the Hindu population, although he frustrated the initial expectations of Timoji, who aspired to become governor. Afonso rewarded him by appointing him chief "Aguazil" of the city, an administrator and representative of the Hindu and Muslim people, as a knowledgeable interpreter of the local customs. He then made an agreement to lower the yearly tribute.

Coining of money for d'Albuquerque at Goa (1510)

In Goa, Afonso established the first Portuguese mint in the East, after Timoja's merchants had complained of the scarcity of currency, taking it as an opportunity to solidify the territorial conquest. The new coin, based on the existing local coins, showed a cross on the obverse and an armillary sphere (or "esfera"), King Manuel's badge, on the reverse. Gold cruzados or manueis, silver esferas and alf-esferas, and bronze "leais" were issued.

Albuquerque founded at Goa the Hospital Real de Goa or Royal Hospital of Goa, by the Church of Santa Catarina. Upon hearing that the doctors were extorting the sickly with excessive fees, Albuquerque summoned them, declaring that "You charge a physician's pay and don't know what disease the men who serve our lord the King suffer from. Thus, I want to teach you what is it that they die from" and put them to work building the city walls all day till nightfall before releasing them.

Despite constant attacks, Goa became the center of Portuguese India, with the conquest triggering the compliance of neighbouring kingdoms: the Sultan of Gujarat and the Zamorin of Calicut sent embassies, offering alliances and local grants to fortify.

Afonso then used Goa to secure the spice trade in favor of Portugal and sell Persian horses to Vijayanagara and Hindu princes in return for their assistance.

=== Conquest of Malacca, 1511 ===
Map of the mare clausum claims made by Spanish Empire and Portuguese Empire, with Afonso's "Strait Controlling" strategy marked in blue circles.

Afonso explained to his armies why the Portuguese wanted to capture Malacca:

"The King of Portugal has often commanded me to go to the Straits, because...this was the best place to intercept the trade which the Moslems...carry on in these parts. So it was to do Our Lord's service that we were brought here; by taking Malacca, we would close the Straits so that never again would the Moslems be able to bring their spices by this route.... I am very sure that, if this Malacca trade is taken out of their hands, Cairo and Mecca will be completely lost." (The Commentaries of the Great Afonso de Albuquerque)

In February 1511, through a friendly Hindu merchant, Nina Chatu, Afonso received a letter from Rui de Araújo, one of the nineteen Portuguese held at Malacca since 1509. It urged moving forward with the largest possible fleet to demand their release, and gave details of the fortifications. Afonso showed it to Diogo Mendes de Vasconcelos, as an argument to advance as a joint fleet. In April 1511, after fortifying Goa, he gathered a force of about 900 Portuguese, 200 Hindu mercenaries and about eighteen ships. He then sailed to Malacca against orders and despite the protest of Diogo Mendes, who claimed command of the expedition. Afonso eventually centralized the Portuguese government in the Indian Ocean. After the Malaccan conquest, he wrote a letter to the king to explain his disagreement with Diogo Mendes, suggesting that further divisions could be harmful to the Portuguese in India. Under his command was Ferdinand Magellan, who had participated in the failed embassy of Diogo Lopes de Sequeira in 1509.

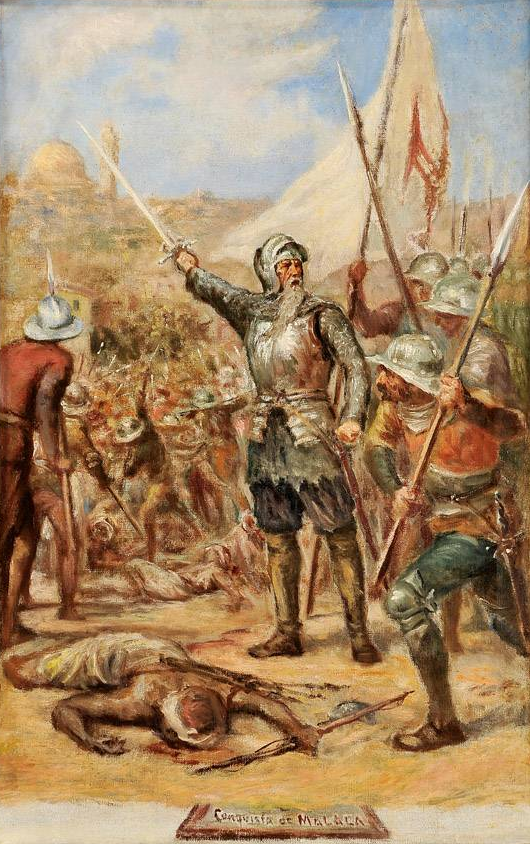
"Conquest of Malacca", study painting by Ernesto Condeixa

After a false start towards the Red Sea, they sailed to the Strait of Malacca. It was the richest city that the Portuguese tried to take, and a focal point in the trade network where Malay traders met Gujarati, Chinese, Japanese, Javanese, Bengali, Persian and Arabic, among others, described by Tomé Pires as of invaluable richness. Despite its wealth, it was mostly a wooden-built city, with few masonry buildings but was defended by a mercenary force estimated at 20,000 men and more than 2000 pieces of artillery. Its greatest weakness was the unpopularity of the government of Sultan Mahmud Shah, who favoured Muslims, arousing dissatisfaction amongst other merchants.

Afonso made a bold approach to the city, his ships decorated with banners, firing cannon volleys. He declared himself lord of all the navigation, demanded the Sultan release the prisoners and pay for damages, and demanded consent to build a fortified trading post. The Sultan eventually freed the prisoners, but was unimpressed by the small Portuguese contingent. Afonso then burned some ships at the port and four coastal buildings as a demonstration. The city being divided by the Malacca River, the connecting bridge was a strategic point, so at dawn on 25 July, the Portuguese landed and fought a tough battle, facing poisoned arrows, taking the bridge in the evening. After fruitlessly waiting for the Sultan's reaction, they returned to the ships and prepared a junk (offered by Chinese merchants), filling it with men, artillery and sandbags. Commanded by António de Abreu, it sailed upriver at high tide to the bridge. The day after, all had landed. After a fierce fight during which the Sultan appeared with an army of war elephants, the defenders were dispersed and the Sultan fled. Afonso waited for the reaction of the Sultan. Merchants approached, asking for Portuguese protection. They were given banners to mark their premises, a sign that they would not be looted. On 15 August, the Portuguese attacked again, but the Sultan had fled the city. Under strict orders, they looted the city, but respected the banners.

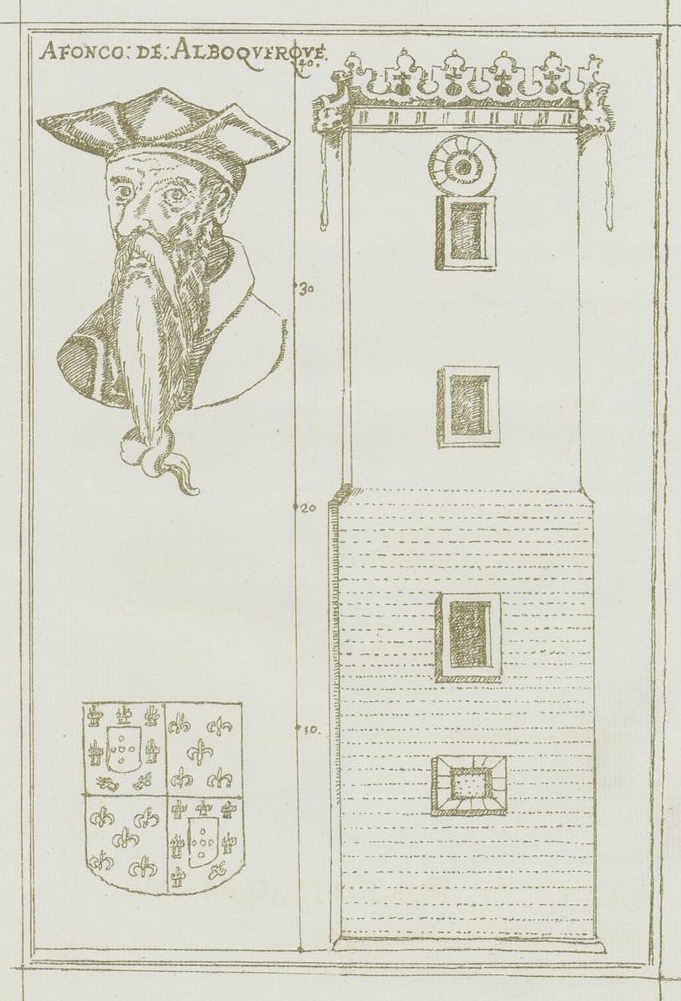
An illustration of the keep of the fortress of Malacca, which included a stone relief of Afonso de Albuquerque, by Manuel Godinho de Erédia (1613)

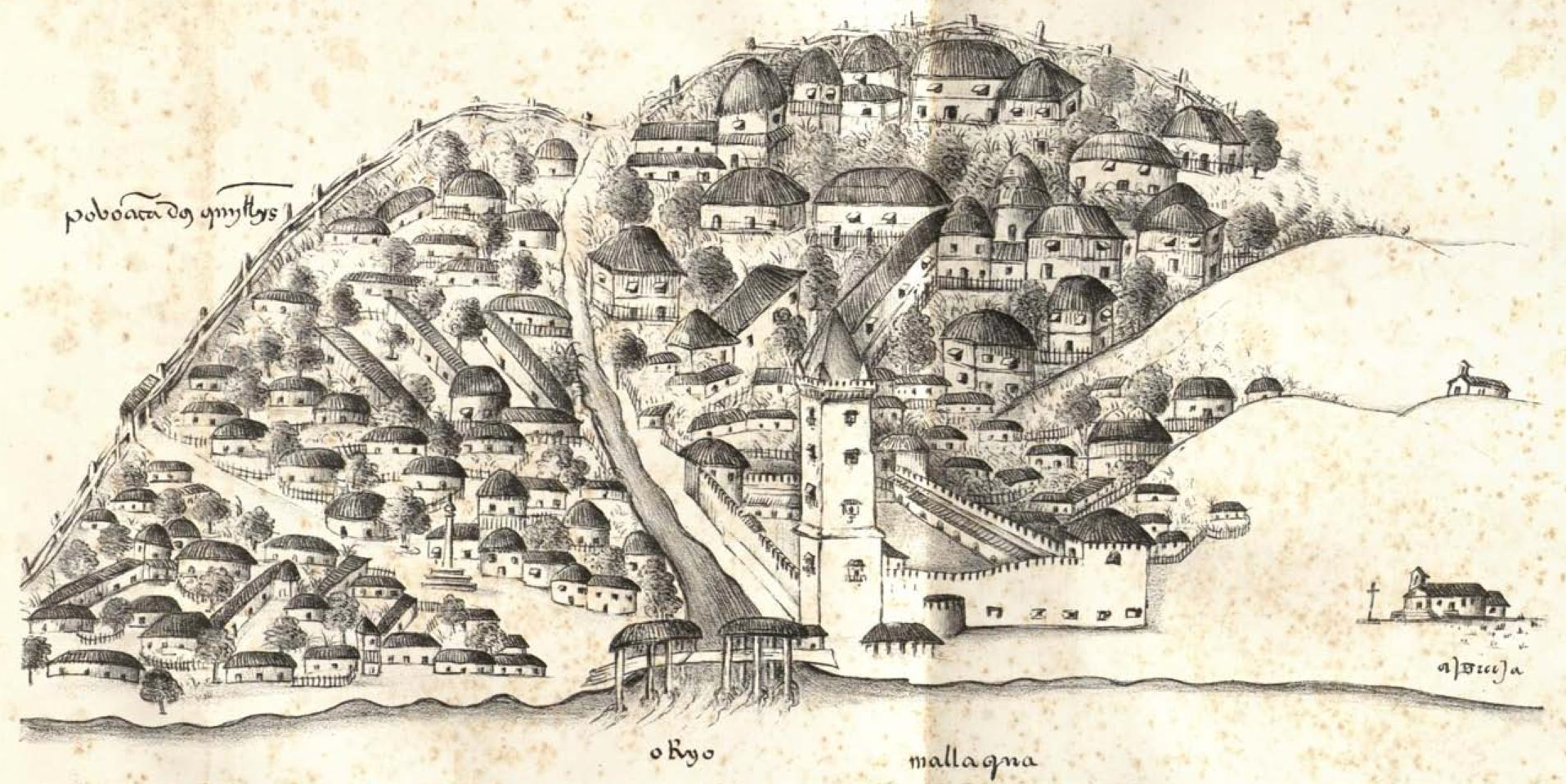
Malacca, with A Famosa, depicted by Albuquerque's scrivener, Gaspar Correia.

Afonso prepared Malacca's defenses against a Malay counterattack, building a fortress, assigning his men to shifts and using stones from the mosque and the cemetery. Despite the delays caused by heat and malaria, it was completed in November 1511, its surviving door now known as "A Famosa" ('the famous'). It was possibly then that Afonso had a large stone engraved with the names of the participants in the conquest. To quell disagreements over the order of the names, he had it set facing the wall, with the single inscription Lapidem quem reprobaverunt aedificantes (Latin for "The stone the builders rejected", from David's prophecy, Psalm 118:22–23) on the front.

He settled the Portuguese administration, reappointing Rui de Araújo as factor, a post assigned before his 1509 arrest, and appointing rich merchant Nina Chatu to replace the previous Bendahara. Besides assisting in the governance of the city and the first Portuguese coinage, he provided the junks for several diplomatic missions. Meanwhile, Afonso arrested and had executed the powerful Javanese merchant Utimuti Raja who, after being appointed to a position in the Portuguese administration as representative of the Javanese population, had maintained contacts with the exiled royal family.

==== Shipwreck on the Flor de la mar, 1511 ====
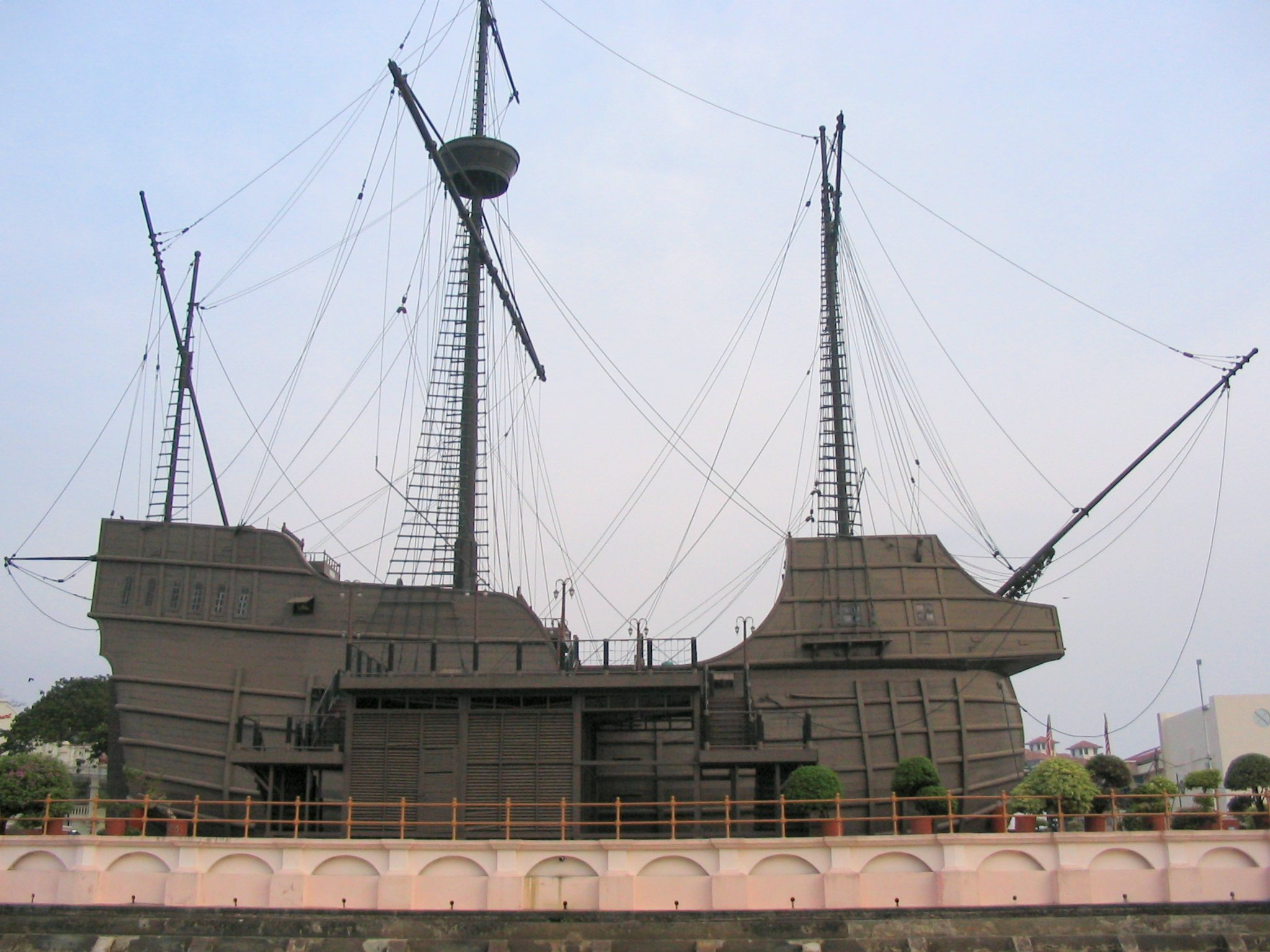
Replica of a Portuguese carrack at the Maritime Museum of Malacca, made in reference to the Flor do Mar

On 20 November 1511 Afonso sailed from Malacca to the coast of Malabar on the old Flor de la Mar carrack that had served to support the conquest of Malacca. Despite its unsound condition, he used it to transport the treasure amassed in the conquest, given its large capacity. He wanted to give the court of King Manuel a show of Malaccan treasures. There were also offerings from the Ayutthaya Kingdom (Thailand) to the king of Portugal, and all his own fortune. On the voyage, the Flor de la Mar was wrecked in a storm, and Afonso barely escaped drowning.

=== Missions from Malacca ===
==== Embassies to Pegu, Sumatra and Siam, 1511 ====
Most Muslim and Gujarati merchants having fled the city, Afonso invested in diplomatic efforts demonstrating generosity to Southeast Asian merchants, like the Chinese, to encourage good relations with the Portuguese. Trade and diplomatic missions were sent to continental kingdoms: Rui Nunes da Cunha was sent to Pegu (Burma), from where King Binyaram sent back a friendly emissary to Kochi in 1514 and Sumatra, Sumatran kings of Kampar and Indragiri sending emissaries to Afonso accepting the new power, as vassal states of Malacca. Knowing of Siamese ambitions over Malacca, Afonso sent Duarte Fernandes in a diplomatic mission to the Ayutthaya Kingdom (Thailand), returning in a Chinese junk. He was one of the Portuguese who had been arrested in Malacca, having gathered knowledge about the culture of the region. There he was the first European to arrive, establishing amicable relations between the kingdom of Portugal and the court of the king of Siam Ramathibodi II, returning with a Siamese envoy bearing gifts and letters to Afonso and the king of Portugal.

==== Expedition to the "spice islands" (Maluku islands), 1512 ====
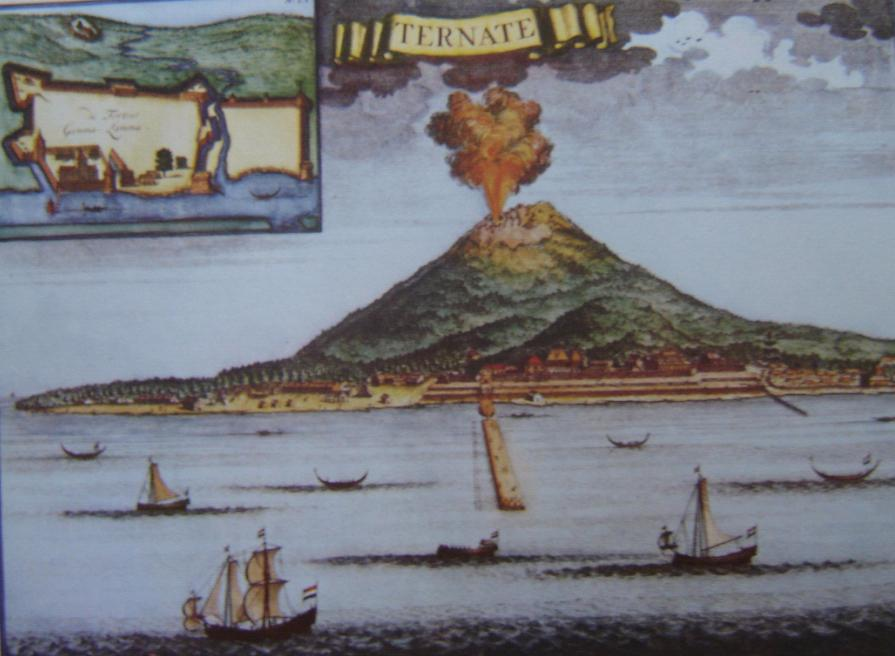
Depiction of Ternate with São João Baptista Fort, built in 1522

In November, after having secured Malacca and learning the location of the then secret "spice islands", Afonso sent three ships to find them, led by trusted António de Abreu with deputy commander Francisco Serrão. Malay sailors were recruited to guide them through Java, the Lesser Sunda Islands and the Ambon Island to Banda Islands, where they arrived in early 1512. There they remained for a month, buying and filling their ships with nutmeg and cloves. António de Abreu then sailed to Amboina whilst Serrão sailed towards the Moluccas, but he was shipwrecked near Seram. Sultan Abu Lais of Ternate heard of their stranding, and, seeing a chance to ally himself with a powerful foreign nation, brought them to Ternate in 1512 where they were permitted to build a fort on the island, the Forte de São João Baptista de Ternate, built in 1522.

=== Return to Cochin and Goa ===
Afonso returned from Malacca to Cochin, but could not sail to Goa as it faced a serious revolt headed by the forces of Ismael Adil Shah, the Sultan of Bijapur, commanded by Rasul Khan and his countrymen. During Afonso's absence from Malacca, the Portuguese who opposed the taking of Goa had waived its possession, even writing to the king that it would be best to let it go. Held up by the monsoon and with few forces available, Afonso had to wait for the arrival of reinforcement fleets headed by his nephew D. Garcia de Noronha, and Jorge de Mello Pereira.

While at Cochin, Albuquerque started a school. In a private letter to King Manuel I, he stated that he had found a chest full of books with which to teach the children of married Portuguese settlers (casados) and Christian converts, of which there were about a hundred, to read and write.

On 10 September 1512, Afonso sailed from Cochin to Goa with fourteen ships carrying 1,700 soldiers. Determined to recapture the fortress, he ordered trenches dug and a wall breached. But on the day of the planned final assault, Rasul Khan surrendered. Afonso demanded the fort be handed over with its artillery, ammunition and horses, and the deserters to be given up. Some had joined Rasul Khan when the Portuguese were forced to flee Goa in May 1510, others during the recent siege. Rasul Khan consented, on condition that their lives be spared. Afonso agreed and he left Goa. He did spare the lives of the deserters, but had them horribly mutilated. One such renegade was Fernão Lopes, bound for Portugal in custody, who escaped at the island of Saint Helena and led a 'Robinson Crusoe' life for many years. After such measures the town became the most prosperous Portuguese settlement in India.

== Administration and diplomacy, 1512–1515 ==
=== Ethiopian embassy, 1512 ===
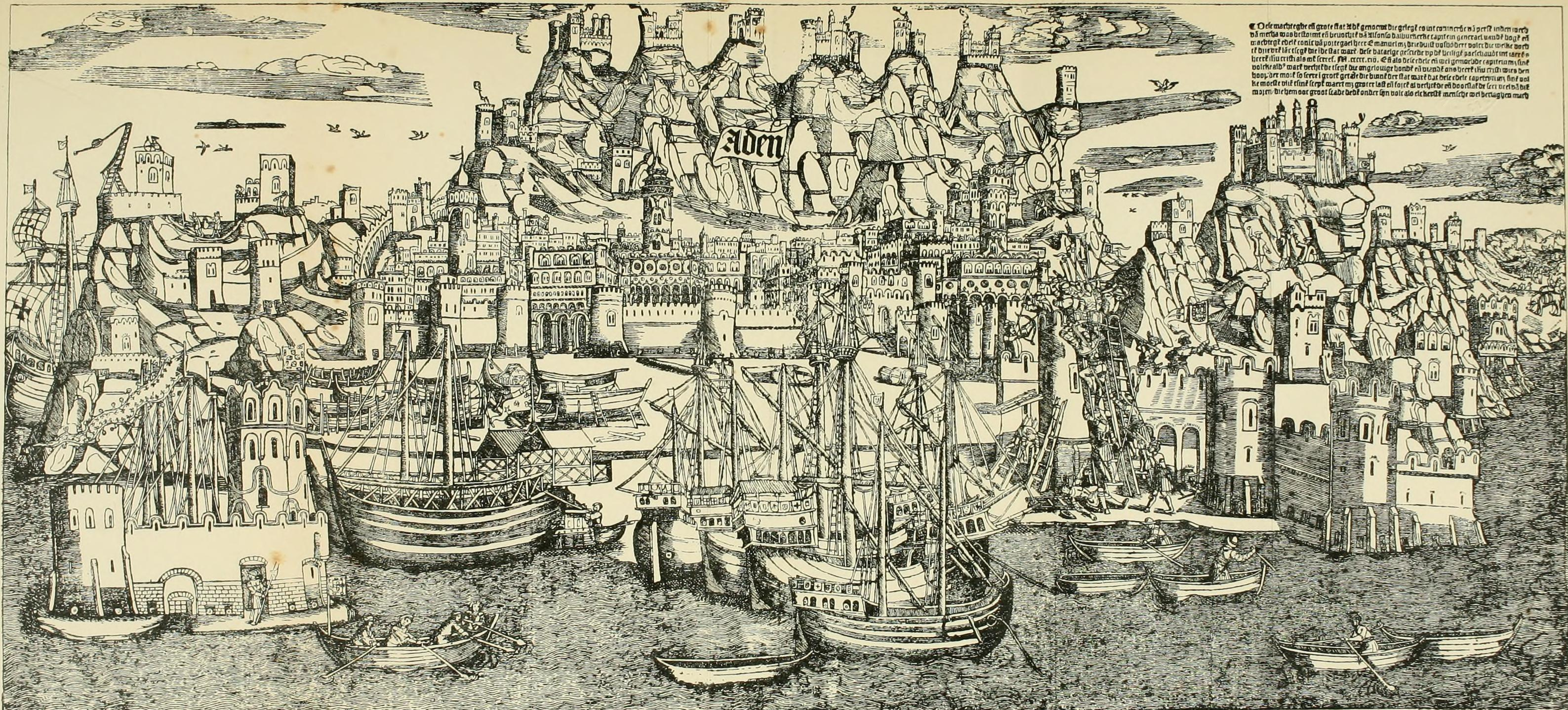
Attempted Portuguese scaling of the walls of Aden

In December 1512 an envoy from Ethiopia arrived at Goa. Mateus was sent by the regent queen Eleni, following the arrival of the Portuguese from Socotra in 1507, as an ambassador for the king of Portugal in search of a coalition to help face growing Muslim influence. He was received in Goa with great honour by Afonso, as a long-sought "Prester John" envoy. His arrival was announced by King Manuel to Pope Leo X in 1513. Although Mateus faced the distrust of Afonso's rivals, who tried to prove he was some impostor or Muslim spy, Afonso sent him to Portugal. The king is described as having wept with joy at their report.

In February 1513, while Mateus was in Portugal, Afonso sailed to the Red Sea with a force of about 1000 Portuguese and 400 Malabaris. He was under orders to secure that channel for Portugal. Socotra had proved ineffective to control the Red Sea entrance and was abandoned, and Afonso's hint that Massawa could be a good Portuguese base might have been influenced by Mateus' reports.

=== Campaign in the Red Sea, 1513 ===
Knowing that the Mamluks were preparing a second fleet at Suez, he wanted to advance before reinforcements arrived in Aden, and accordingly laid siege to the city. Aden was a fortified city, but although he had scaling ladders they broke during the chaotic attack. After half a day of fierce battle, Afonso was forced to retreat. He cruised the Red Sea inside the Bab al-Mandab, with the first European fleet to have sailed this route. He attempted to reach Jeddah, but the winds were unfavourable and so he sheltered at Kamaran island in May, until sickness among the men and lack of fresh water forced him to retreat. In August 1513, after a second attempt to reach Aden, he returned to India with no substantial results. In order to destroy the power of Egypt, he wrote to King Manuel of the idea of diverting the course of the Nile river to render the whole country barren. He also intended to steal the body of the Islamic prophet, Muhammad, and hold it for ransom until all Muslims had left the Holy Land.

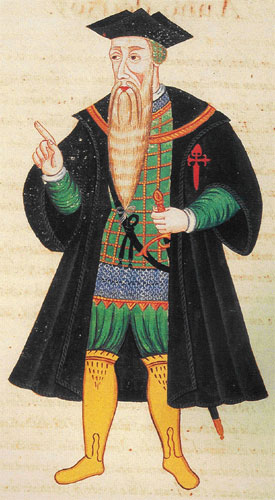
Portrait of Afonso de Albuquerque, governor of Portuguese Indies (1509–1515), from Pedro Barretto de Resende's Livro de Estado da India Oriental

Although Albuquerque's expedition failed to reach Suez, such an incursion into the Red Sea by a Christian fleet for the first time in history stunned the Muslim world, and panic spread in Cairo.

=== Submission of Calicut ===
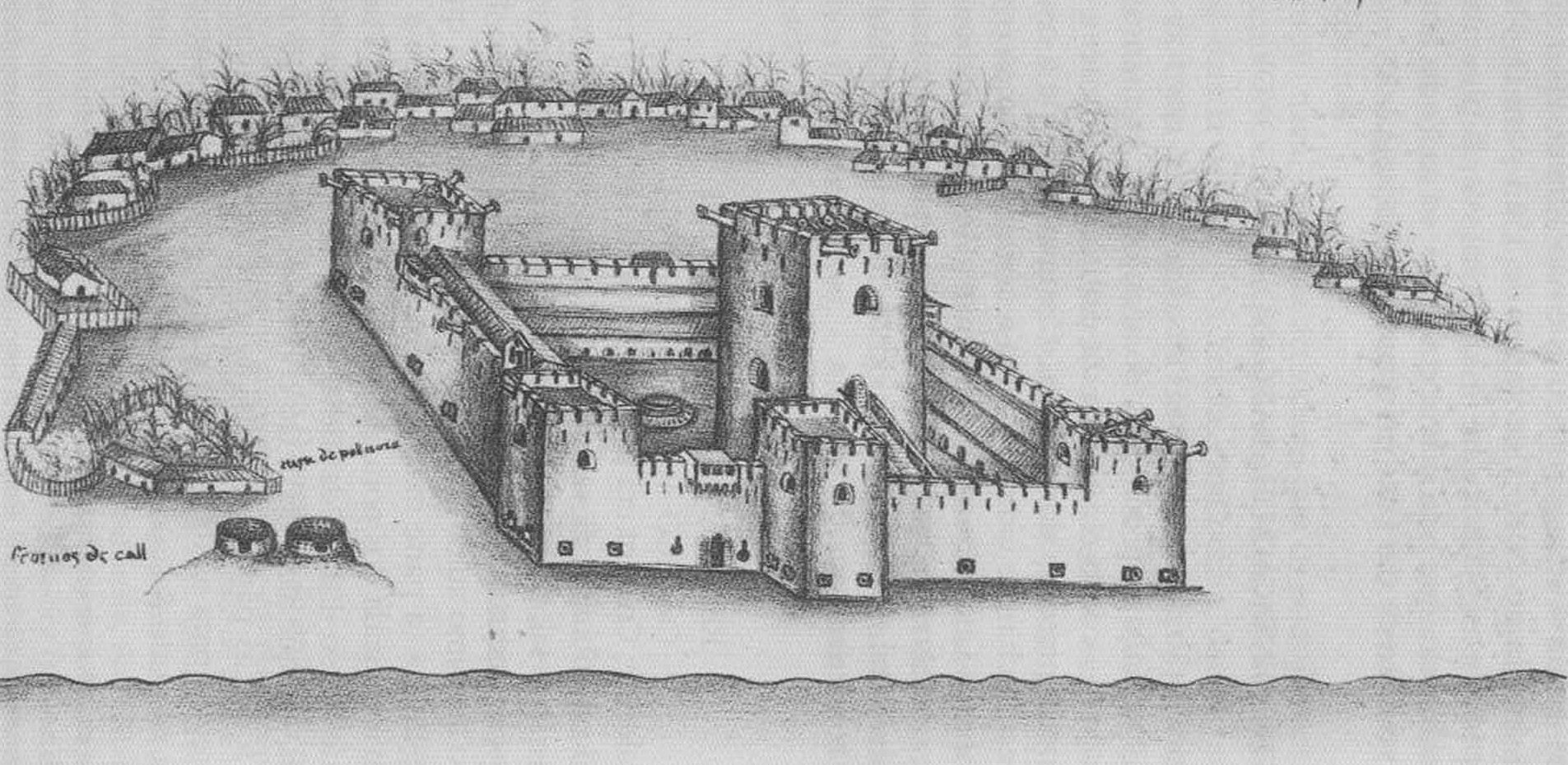
The Portuguese fort at Calicut

Albuquerque achieved during his term a favourable end to hostilities between the Portuguese and the Zamorin of Calicut, which had lasted since the massacre of the Portuguese in Calicut in 1502. As naval trade faltered and vassals defected, with no foreseeable solutions to the conflict with the Portuguese, the court of the Zamorin fell to in-fighting. The ruling Zamorin was assassinated and replaced by a rival, under the instigation of Albuquerque, permitting peace talks to commence. The Portuguese were allowed to build a fortress in Calicut itself, and acquired rights to obtain as much pepper and ginger as they wished, at stipulated prices, and half the customs duties of Calicut as yearly tribute. Construction of the fortress began immediately, under the supervision of chief architect Tomás Fernandes.

=== Goa, 1514 ===
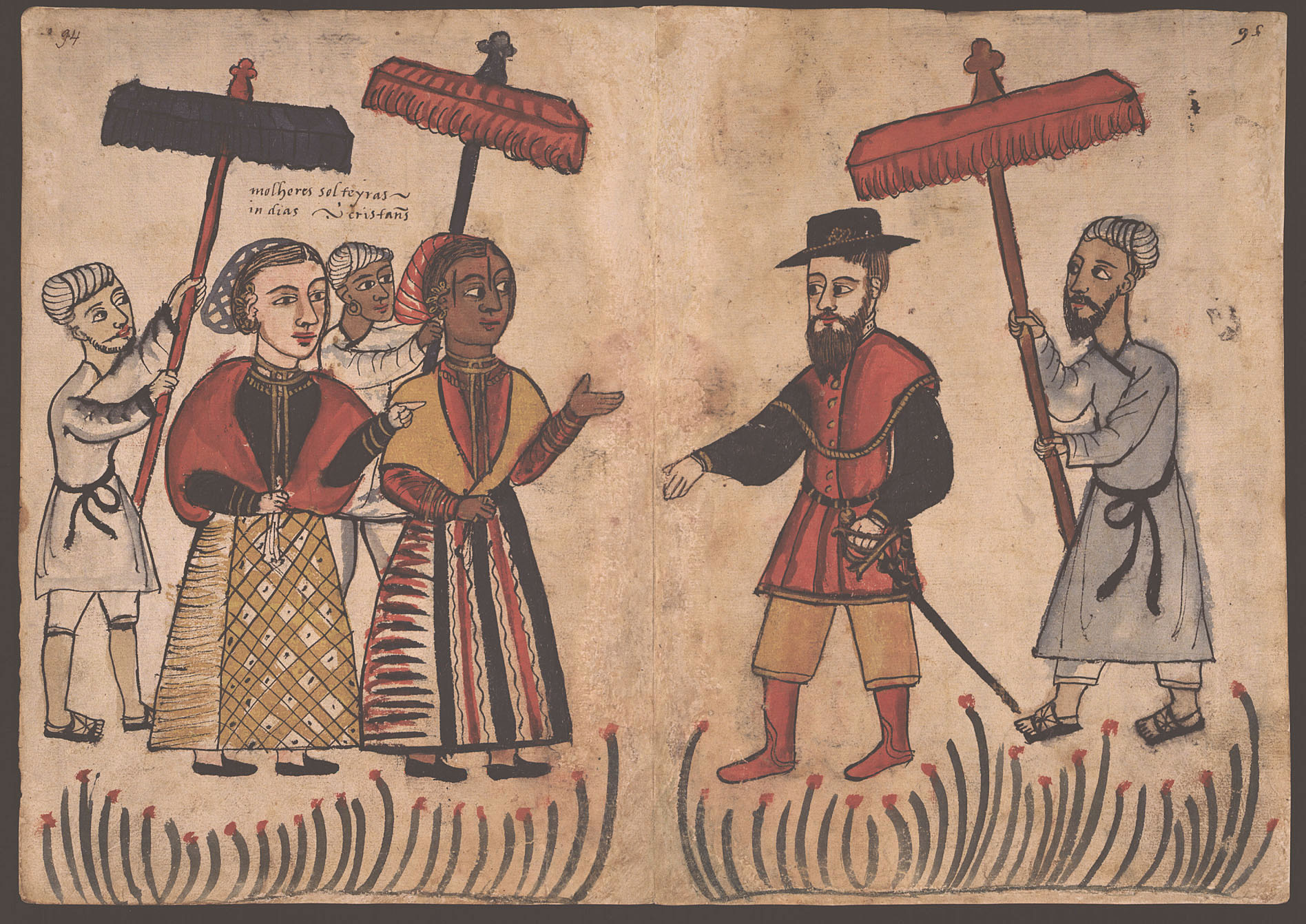
Christian maidens of Goa, meeting with a Portuguese nobleman seeking a wife (depicted in the Códice Casanatense, c. 1540)

With peace concluded, in 1514 Afonso devoted himself to governing Goa and receiving embassies from Indian governors, strengthening the city and encouraging marriages of Portuguese men and local women. At that time, Portuguese women were barred from traveling overseas in order to maintain discipline among the men on board the ships. In 1511 under a policy which Afonso promulgated, the Portuguese government encouraged their explorers to marry local women. To promote settlement, the King of Portugal granted freeman status and exemption from Crown taxes to Portuguese men (known as casados, or "married men") who ventured overseas and married local women. With Afonso's encouragement, mixed marriages flourished, giving birth to Portuguese-Indians or mestiços. He appointed local people for positions in the Portuguese administration and did not interfere with local traditions (except "sati", the practice of immolating widows, which he banned).

In March 1514 King Manuel sent to Pope Leo X an embassy led by Tristão da Cunha, who toured the streets of Rome in an extravagant procession of animals from the colonies and wealth from the Indies. His reputation reached its peak, laying foundations of the Portuguese Empire in the East.

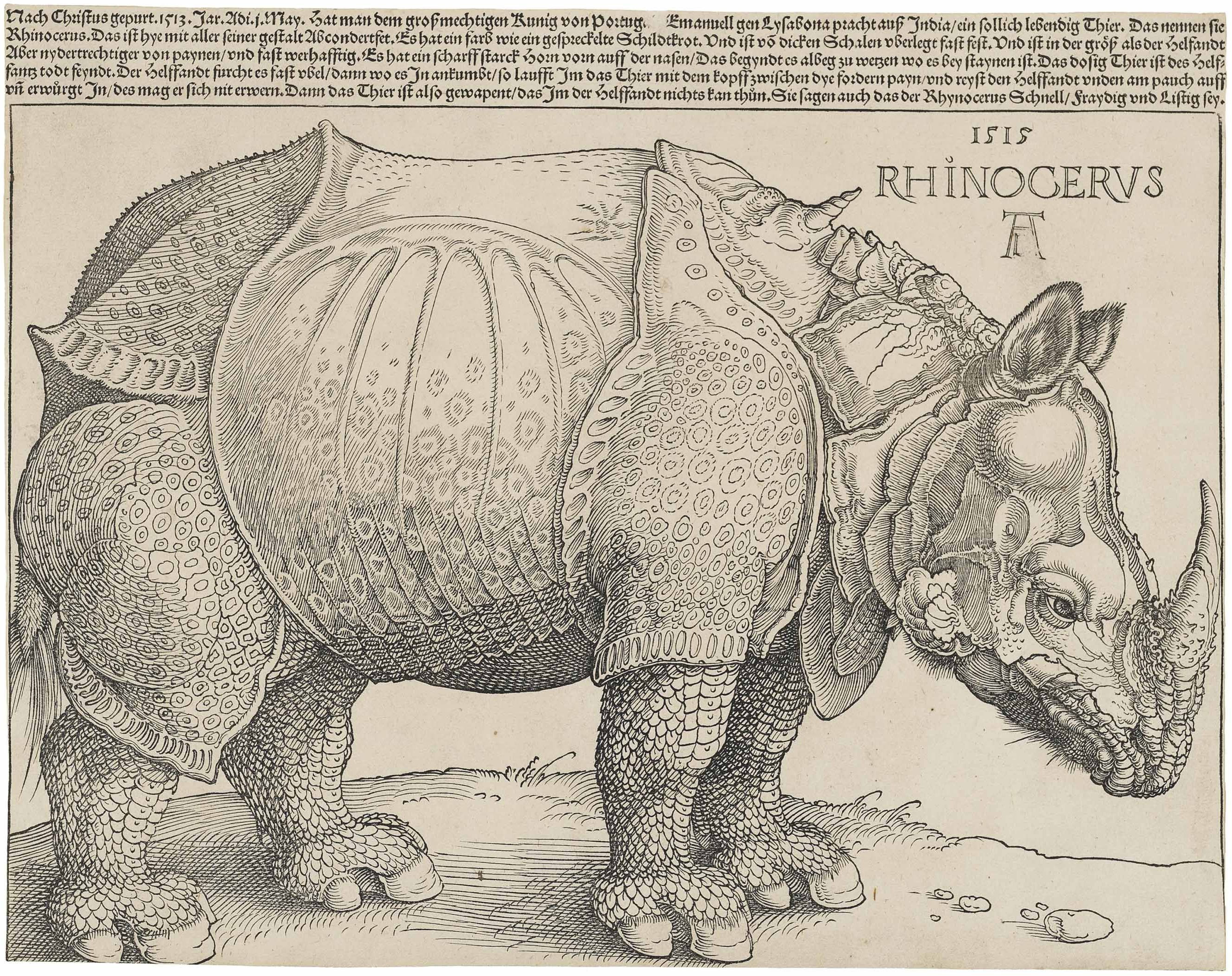
Dürer's Rhinoceros, woodcut (1515)

In early 1514, Afonso sent ambassadors to Gujarat's Sultan Muzaffar Shah II, ruler of Cambay, to seek permission to build a fort on Diu, India. The mission returned without an agreement, but diplomatic gifts were exchanged, including an Indian rhinoceros. Afonso sent the rhino to King Manuel, making it the first living example of a rhinoceros seen in Europe since the Roman Empire. King Manuel named the rhino Genda after the Gujarat word for ball, and later gifted it to Pope Leo X, but before completing its journey to Italy the boat carrying the rhino sank and the animal drowned. In 1515, German artist Albrecht Dürer created his famous woodcut known as Dürer's Rhinoceros, based on a description from a letter and a brief sketch made by an unknown artist who had seen the actual animal. Dürer's interpretation of the rhino cemented the idea of how a rhino should look like in people's mindsets up until the late-eighteenth century.

=== Conquest of Ormuz and Illness ===
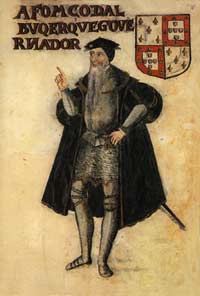
Portrait of Afonso de Albuquerque, from the Livro de Lisuarte de Abreu (c. 1565)

In 1513, at Cannanore, Afonso was visited by a Persian ambassador from Shah Ismail I, who had sent ambassadors to Gujarat, Ormuz and Bijapur. The shah's ambassador to Bijapur invited Afonso to send back an envoy to Persia. Miguel Ferreira was sent via Ormuz to Tabriz, where he had several interviews with the shah about common goals of defeating the Mamluk sultan.

At the same time, Albuquerque decided to conclude the effective conquest of Hormuz. He had learned that after the Portuguese retreat in 1507, a young king was reigning under the influence of a powerful Persian vizier, Reis Hamed, whom the king greatly feared. At Ormuz in March 1515, Afonso met the king and asked the vizier to be present. He then had him immediately stabbed and killed by his entourage, thus "freeing" the terrified king, so the island in the Persian Gulf yielded to him without resistance and remained a vassal state of the Portuguese Empire. Ormuz itself would not be Persian territory for another century, until an English-Persian alliance finally expelled the Portuguese in 1622. At Ormuz, Afonso met with Miguel Ferreira, returning with rich presents and an ambassador, carrying a letter from the Persian potentate Shah Ismael, inviting Afonso to become a leading lord in Persia. There he remained, engaging in diplomatic efforts, receiving envoys and overseeing the construction of the new fortress, while becoming increasingly ill. His illness was reported as early as September 1515. In November 1515, he embarked on a journey back to Goa.

==== Death ====
At this time, his political enemies at the Portuguese court were planning his downfall. They had lost no opportunity in stirring up the jealousy of King Manuel against him, insinuating that Afonso intended to usurp power in Portuguese India. While on his return voyage from Ormuz in the Persian Gulf, near the harbor of Chaul, he received news of a Portuguese fleet arriving from Europe, bearing dispatches announcing that he was to be replaced by his personal foe, Lopo Soares de Albergaria. Realizing the plot that his enemies had moved against him, profoundly disillusioned, he voiced his bitterness: "Grave must be my sins before the King, for I am in ill favor with the King for love of the men, and with the men for love of the King."

Feeling himself near death, he donned the surcoat of the Order of Santiago, of which he was a knight, and drew up his will, appointed the captain and senior officials of Ormuz, and organized a final council with his captains to decide the main matters affecting the Portuguese State of India. He wrote a brief letter to King Manuel, asking him to confer onto his natural son "all of the high honors and rewards" that Afonso had received, and assuring Manuel of his loyalty.

On 16 December 1515, Afonso de Albuquerque died within sight of Goa. As his death was known, in the city "great wailing arose", and many took to the streets to witness his body carried on a chair by his main captains, in a procession lit by torches amidst the crowd. Afonso's body was buried in Goa, according to his will, in the Church of Nossa Senhora da Serra (Our Lady of the Hill), which he had been built in 1513 to thank the Madonna for his escape from Kamaran island. (Note: This Church was later demolished between 1811 and 1842.) That night, the population of Goa, both Hindu and Portuguese, gathered to mourn his death.

In Portugal, King Manuel's zigzagging policies continued, still trapped by the constraints of real-time medieval communication between Lisbon and India and unaware that Afonso was dead. Hearing rumours that the Mamluk Sultan of Egypt was preparing a magnificent army at Suez to prevent the conquest of Ormuz, he repented of having replaced Afonso, and in March 1516 urgently wrote to Albergaria to return the command of all operations to Afonso and provide him with resources to face the Egyptian threat. He organized a new Portuguese navy in Asia, with orders that Afonso (if he was still in India), be made commander-in-chief against the Sultan of Cairo's armies. Manuel would afterwards learn that Afonso had died many months earlier, and that his reversed decision had been delivered many months too late.

After 51 years, in 1566, his body was moved to Nossa Senhora da Graça church in Lisbon, which was ruined and rebuilt after the 1755 Great Lisbon earthquake.

== Legacy ==
Albuquerque Monument on Afonso de Albuquerque Square in Lisbon (1902)

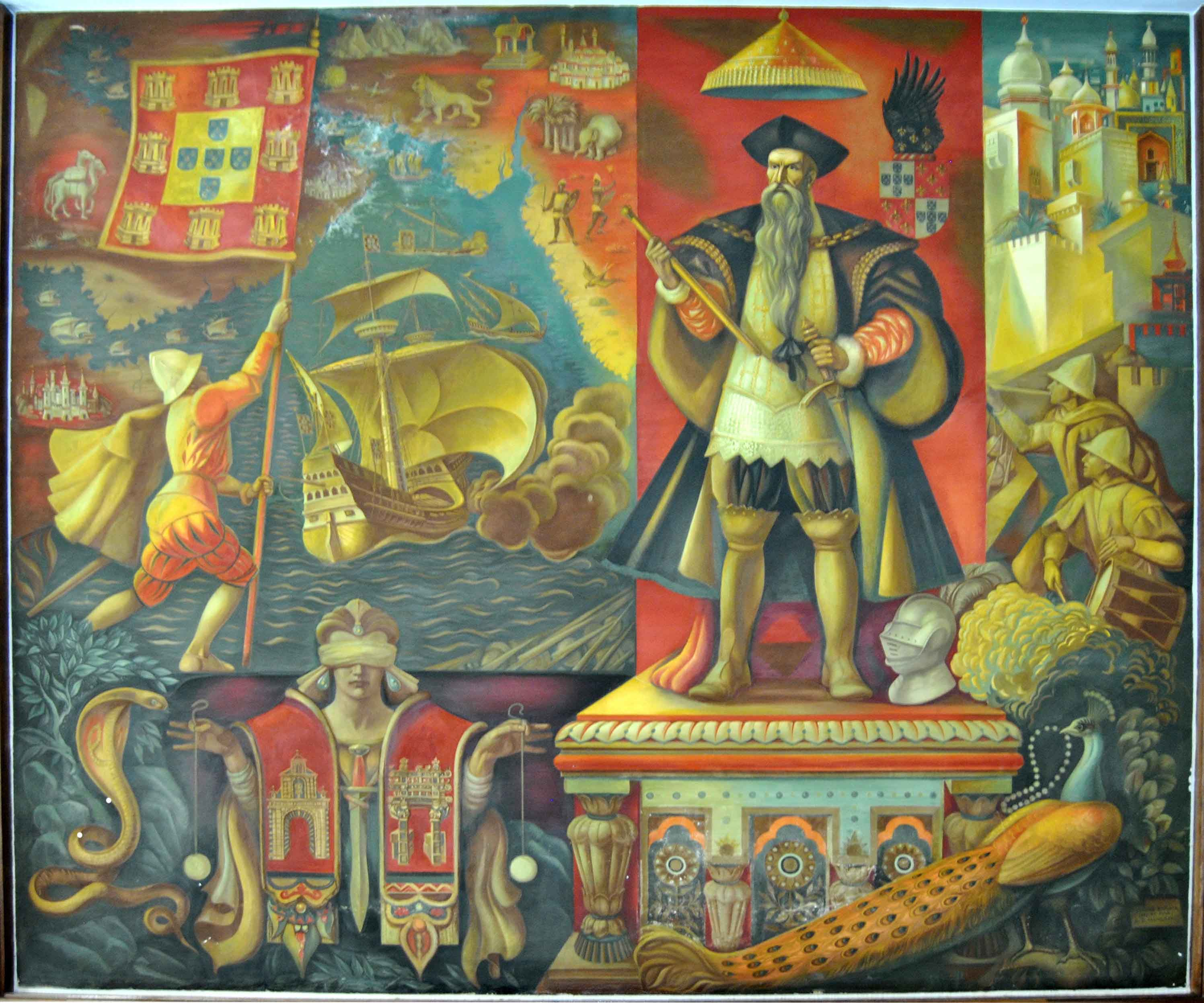
Allegorical fresco dedicated to Afonso de Albuquerque, present at the Palace of Justice of Vila Franca de Xira, in Portugal. Executed by Jaime Martins Barata

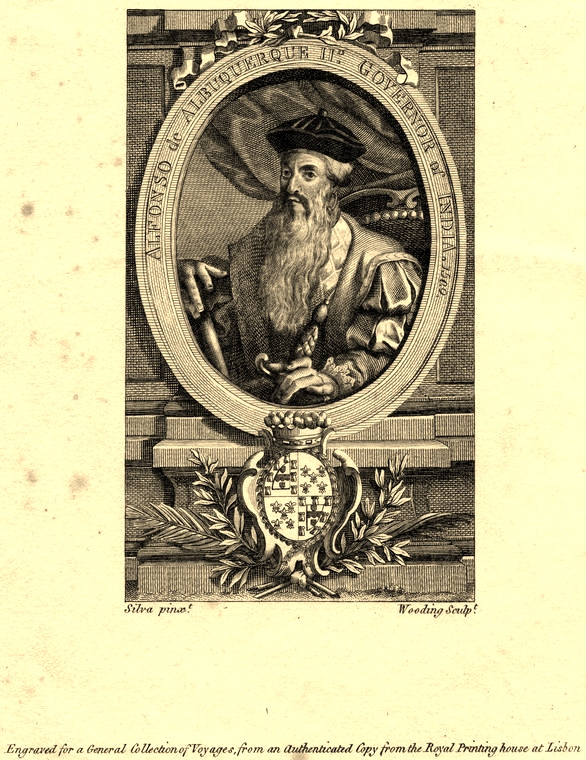
Afonso de Albuquerque as governor of India

King Manuel I of Portugal was belatedly convinced of Afonso's loyalty, and endeavoured to atone for his lack of confidence in Afonso by heaping honours upon his son, Brás de Albuquerque (1500–1580), whom he renamed "Afonso" in memory of the father. Afonso de Albuquerque was a prolific writer, having sent numerous letters during his governorship, covering topics from minor issues to major strategies. In 1557 his son published his biography under the title Commentarios do Grande Affonso d'Alboquerque.

In 1572, Afonso's actions were described in The Lusiads, the Portuguese main epic poem by Luís Vaz de Camões (Canto X, strophes 40–49). The poet praises his achievements, but has the muses frown upon the harsh rule of his men, of whom Camões was almost a contemporary fellow. In 1934, Afonso was celebrated by Fernando Pessoa in Mensagem, a symbolist epic. In the first part of this work, called "Brasão" (Coat-of-Arms), he relates Portuguese historical protagonists to each of the fields in the Portuguese coat-of-arms, Afonso being one of the wings of the griffin headed by Henry the Navigator, the other wing being King John II.

A variety of mango, which was created by Portuguese Jesuits in Goa via grafting techniques, was named in his honour.

Numerous homages have been paid to Afonso. He is featured in the Padrão dos Descobrimentos monument. There is a square named after him in Lisbon, which also features a bronze statue, as well as a prominent statue of his enrobed figure in a garden square in Bairro Gomes da Costa in Porto.

Two Portuguese Navy ships have been named in his honour: the sloop NRP Afonso de Albuquerque (1884) and the warship NRP Afonso de Albuquerque (1934).

== Notes ==
Preceded by Francisco de Almeida	Governor of Portuguese India; 1509–1515	Succeeded by Lopo Soares de Albergaria
