= Flor de la Mar =

Portuguese flagship until 1511

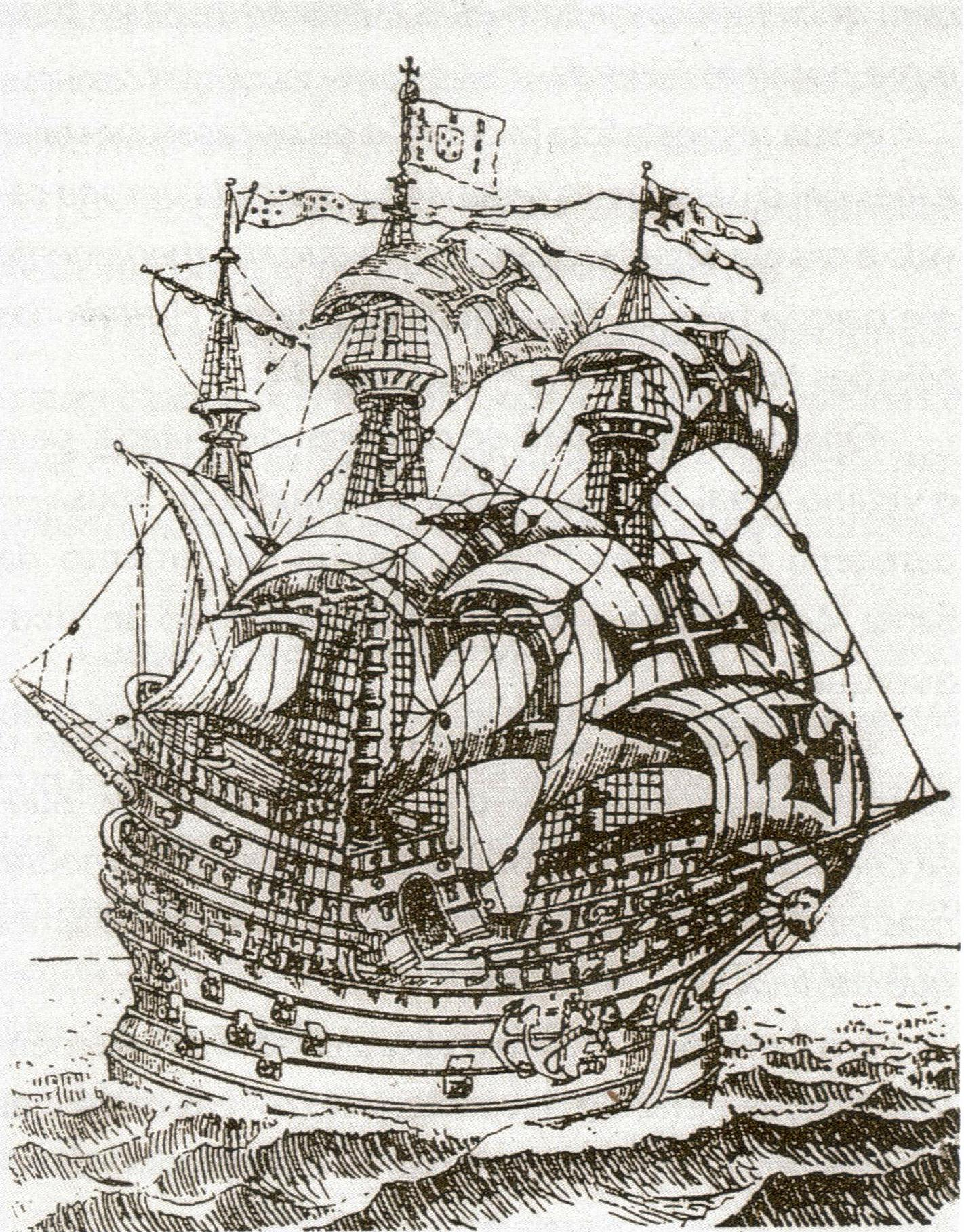
- Flor do Mar depicted as a galleon in the 16th century "Roteiro de Malaca".

History

Portugal
- Name: Flor de la Mar
- Builder: Lisbon shipyards, Kingdom of Portugal
- In service: 1502
- Out of service: 1511
- Fate: Lost in storm, 20 November 1511

General characteristics
- Class & type: Carrack
- Displacement: Unknown
- Tons burthen: 400 tons
- Length: 36 m (118.1 ft) (Malaysian replica)
- Beam: 8 m (26.2 ft) (Malaysian replica)
- Sail plan: Full-rigged
- Complement: 500 person (Note: The capacity represented here is taken from Hikayat Hang Tuah, which is not contemporary and written around (and after) the 17th century. It's possible that in overload conditions Flor de la Mar could carry so many people, but the usual capacity would be lesser than this. Hikayat Hang Tuah is noted to exaggerate; the number of Portuguese invading Malacca would be about 20,000 men while in reality, it is about 1,000.)
- Armament: 50 guns (total) (Note: Also referring to Hikayat Hang Tuah. The artillery it carries must be less because Portuguese ships are usually lightly armed for their size, and naval tactics of using broadside full of heavy cannons have yet to develop. Portuguese tactics of the 16th Century prioritized boarding and attack in close range, with the firing of artillery.)

Flor do Mar (modern Portuguese) or Flor de la Mar ('Flower of the Sea', spelled Frol de la Mar in Portuguese chronicles of the 16th century) was a Portuguese nau (carrack) of 400 tons, which over nine years participated in decisive events in the Indian Ocean until her sinking in November 1511. Nobleman Afonso de Albuquerque was returning from the conquest of Malacca, bringing with him a large treasure trove for the Portuguese king, when the ship was lost off the coast of Sumatra. Her wreck remains undiscovered. A replica of Flor do Mar is housed in the Maritime Museum in Malacca, Malaysia.

== History ==
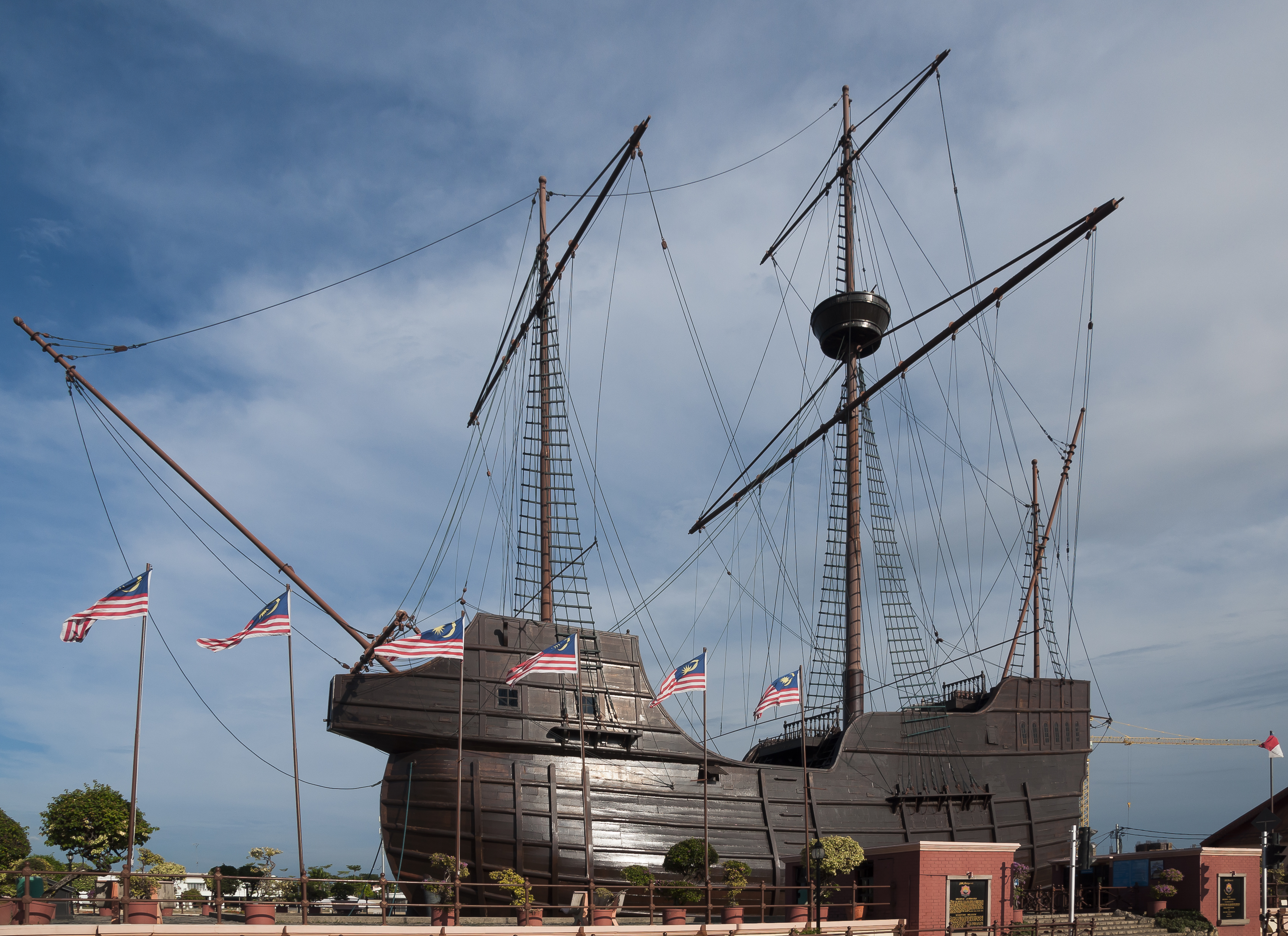
A replica of the Flor de la Mar" in Malacca City, Malaysia (2009)

=== Career ===
Flor do Mar was built in Lisbon in 1502, being one of the finest vessels of the time. She was built for the Portuguese India run. At 400 tons, she was the largest carrack yet built, nearly twice the size of the largest ships that had gone on previous runs.

She took her maiden trip from Portugal to India in 1502, under the command of Estevão da Gama, a cousin of Vasco da Gama. However, her return trip in 1503 met some complications—once loaded with spices, her large size and weight made her hard to manoeuver, particularly in the fast currents of the Mozambique Channel (notably, around Cape Correntes). Eyewitness Thomé Lopes reports her springing leaks and being forced to stop for repairs on Mozambique Island for nearly two months. She finally arrived in Portugal in late 1503.

Flor do Mar went out again on another India run in March 1505 under the command of João da Nova, as part of the 7th Portuguese India fleet of 22 ships, carrying D. Francisco de Almeida as the first viceroy of Portuguese India. On the return trip in 1506, she once again ran into difficulties in the Mozambique Channel. Springing leaks, she was forced to dock once again in Mozambique island for lengthy repairs. This time, she would stay stuck in the channel for some ten months. Nova attempted to take her out repeatedly, but the heavy-laden ship kept running into problems, forcing him to return to the island, repair and try again.

The ship and her frustrated captain were still stuck in Mozambique when they were found in February 1507—almost exactly one year after Flor do Mar left India—by the outgoing 8th India armada under the command of Tristão da Cunha. Cunha ordered his crews to help repair the ship back to seaworthy shape, unload the ship's spice cargo onto another Portugal-bound transport (under the command of António de Saldanha) and then annexed the empty Flor do Mar and her captain into his own India-bound armada. She was never to return to Portugal.

Flor do Mar and her captain João da Nova participated in Cunha's conquest of Socotra. In the aftermath, to Nova's surprise, Cunha ordered her to remain in the western Arabian Sea, integrated into the patrol squadron of Afonso de Albuquerque. Nova and the ship participated in the Albuquerque-led conquest of the cities of Curiati (Kuryat), Muscat in July 1507, Khor Fakkan, (accepting also the submission of the cities of Kalhat and Sohar) and Ormuz in the same year. Two years later in India, she was commandeered to serve as the flagship of D. Francisco de Almeida in the 1509 battle of Diu. João da Nova died that same year in Cochin, and Almeida (ending his term as vice-roy) planned to bring Flor do Mar back to Portugal himself, taking special care to repair her into shape. But his successor, Afonso de Albuquerque, forbade it and retained the ship in India, giving Almeida another ship to take home instead.

Under Afonso de Albuquerque's orders, Flor do Mar supported the conquest of Goa in 1510 as well as the conquest of Malacca in 1511. It has never been found since.

=== Capacity ===
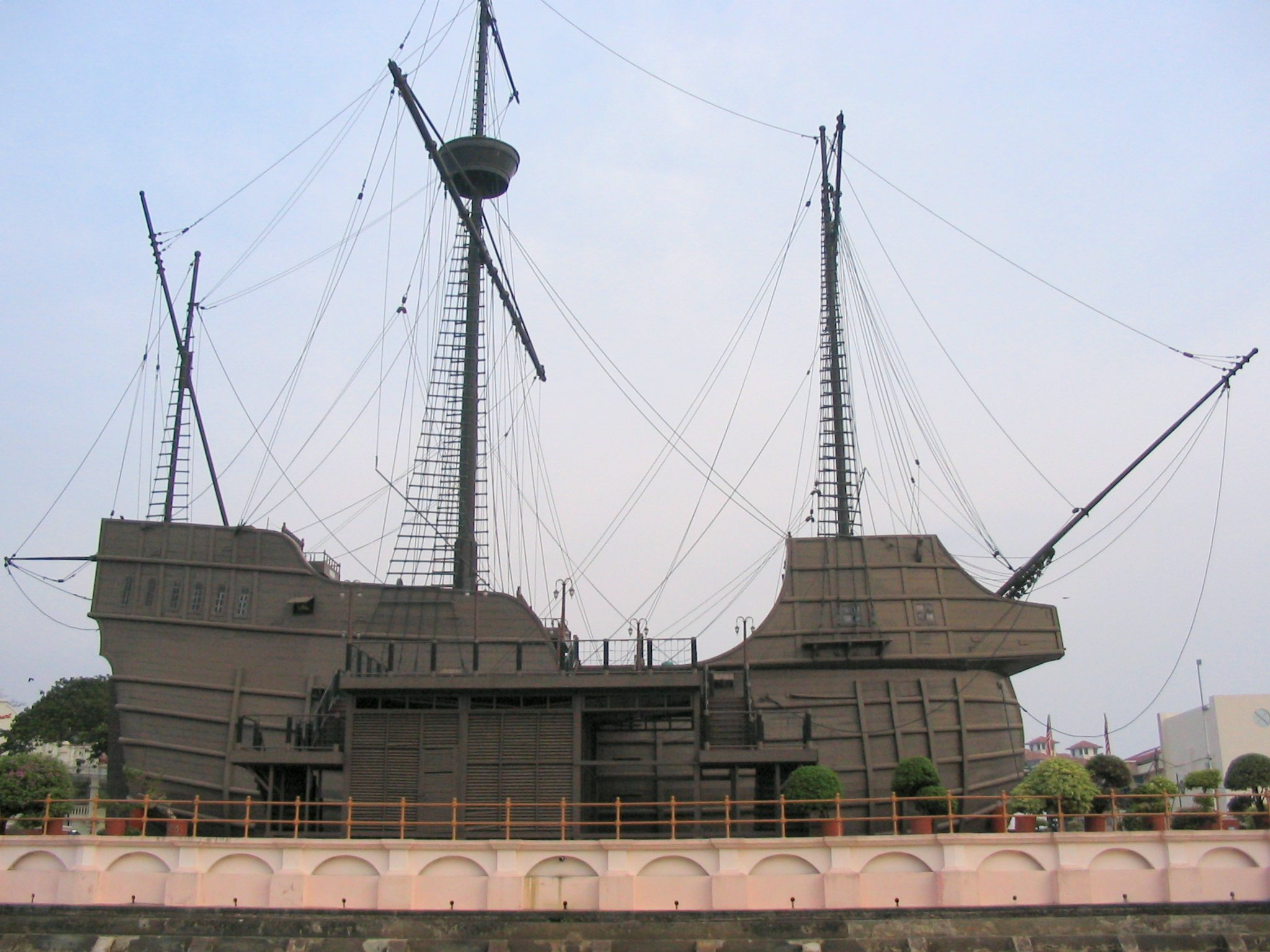
Another replica of Flor do Mar, Maritime Museum of Malacca (2006)

Flor do Mar's longevity was remarkable. At a time when India ships were built for only three or four years of useful service, Flor do Mar was one of the longest-lasting ships of the India run. However, her service as a cargo ship left a lot to be desired. Dangerously unseaworthy when fully loaded, she only completed one full India run, and not without difficulties. Nonetheless, much was learned from the ship's experience. Although several larger ships—600t, 900t, 1500t—would be occasionally built, the average India nau would hover around 400–450t. As such, Flor do Mar can be considered the prototype of what would become the typical 16th-century India nau. The ship's experience also led to the institutionalisation of the "outer route", i.e. captains of heavy-laden large ships were ordered to avoid returning via the fast Mozambique Channel, but rather sail a longer but calmer course east of Madagascar.

=== Shipwreck ===
Flor de la Mar served to support the conquest of Malacca, then the largest commercial center of the East Indies. Given her large capacity, Afonso de Albuquerque decided to use the ship to transport the vast treasure looted from the Sultan of Malacca's palace back to Portugal.

When Flor de la Mar came out of Malacca in late 1511 and sailed along the north-east Sumatran state of Pasé, in the Strait of Malacca, she was caught in a storm and wrecked on some shoals, causing numerous casualties. The ship did not survive the storm and sank during the night of 20 November 1511, off Timia Point in the Kingdom of Aru, Sumatra.

Afonso de Albuquerque was saved in the most difficult conditions, using an improvised raft, but the cargo was irretrievably lost. Also lost were more than 400 men on board. Flor de la Mar still lies undiscovered in the seabed.

Attempts to locate and salvage the shipwreck have been the cause of controversy. Portugal, Indonesia, and Malaysia all claim salvage rights. A replica of Flor do Mar is housed in Maritime Museum of Malacca.

=== In popular culture ===
The lost treasure of the Flor de la Mar plays a significant role in the 2022 BBC Doctor Who episode Legend of the Sea Devils.

The wreck and treasure was briefly alluded to in the early and closing segments of the 2016 video game Uncharted 4: A Thief's End, where the characters of Jameson and Elena are attempting to convince series protagonist Nathan Drake to salvage the wreck without the required permits.

== See also ==
- Santa Anna (1522 ship)
- São João Baptista (galleon)
- Peter von Danzig (ship)
- Mendam Berahi
- O Bravo (jong)

== Bibliography ==
- Dieter Dellinger, Texto publicado na REVISTA DE MARINHA em Abril de 1989
- Sérgio Luís de Carvalho, A flor de la mar: 1510 - 1515 com Albuquerque na Índia, Texto Ed., 1993, ISBN 972-47-0422-X
- Diffie, Bailey W. and George D. Winius (1977). Foundations of the Portuguese Empire, 1415–1580. Minneapolis: University of Minnesota Press. ISBN 0-8166-0782-6.
- Albuquerque, Braz de (1774). Commentarios do grande Afonso Dalboquerque. Lisbon: Na Regia Officina Typografica. Available in English as The Commentaries of the Great Afonso Dalboquerque, Second Viceroy of India. Laurier Books Ltd. /AES 2000. ISBN 978-81-206-1514-4
