= Maritime Museum (Malaysia) =

Museum in Melaka Tengah, Malacca, Malaysia

- Muzium Samudera
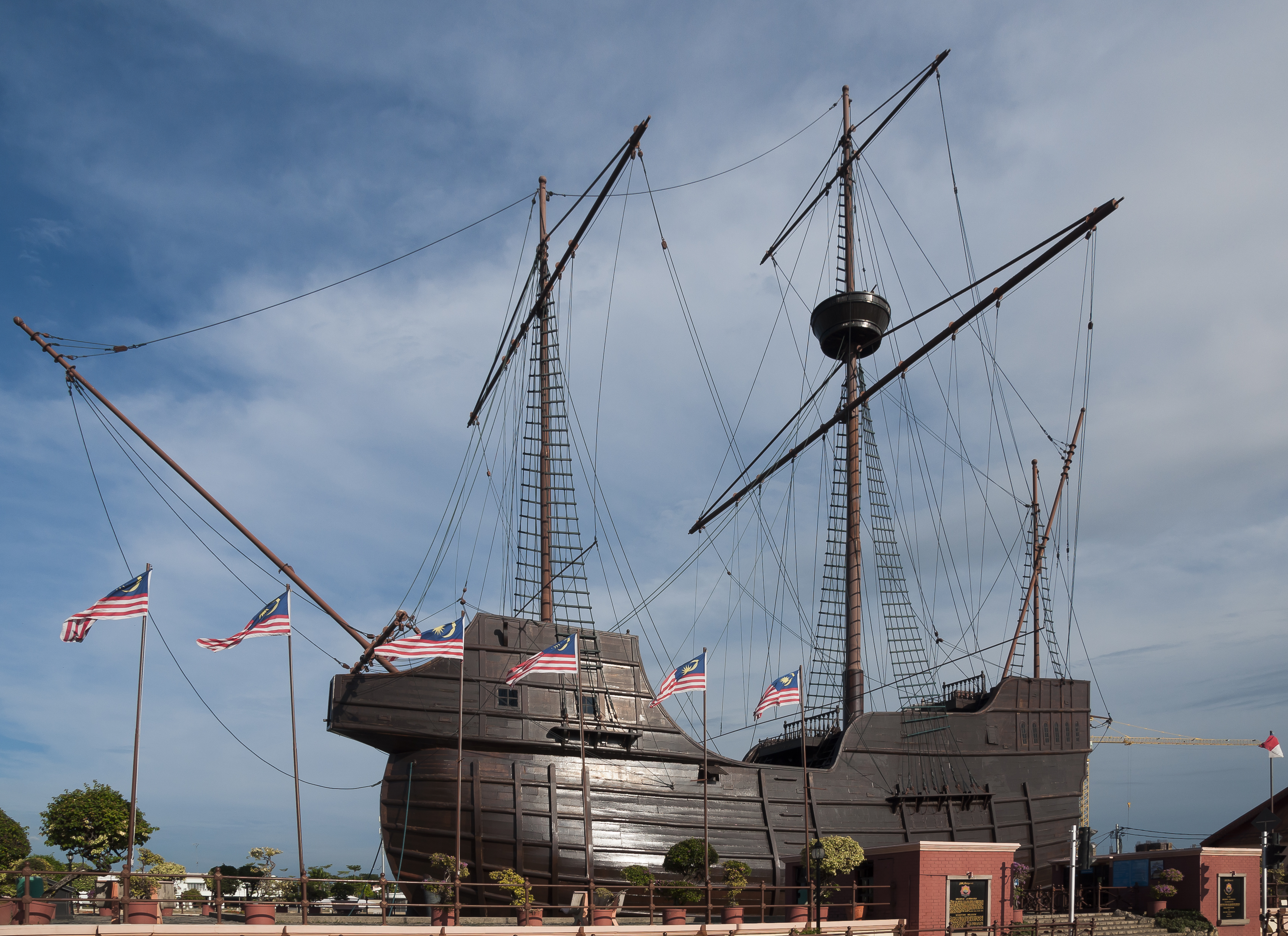
- Established: 13 June 1994; 32 years ago
- Location: Malacca City, Malacca, Malaysia
- Coordinates: 2°11′30.5″N 102°14′47.2″E
- Type: museum

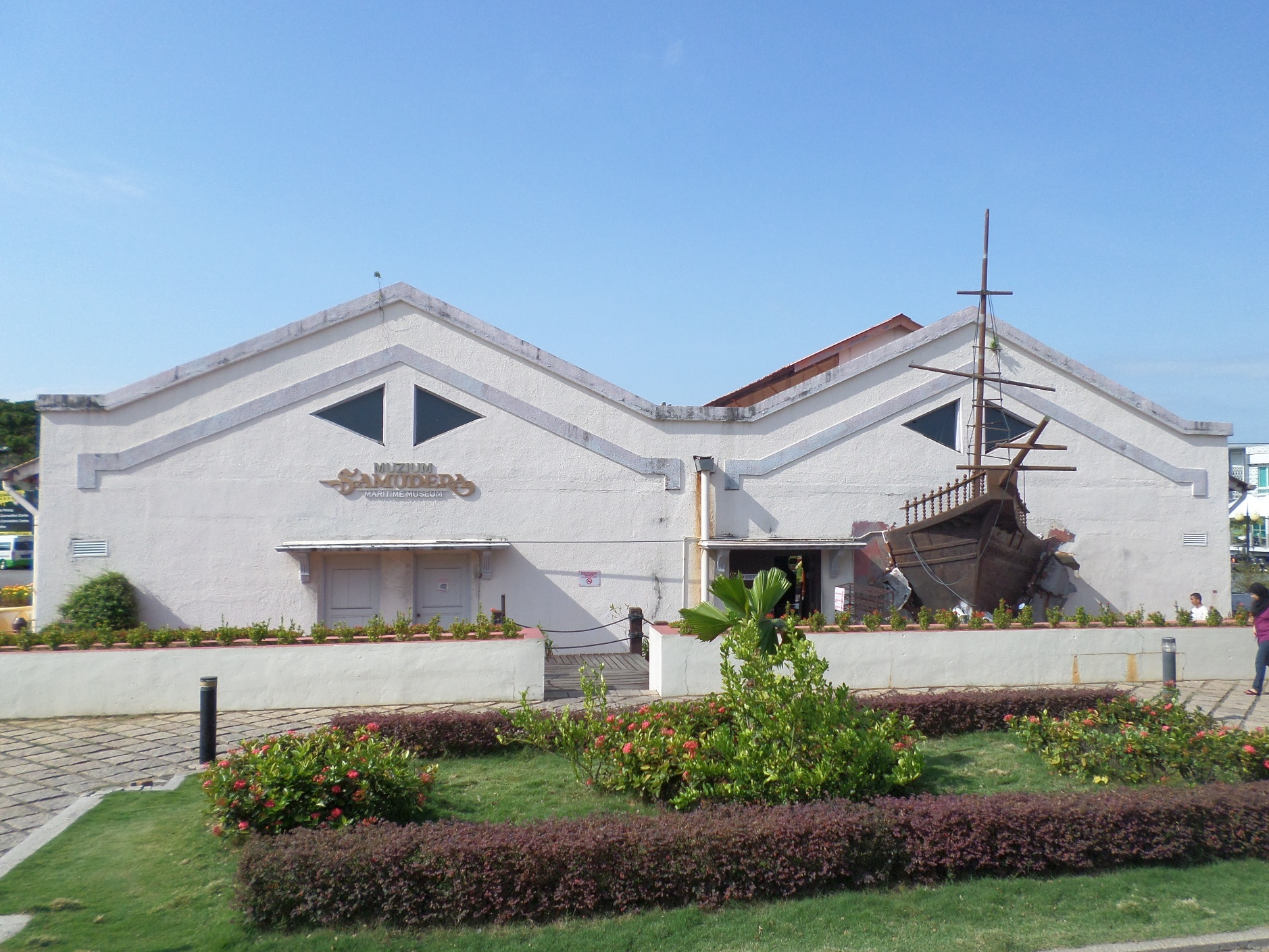
Maritime Museum phase two

Maritime Museum (Malay: Muzium Samudera) is a museum about maritime activities in Malacca City, Malacca, Malaysia. It was officially opened to the public by Prime Minister Mahathir Mohamad on 13 June 1994, began with phase one. The phase two of the museum is housed in the old Guthrie building and was opened by State Committee for Tourism, Culture and Environment Chairman Poh Ah Tiam on 23 May 1998.

The museum main exhibits the replica of Flor do Mar with 34 metres high, 36 metres long and 8 metres wide; houses exhibits, artifacts and documents from the golden era of Malacca and shows how political control of Malacca was essential to the establishment of maritime dominance in the region and also displays the trading link of Malacca from the early time through the colonial era until independence.

== See also ==
- List of museums in Malaysia
- List of tourist attractions in Malacca
- Flor de la Mar
