= Capture of Muscat (1507) =

Portuguese conquest of Muscat in 1507

- Part of Portuguese conquest of Oman
Date	1507
Location	Muscat, Oman 23.608611°N 58.591944°E
Result	Portuguese victory
Territorial changes	Establishment of Portuguese Muscat

Belligerents
Kingdom of Portugal	Kingdom of Hormuz

Commanders and leaders
Afonso de Albuquerque	Unknown

Strength
460–500 soldiers 6 ships	Unknown

Casualties and losses
Unknown	Very heavy
- Location within Oman

The Capture of Muscat happened in 1507, when a Portuguese armada commanded by Afonso de Albuquerque attacked and conquered the city of Muscat, which was under Hormuzi rule.

== Background ==
In 1506, Albuquerque left Lisbon and together with Tristão da Cunha, commanded the 8th Portuguese India Armada. They reached the Indian Ocean in 1507 and started conquering cities all over the East African coast. Then, they proceeded to the island of Socotra, which was also conquered. With this, Albuquerque separated from the rest of the armada with around 500 men and 6 ships and headed towards the Arabian peninsula.

The Portuguese finally reached the coast of Oman in the summer of 1507, passing by the Masirah Island, conquering Qalhat and Quriyat using brutal force, not even women and children were sparred from the massacres. Albuquerque's forces reached Muscat soon after. After arriving there, the Portuguese commander classified Muscat as the "principal entrepôt of the Kingdom of Hormuz" and "a very large and populous city....". Although he would greatly compliment the city, this had done little to save it from the terrifying violence that was yet to come.

== The conquest ==
The Portuguese soldiers began the assault before daybreak with two different groups launching opposite sides of the city. The Muslim defenders fought bravely but to no avail, the Portuguese drove them out of town and remained in pursuit, killing most of them. Local Muslim ships had virtually no chance in defeating the Portuguese heavy weaponry. The citizens of Muscat promised Afonso de Albuquerque ten thousand xerafins of gold if he did not sack the town. However, after failing to produce the sum, the Portuguese set the entire city ablaze. Men, women and children were slaughtered. Stories of this brutality remain in the memories of those who faced the wrath of Albuquerque's power.

After staying in the city for eight days, the Portuguese left and went to conquer the city of Sohar. Hormuz would be the next target but this time the Portuguese commander would not be so successful, as he was forced to abandon the attack after a mutiny in his army.

== Aftermath ==
The Portuguese ruled Muscat and other Omani coastal cities for almost 150 years.
