= Jaime Martins Barata =

Portuguese visual artist (1899–1970)

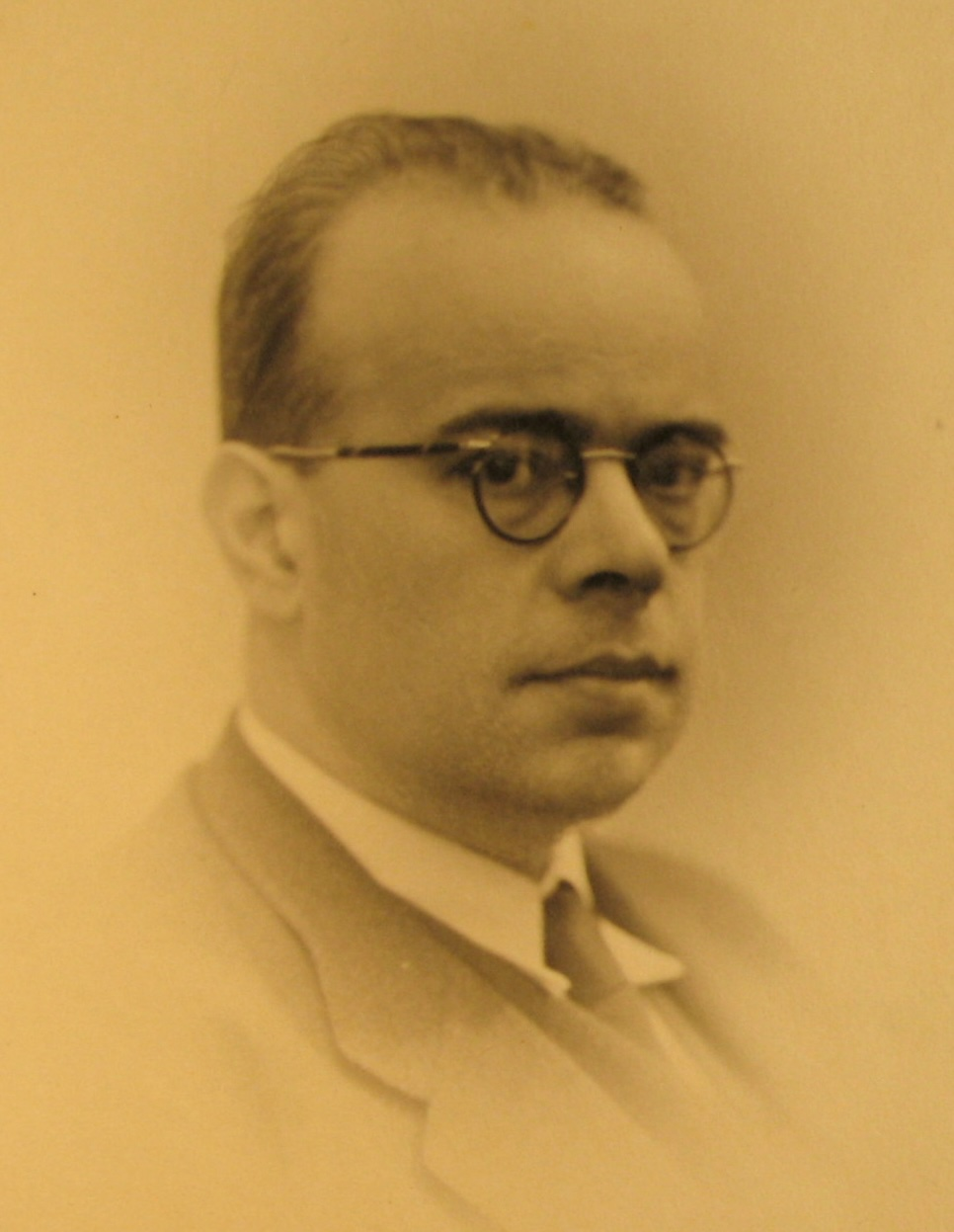
- Portrait of Martins Barata (1945), photograph by Manuel Alves de San Payo
- Born: Jaime Martins Barata; 7 March 1899; Santo António das Areias, Marvão, Portugal
- Died: 15 May 1970 (aged 71); Campolide, Lisbon, Portugal
- Education: Escola Normal Superior (University of Lisbon)
- Known for: Historical illustration; easel painting; large-scale murals and fresco; design of stamps and coins
- Notable work: Triptychs for the Escadaria Nobre of the Assembly of the Republic; fresco Batalha dos Atoleiros; stamps Caravela and Cavalinho; 5$00 and 2$50 coin designs
- Spouse: Maria Emília Roque Gameiro

Jaime Martins Barata (7 March 1899 – 15 May 1970) was a Portuguese visual artist. His work includes illustration—especially historical illustration—easel painting, large-scale painting (murals and fresco), and the design of postage stamps and coins, among other works.

== Early life ==
Martins Barata was born at Herdade do Pereiro, in Santo António das Areias (Marvão). Soon after his birth, his family moved to Nossa Senhora da Graça de Póvoa e Meadas, in Castelo de Vide, a place he always considered his home and where he was baptised. His father, José Pedro Barata (from Nisa, Alpalhão), died in 1904. His mother, Antónia de Jesus Martins (from Mação, Cardigos), a primary-school teacher, moved the family to Lisbon in 1910 so he could continue his education. There he attended Liceu da Lapa (renamed Lyceu Central de Pedro Nunes in 1911).

== Career overview ==
Martins Barata worked across several areas: easel painting, secondary-school teaching (1921–1947), illustration (from the 1920s and throughout his life), large-scale painting (from his participation in the 1940 Exposição do Mundo Português), and the design of stamps, banknotes and coins—most notably as Artistic Consultant to the Portuguese postal service (CTT) (1947–1969).

== Secondary-school teaching ==
After completing secondary school, Martins Barata entered the Escola Normal Superior with the intention of becoming a mathematics teacher. He was also admitted to the Instituto Superior de Comércio (later ISCEF), with the idea of studying economics, but ultimately pursued a career as a high-school arts teacher (primarily drawing). He taught at several secondary schools, including Pedro Nunes (Lisbon), Mouzinho da Silveira (Portalegre), Bocage (Setúbal), Gil Vicente (Lisbon) and Passos Manuel (Lisbon).

While teaching, he wrote a dissertation on handicraft in Portuguese secondary schools, and co-authored two textbooks: Elementos de História da Arte (with José Leitão de Barros) and Elementos de Desenho (with Luís Passos). In 1947, after being appointed Artistic Consultant to CTT, he left secondary-school teaching permanently.

== Easel painting ==
As a secondary-school student, Martins Barata already showed a particular aptitude for painting, with watercolour as his preferred medium. He gained early recognition at the annual exhibitions of the Sociedade Nacional de Belas-Artes, where he received medals in watercolour and printmaking.

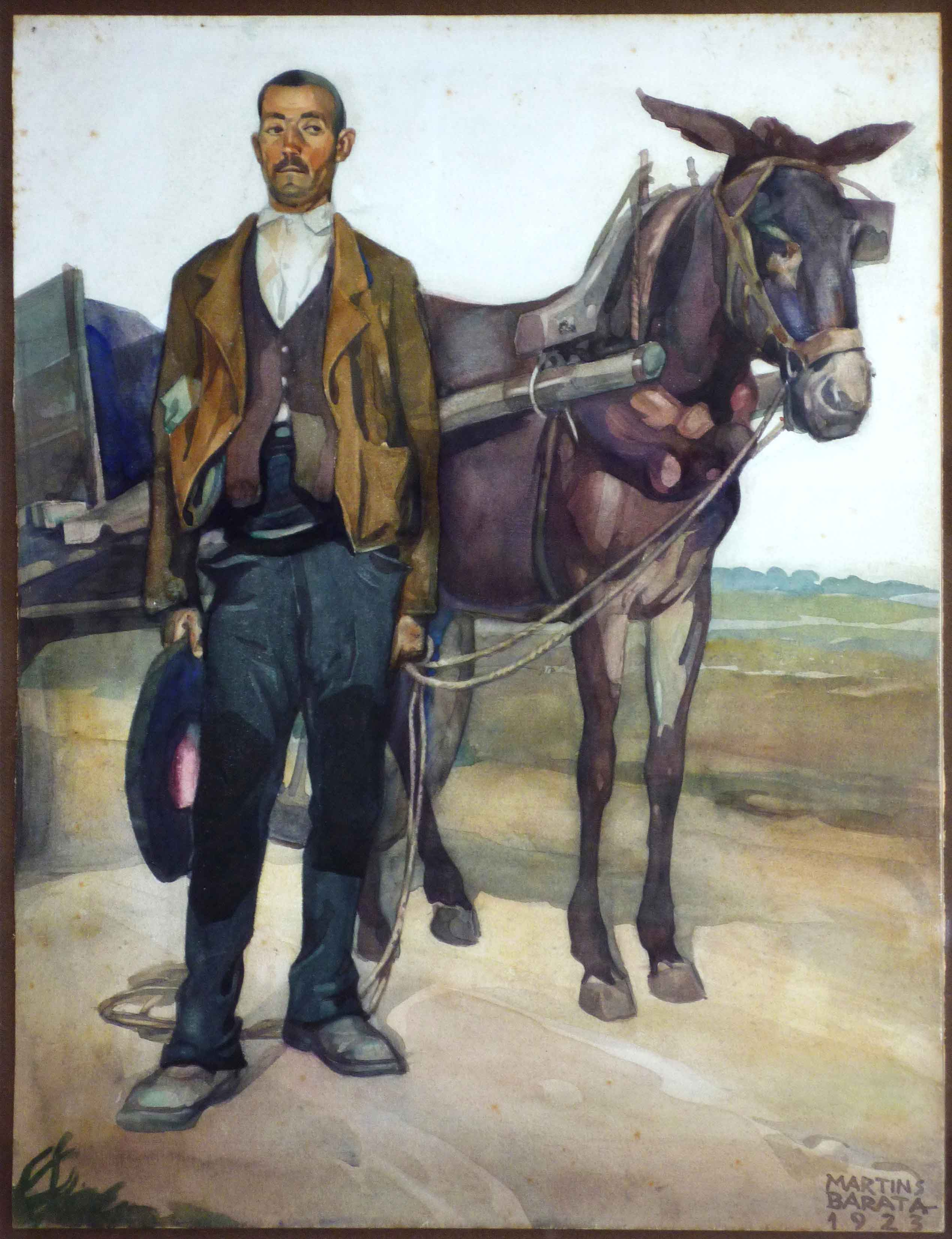
Homem e Burro (Man and Donkey), 1923, watercolour on paper

== Illustration ==
In collaboration with José Leitão de Barros and others, Martins Barata worked in journalism and publishing in the 1920s, including early photojournalism, printing (as a co-founder of Ocogravura, a rotogravure workshop), and illustration for periodicals such as ABC, ABCzinho, Domingo Ilustrado, Notícias Ilustrado, Música, and Inventário de Lisboa.

His illustration work frequently evoked historical themes and the city of Lisbon. A notable example is the set of images prepared for Lisboa, Oito Séculos de História (1947), a work that also included graphic contributions by Almada Negreiros.

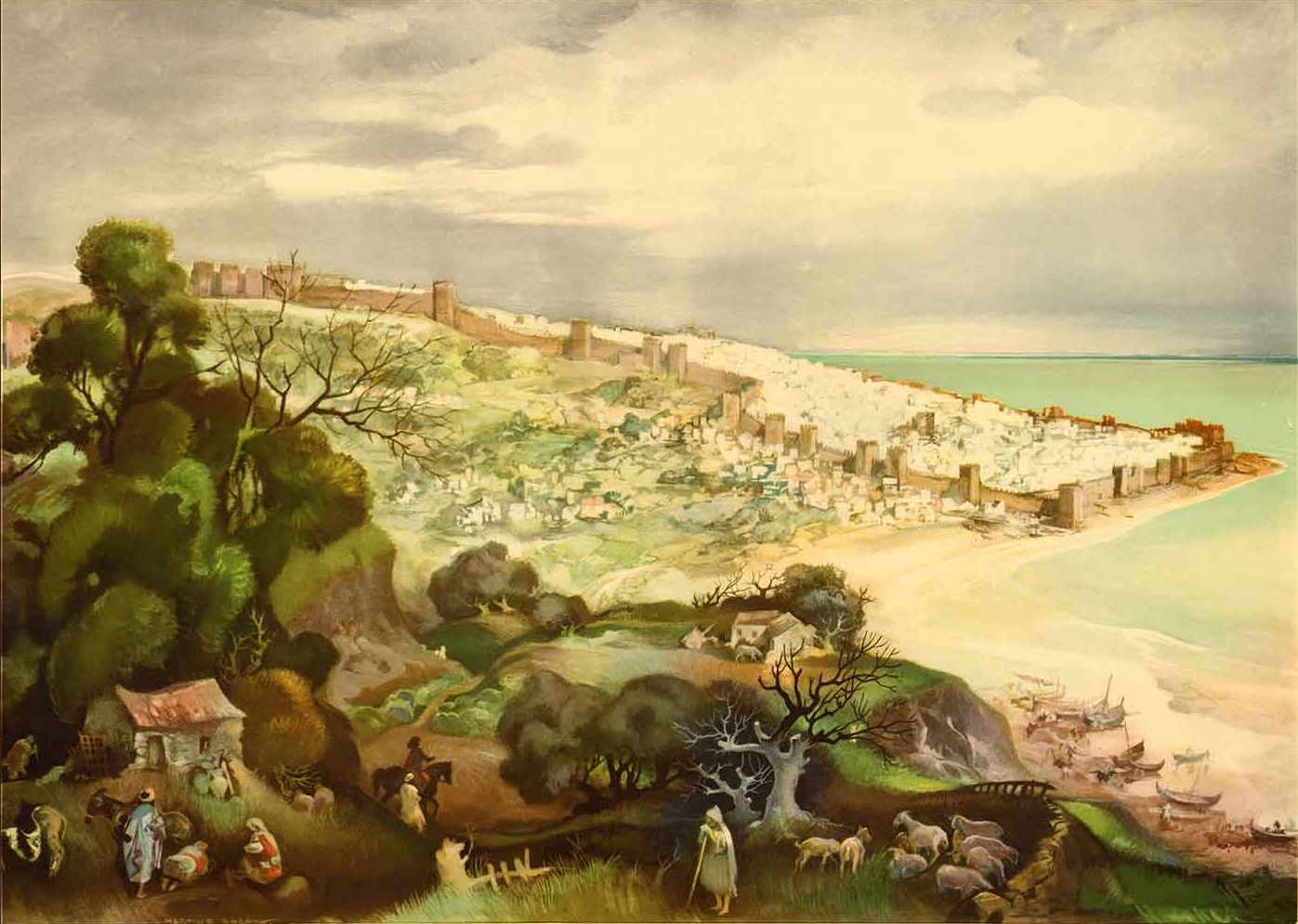
Lisboa Mourisca (Moorish Lisbon), 1947, tempera on canvas

== Large-scale works ==
The 1940 Exposição do Mundo Português (Portuguese World Exhibition) marked a turning point in Martins Barata’s career, leading to major commissions in monumental painting. He was later invited to decorate the Escadaria Nobre of the Palácio de São Bento, completing the work in 1944.

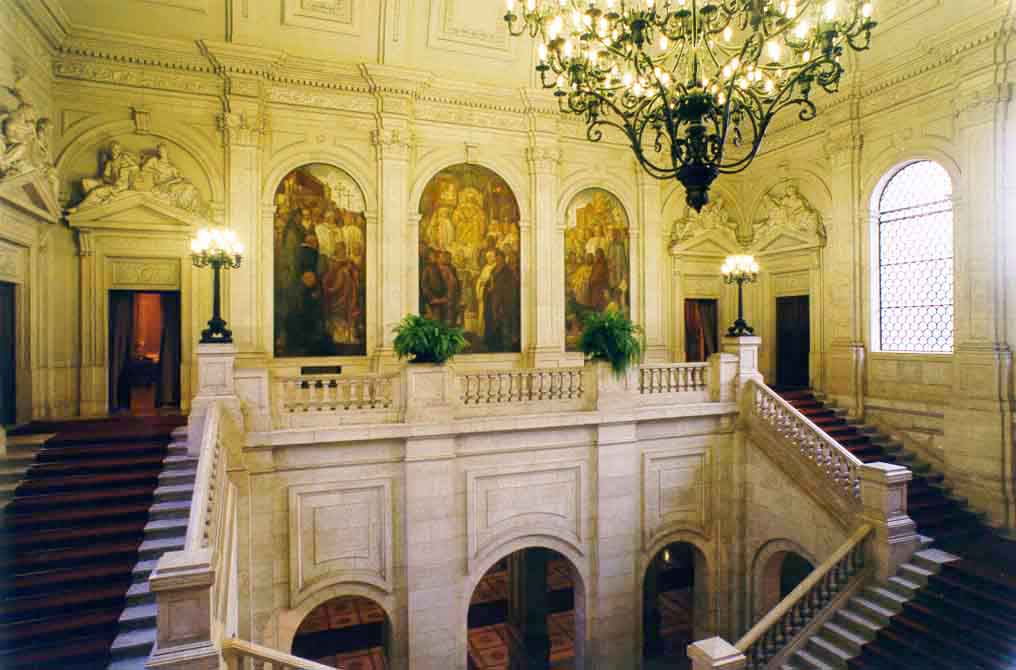
The Escadaria Nobre at the Palácio de São Bento (Assembly of the Republic), where Martins Barata’s triptychs were installed (completed 1944)

In the following decades he executed numerous other large-format works, many of them government commissions for public buildings, including court buildings and ministries.

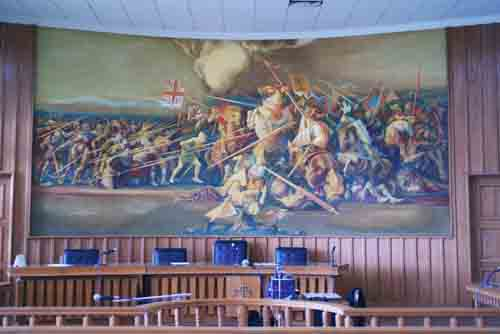
Batalha dos Atoleiros (Battle of Atoleiros), 1966, buon fresco

== Stamps, banknotes and coins ==
In 1938 Martins Barata was invited to design a commemorative stamp for the Exposição do Mundo Português (issued in 1940). The success of that project led CTT to commission further issues and, in 1947, to appoint him as its first Artistic Consultant, a post he held until retirement in 1969.

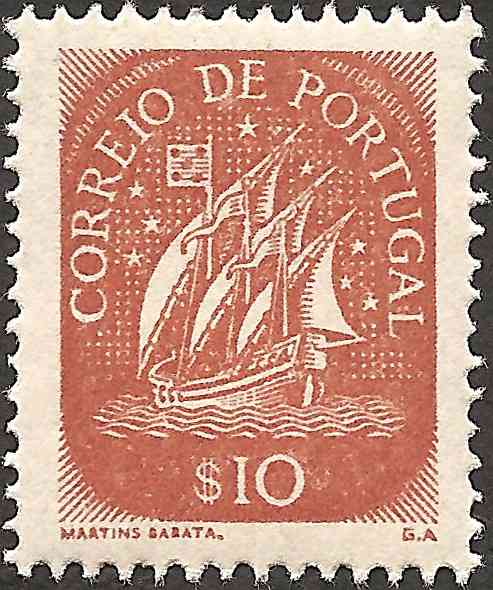
Stamp design Caravela (1943)

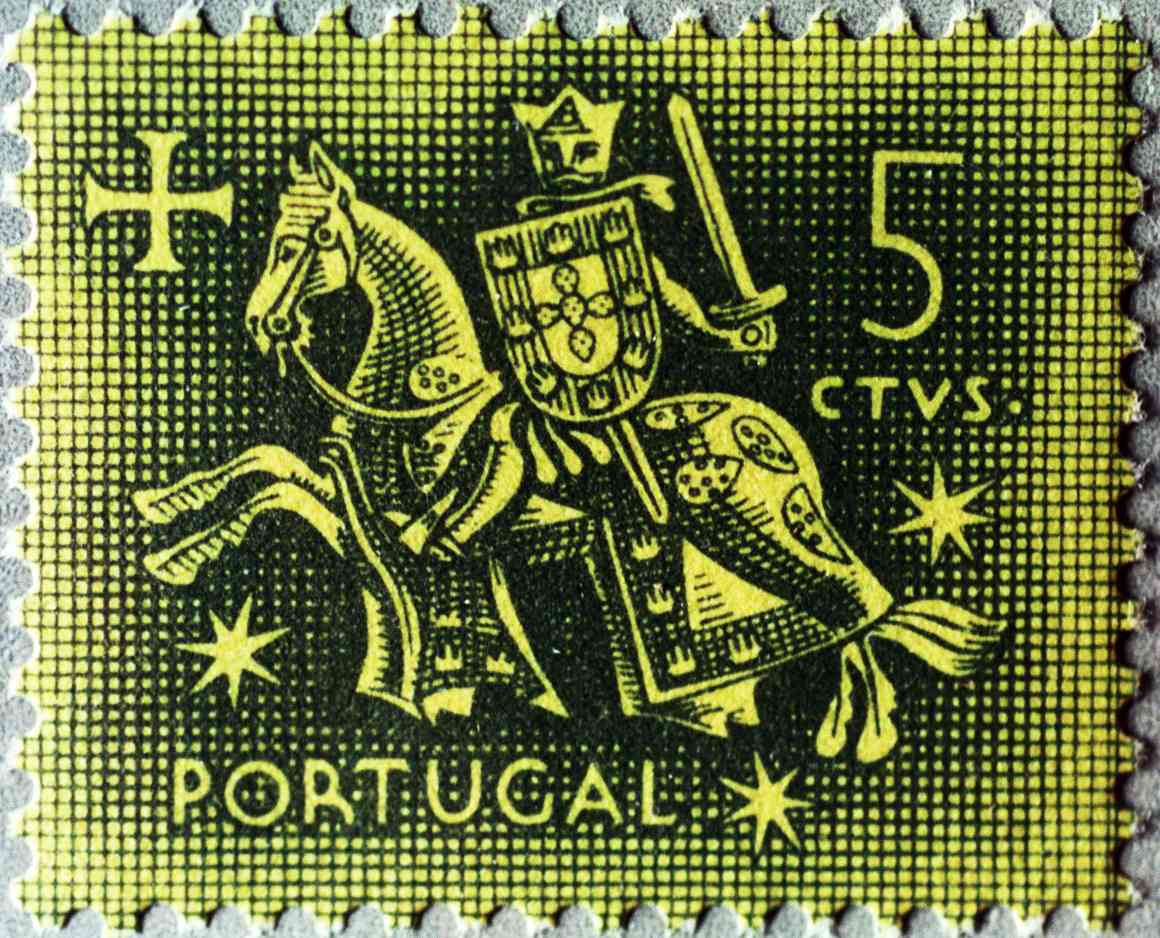
Stamp design Autoridade de D. Dinis (Cavalinho), 1953

Martins Barata also designed banknotes, coins and medals. In 1949, at the request of the Banco de Angola, he designed a series of banknotes (in angolares). In the early 1960s, during a redesign of Portuguese coinage, he produced nautical-themed designs, including a fourteenth–fifteenth-century-style caravel motif used on new coins introduced in 1963.

== Naval archaeology ==
Although not a professional historian, Martins Barata developed a long-standing interest in naval archaeology and the evolution of Portuguese ships during the transition from the late 14th to the 15th century. Over decades he gathered documentation and research on the subject but did not complete his planned book-length study.

== Personal life ==
On 5 January 1926 he married Maria Emília Roque Gameiro (daughter of Alfredo Roque Gameiro). They had four children: Maria Antónia, José Pedro, Alfredo and Maria da Assunção Roque Gameiro Martins Barata.

He died in Campolide, Lisbon, on 15 May 1970, and was buried at the Prazeres Cemetery.

== Selected bibliography ==
- Martins Barata, José Pedro (1988). Retrospectiva da Obra do Pintor Martins Barata. Lisbon: Museu da Cidade.
- Elias, Mário (1997). “Martins Barata, Pintor Alentejano”. In IBN MARUÁN – Revista Cultural do Concelho de Marvão, no. 7. Marvão: Câmara Municipal de Marvão / Edições Colibri, pp. 295–298.
- Cabral, Luís (2024). O Mestre e o Correio-Mor: Jaime Martins Barata, Luís Couto dos Santos e o Selo Português. Lisbon: CTT Correios de Portugal, S.A. ISBN 978-989-8988-31-7.
