= Saturday Club (Kolkata) =

Indian club

- Formation: 1875; 150 years ago
- Location: Kolkata, West Bengal, India

The Saturday Club is an old and heritage club in Kolkata, India.

== History ==
The Saturday Club was established in 1875 in British India by the officers of the Calcutta Light Horse Regiment of British Indian Army. The Club was started at this time by Louis Jackson, a civilian Judge of the Calcutta High Court. It was moved into the present premises at Wood Street, near Mullick Bazar, Kolkata in 1900. It is stated that, for a token sum of Rs 5, one John Carapiet Galstaun allocated the present premises at 7 Wood Street to this Club. The owner of the entire property at 7 Wood Street, Calcutta is the trustees of the Marble Palace of Rajendra Mullick.
