= Lewis Pugh (British Army officer) =

British Army officer

Major-General Lewis Pugh CB CBE DSO**
- Born: 18 May 1907; Glandyfi, Ceredigion, Wales
- Died: 10 March 1981 (aged 76); Wonastow, Monmouthshire, Wales
- Military career
- Allegiance: United Kingdom
- Branch: British Army
- Service years: 1927–1961
- Rank: Major-General
- Service number: 37091
- Unit: Royal Artillery
- Commands: 26th Gurkha Infantry Brigade; 53rd (Welsh) Infantry Division
- Conflicts: Second World War; Malayan Emergency
- Awards: Companion of the Order of the Bath; Commander of the Order of the British Empire; Distinguished Service Order and Two Bars

Major-General Lewis Henry Owain Pugh, CB, CBE, DSO & Two Bars (18 May 1907 – 10 March 1981) was a British Army officer.

== Military career ==
Educated at Wellington College and the Royal Military Academy, Woolwich, Pugh was commissioned into the Royal Artillery on 29 January 1927. He served with the Intelligence Branch of the Indian Police Service in the 1930s.

During the Second World War, he served with the Special Operations Executive in India and, on 9 March 1943, he led Operation Creek which was a covert attack by members of the Calcutta Light Horse and the Calcutta Scottish against a Nazi German merchant ship, the Ehrenfels, which had been transmitting information to U-boats from Mormugao Harbour in neutral Portugal's territory of Goa.

After the war he became commander of the 26th Gurkha Infantry Brigade in November 1949 during the Malayan Emergency, brigadier on the general staff at the Military Training Directorate in September 1952 and Deputy Director of Military Operations at the War Office in November 1953. He went on to be Chief of Staff for Far East Land Forces in January 1956 and General Officer Commanding the 53rd (Welsh) Infantry Division in January 1958 before retiring in February 1961.

Pugh was High Sheriff of Cardiganshire in 1964. He was also colonel of the 2nd King Edward VII's Own Gurkha Rifles (The Sirmoor Rifles) from 1956 to 1969.

== In popular culture ==
Gregory Peck played Pugh in the 1980 war film The Sea Wolves, which was based on Operation Creek.

Military offices
Preceded by William Cox	GOC 53rd (Welsh) Infantry Division; 1958–1961	Succeeded by Richard Frisby
