= Cord 810/812 =

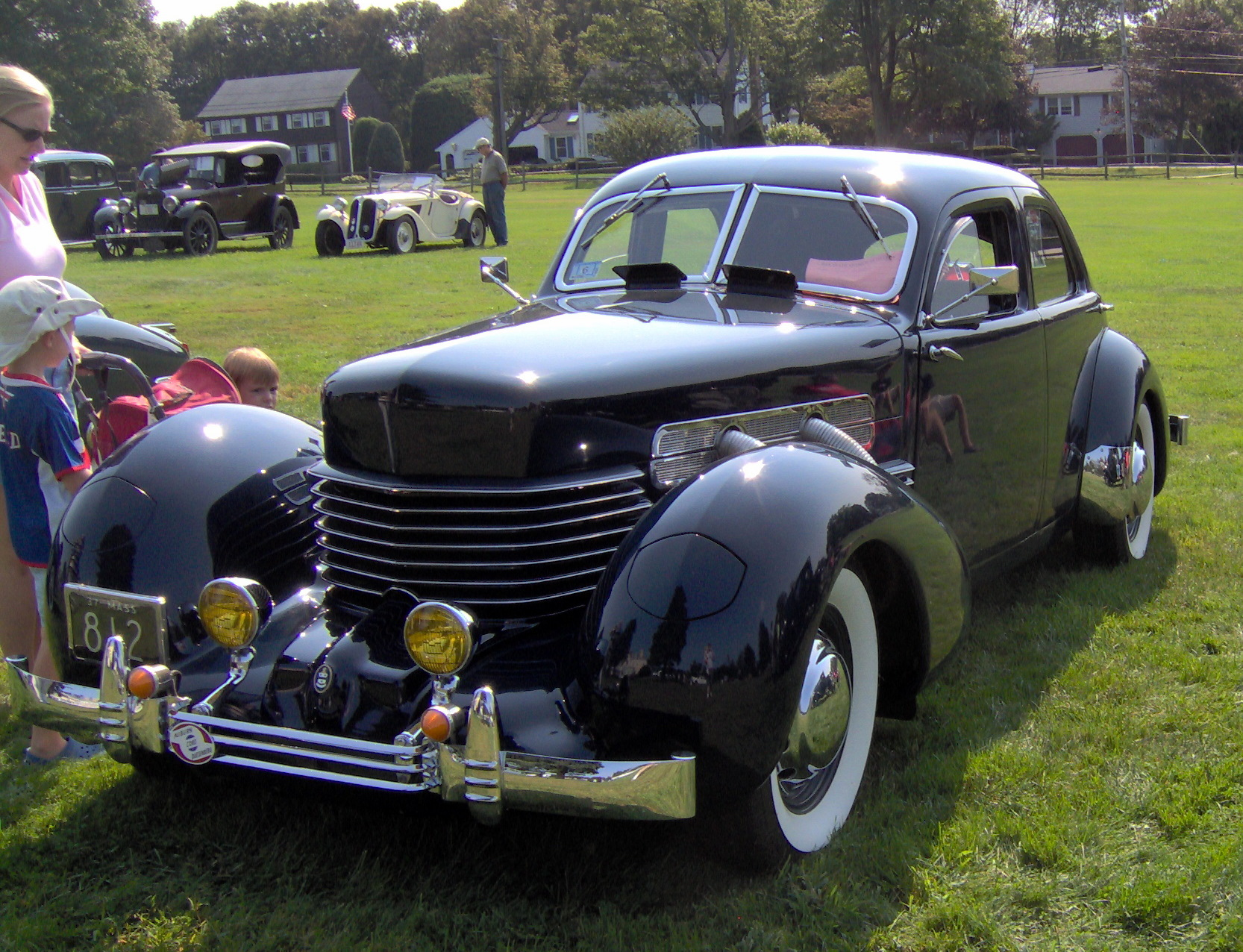
- 1937 812 Sedan

Overview
- Manufacturer: Cord Automobile
- Production: 1936–1937
- Model years: 1936–1937
- Designer: Gordon Buehrig, Vince Gardner, Alex Tremulis

Body and chassis
- Class: Luxury car
- Body style: 4-door sedan 2-door convertible coupe 4-door convertible sedan
- Layout: Front-mid-engine, front-wheel-drive layout

Powertrain
- Engine: 288.6 cu in (4.7 L) Lycoming FB V8
- Transmission: 4-speed vacuum-servo semi-automatic (Bendix pre-selector)

Dimensions
- Wheelbase: 125 in (3,175 mm); 132 in (3,353 mm) (Custom/Berline)
- Length: 195.5 in (4,966 mm)
- Width: 71 in (1,803 mm)
- Curb weight: 4,110 lb (1,864 kg)

Chronology
- Predecessor: Cord L-29; Cord E-1

The Cord 810, and later Cord 812, is a luxury automobile that was produced by the Cord Automobile division of the Auburn Automobile Company in 1936 and 1937. It was the first American-designed and built front wheel drive car with independent front suspension. It was preceded by Cord's own 1929 Cord L-29, and the French 1934 Citroën Traction Avant front wheel drive cars, but the 810/812 was commercially less successful than these.

The Cord 810 and 812 were also the first production cars to feature hidden/pop-up headlights. Additionally, the radical new styling of its nose completely replaced the traditional radiator grille, in favor of horizontal louvers, that curved all around the sides of the nose, earning the car's styling the nickname of 'coffin nose'.

== History ==
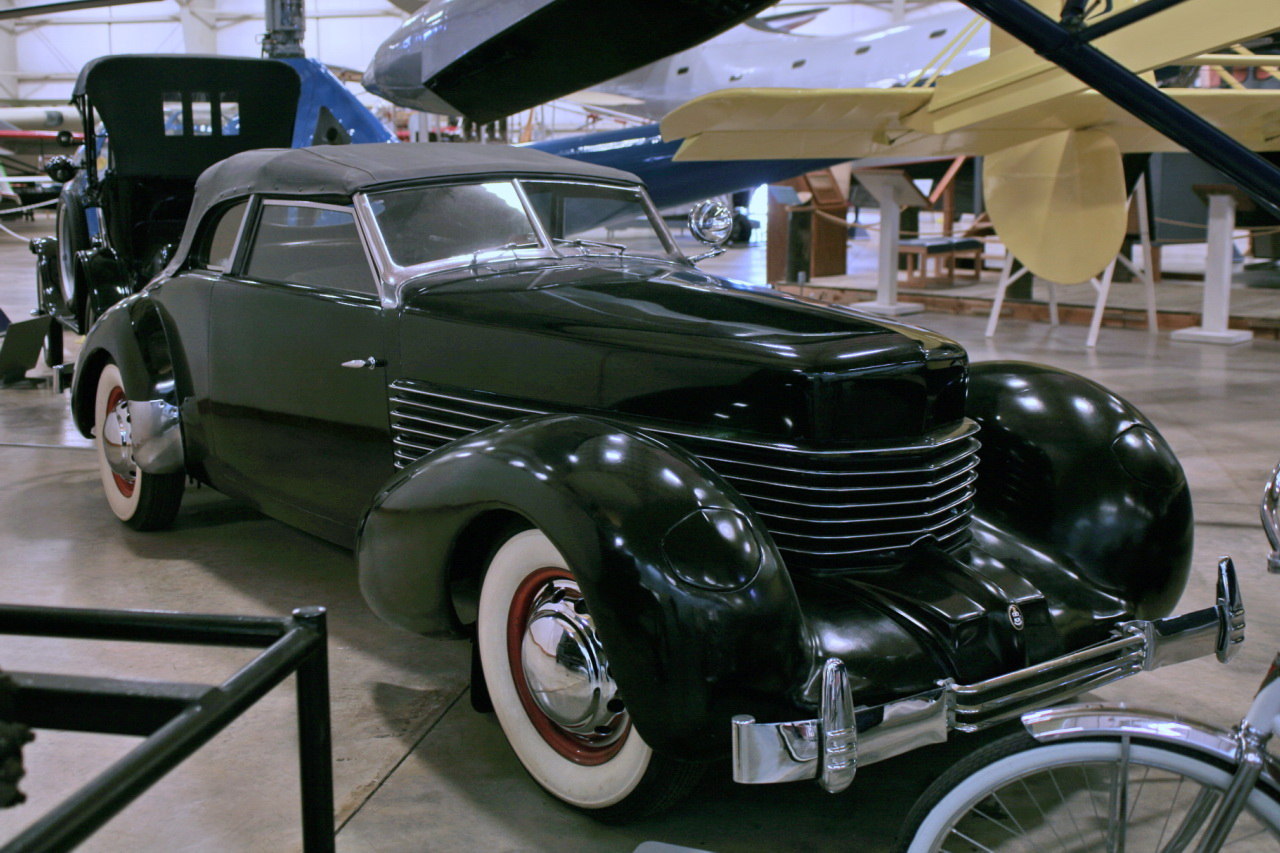
1936 Cord 810 Phaeton

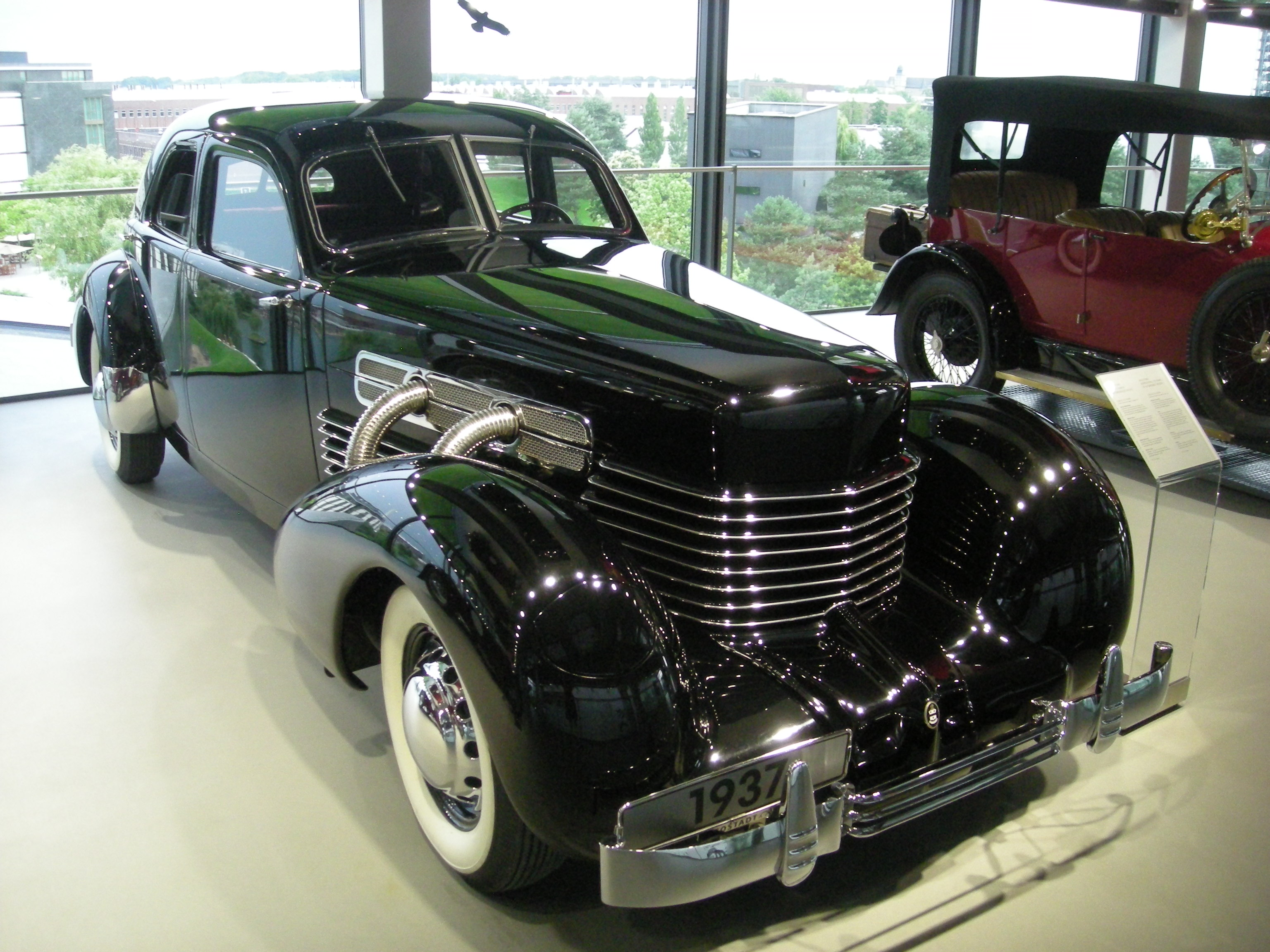
Supercharged 1937 Cord 812 Sedan

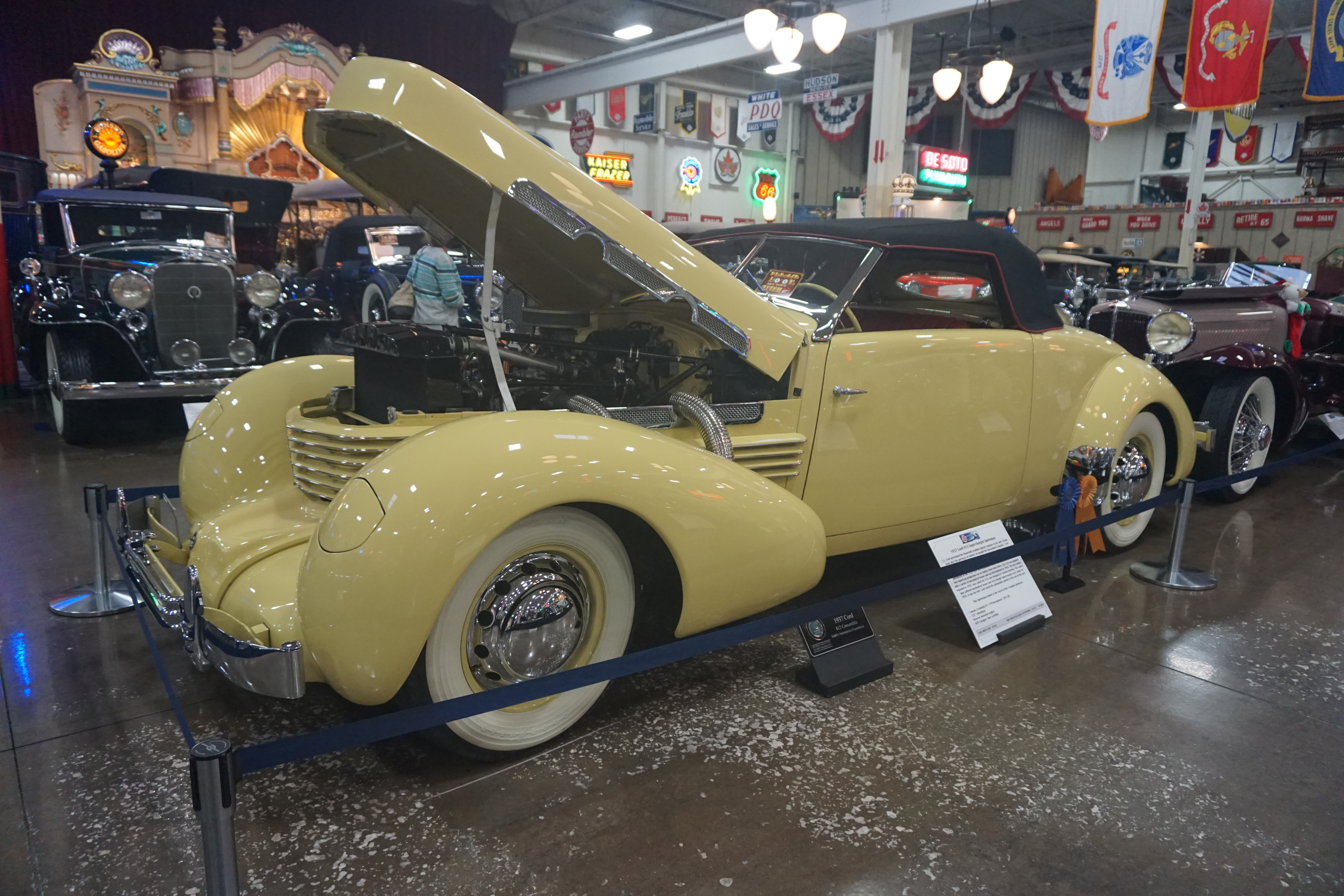
1937 Cord 812 Supercharged Sportsman

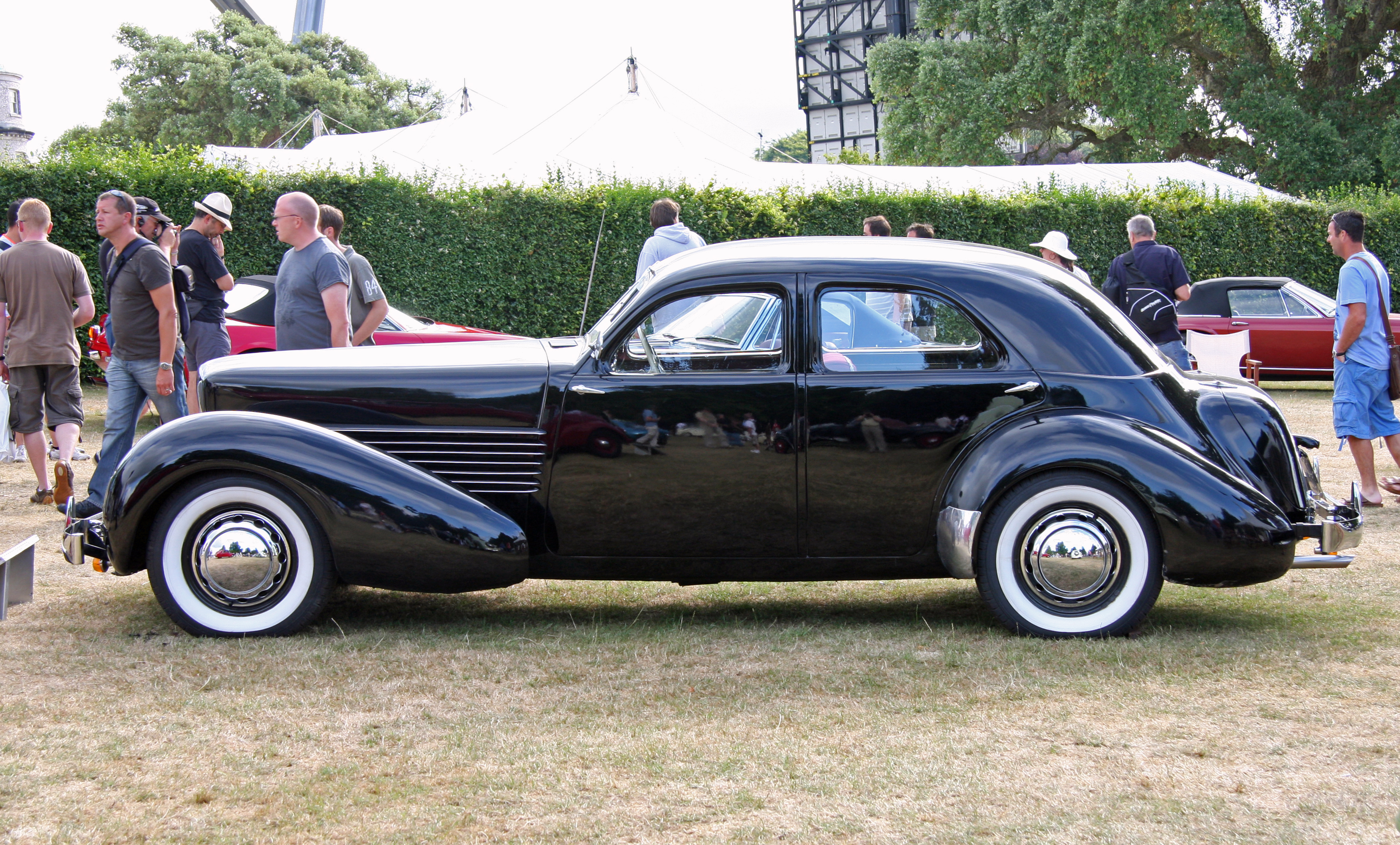
1937 Cord 812 Beverly

The styling of the Cord 810 was the work of designer Gordon M. Buehrig and his team of stylists, which included young Vince Gardner and Alex Tremulis. The first American front-wheel-drive car featured independent front suspension with a tube rear axle with semi-elliptic rear springs. Power came from a 4,739 cc (289 cu in) Lycoming V8 of the same 125 hp (93 kW) as the L-29. The semi-automatic four-speed transmission (three plus overdrive) extended in front of the engine, like on the earlier Cord L-29. This allowed Buehrig to eliminate the driveshaft and transmission tunnel. Accentuating its sleek, low-slung look, it also dispensed with running boards. It had a 125 in (3,175 mm) wheelbase (shared with several 812 body styles), and in 1936 came in four models: the entry-level sedan at US$1995, the Beverly sedan ($2095), Sportsman ($2145), and Phaeton ($2195). The 1937 812s had the same models, priced $2445, $2545, $2585, and $2645, plus two more, on a 132 in (3,400 mm) wheelbase, the $2960 Custom Beverly and $3060 Custom Berline called the Westchester.

Reportedly conceived as a Duesenberg and nearly devoid of chrome, the 810 had hidden door hinges and rear-hinged hood, rather than the side-opening type more usual at the time, both new items. It featured pontoon fenders with hidden headlamps (modified Stinson landing lights) (E. L. Cord owned a majority of Stinson stock) that disappeared into the fenders via dashboard hand cranks. This car was the first and one of the few ever to include this feature.

It also featured a concealed lockable fuel filler door and variable-speed windshield wipers (at a time when wipers were often operated by intake vacuum, and so tended to stop when the driver stepped on the gas pedal). Its engine-turned dashboard included complete instrumentation, a tachometer, and standard radio (which did not become an industry standard offering until well into the 1950s). The most famous feature was the "coffin nose" that gave the vehicle its nickname; it featured a horizontally louvered wraparound grille, a product of Buehrig's desire not to have a conventional vertical grille.

The car caused a sensation at its debut at the New York Auto Show in November 1935. The crowds were so dense attendees stood on the bumpers of nearby cars to get a look. Cord had rushed to build the 100 cars needed to qualify for the show, but the transmission was not ready. Even so, Cord took many orders there, promising Christmas delivery. Expected production of 1,000 cars per month failed however to materialize, as the semi-automatic transmission proved more troublesome than expected. The first production cars were not ready to deliver until February, and did not reach New York City until April 1936. In all, Cord managed to sell only 1,174 of the new 810 in its first model year, as the result of mechanical troubles.

Supercharging was made available with a mechanically driven Schwitzer-Cummins unit. Supercharged 1936 models were called 810S and 1937 models were called 812S. Supercharged models were distinguished from the normally aspirated models by the brilliant chrome-plated external exhaust pipes mounted on each side of the hood and grille. With supercharging, horsepower was raised to 170.

Early reliability problems, including slipping out of gear and vapor lock, cooled initial enthusiasm. Although most new owners loved their sleek fast cars, the dealer base shrank rapidly. Unsold left-over and in-process 1936 810 models were re-numbered and sold as 1937 812 models. Total 810/812 production was 2,972 cars, including 205 convertible cabriolets, including the one-off prototype 1938 Custom Cabriolet, before the production ended in 1937.

Cord had planned some mechanical updates and cosmetic changes to the 1938 model, probably named 814. The production ended before the 1938 model could be launched. A single 814 prototype was built and kept in the storage for many years until it was discovered in 1989. The current owner was unaware of its provenance when he purchased it, and he used the factory archival photos and drawings to confirm it was a 814 prototype.

Aside from the small production of SAMCO Cord 8/10 (1964 to 1966), Cord 810/812 was the last American front-wheel-drive cars for almost thirty years until the debut of the Oldsmobile Toronado in 1966, followed by a heavily redesigned Cadillac Eldorado in 1967. Both these GM divisional halo cars paid homage to 810/812 hidden headlamps. The second-generation Toronado introduced a hood design that resembled the 810/812 coffin nose and horizontal cooling grille.

The longitudinal layout of placing the transmission in front of axle and the engine behind the axle was never used again in the American front-wheel-drive vehicles to this day. The most common arrangement is transverse mount and, the less common is longitudinal mount with engine ahead of axle and transmission behind (a.k.a. Eagle Premier and Chrysler LH, for instance).

British author James Leasor owned two Cords, an 810 and an 812. One of the characters in his novels, Jason Love, owns one, a roadster. All of his novels that features Jason Love includes Cord. The 1965 movie Where the Spies Are had Love promised an ultra-rare Cord LeBaron in return for agreeing to carry out a mission for MI-6.

In the 1938 film "Gangster's Boy" starring Jackie Cooper, the main character drives a white 1937 Cord 812SC Sportman.

== Hupmobile/Graham ==
In 1940 ailing automakers Hupmobile and Graham-Paige tried to save money and revive the companies, by using the 810/812 body dies. Except for their external similarity to the 810, Graham-Paige 4-door sedans, the Hupmobile Skylark, and the Graham Hollywood, were unremarkable. Retractable headlights gave way to plain headlight pods, and power came from a standard front-engine/rear-wheel drive design. Only about 1,900 were built before model year 1941 production ceased in the fall of 1940.

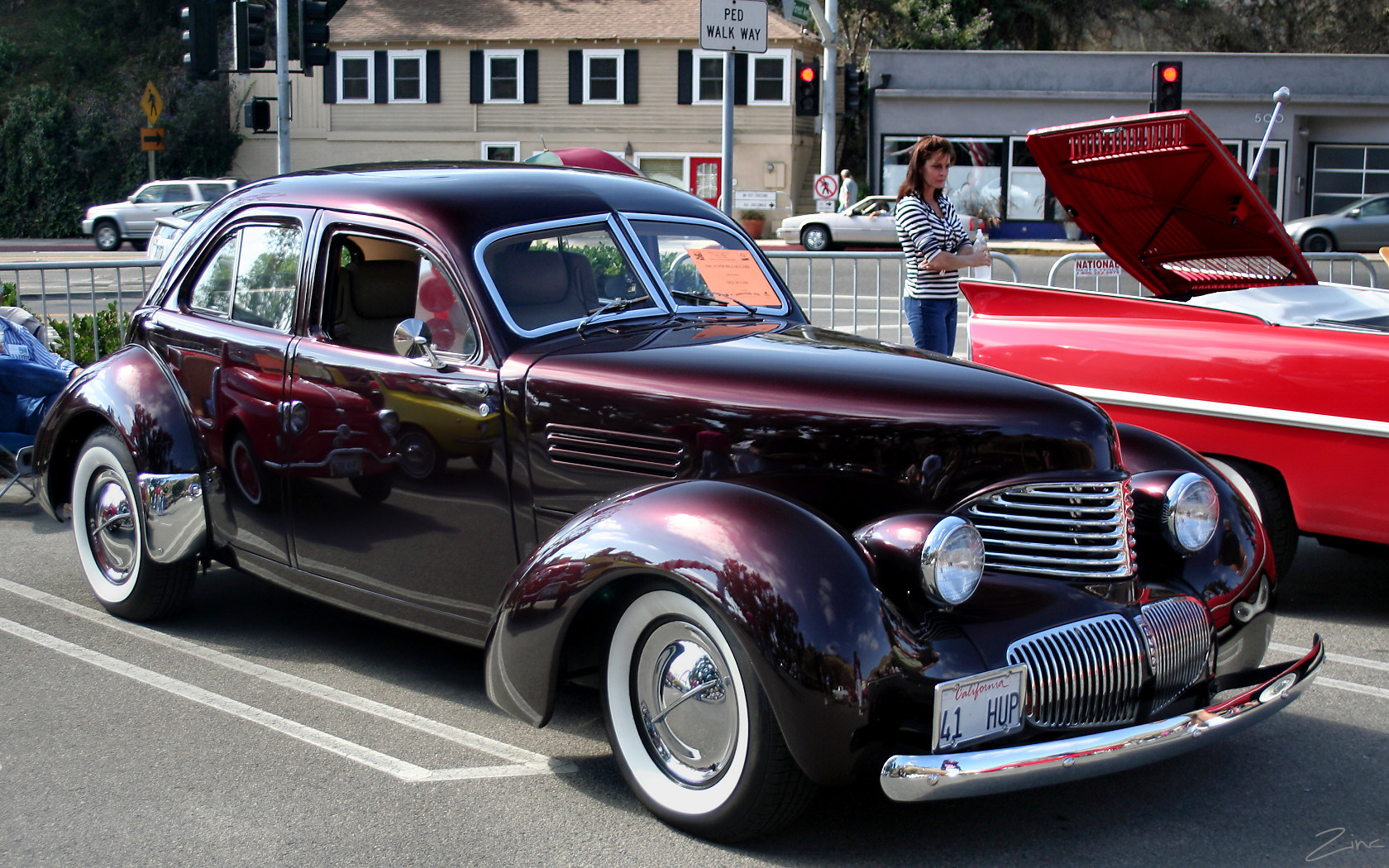
Hupmobile Skylark (1941)

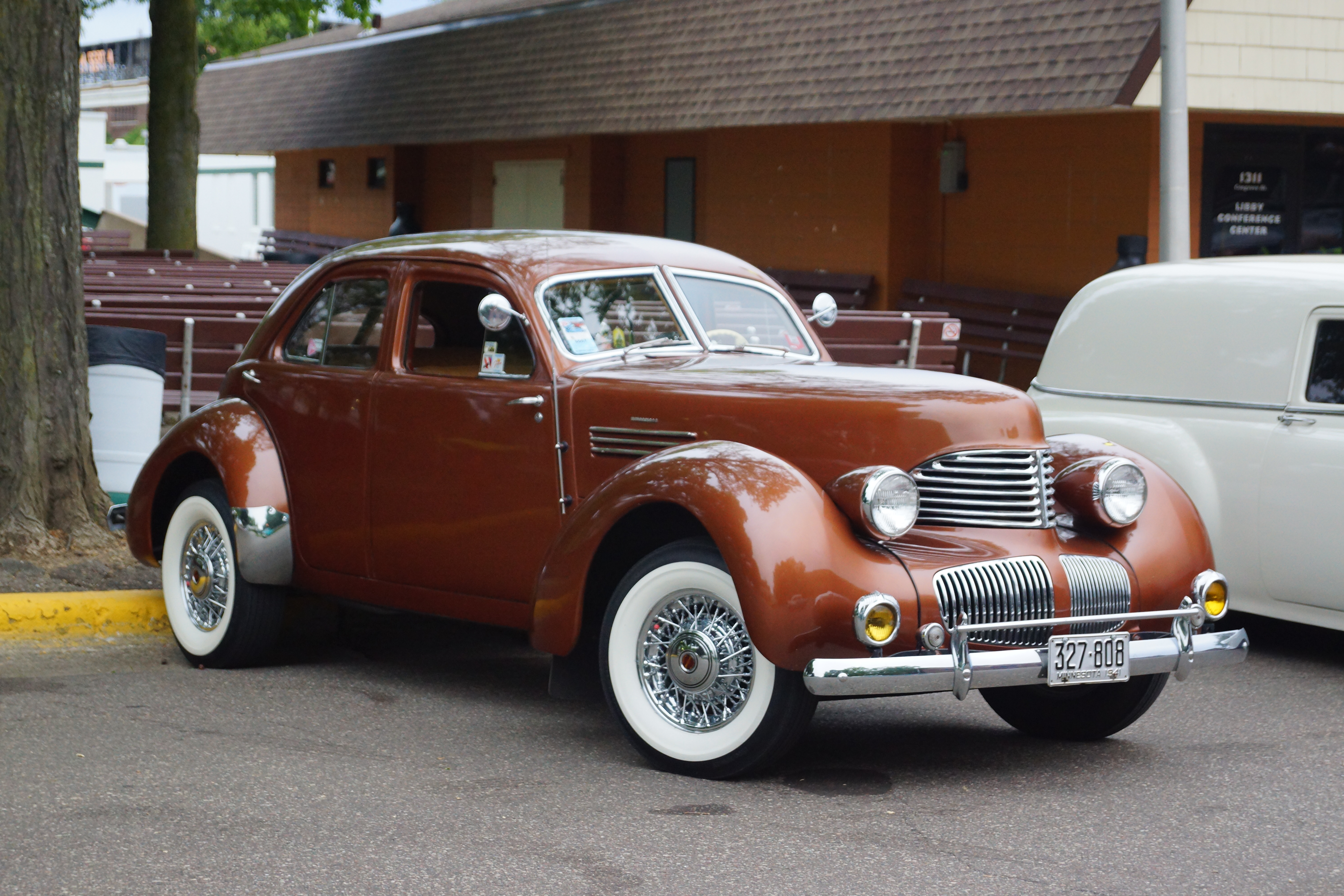
Graham Hollywood (1941)

== Revival ==
Between 1964 and 1970, two further attempts were made to replicate the original Buehrig design for limited production. Both Tulsa, Oklahoma-based companies soon halted production amid financial difficulties. The 1966 replica Cord 8/10 was powered by a Corvair drivetrain (the "8/10" designation represented the actual scale of the car), while the 1968 through 1970 models were Ford and Chrysler powered.

The design of the Cord 810/812 has received considerable critical praise. In 1996, “American Heritage” magazine named the Cord 810 sedan “The Single Most Beautiful American Car”. A “Classic Cord” convertible coupé was produced as a Hot Wheels die-cast toy; as of 2006, examples in unopened packaging sold for up to US$800.

== Specifications ==
- Length: 195.5 in (4,966 mm)
- Wheelbase: 125 in (3,200 mm)
- Width: 71.0 in (1,803 mm)
- Height: 60.0 in (1,524 mm)
- Weight: 4,110 lb (1,860 kg)
- Ground clearance: 9 in (229 mm)
- Horsepower: 125 hp (170 hp w/ supercharger)
- Brakes: 12 in (305 mm) hydraulic drums
- Front suspension: Independent with trailing arms, leaf springs and friction shocks.

== Sources ==
- Malks, Josh B. Cord 810/812: The Timeless Classic.
- Wise, David Burgess. "Cord: The Apex of a Triangle", in Northey, Tom, ed. World of Automobiles, Vol. 4, pp. 435–7. London: Orbis, 1974.
