= Calcutta Scottish =

- Active: 1914–1947
- Country: British India
- Allegiance: United Kingdom
- Branch: Auxiliary Force
- Type: Infantry Regiment
- Headquarters: Calcutta
- Motto(s): Per Ardua Stabilis Esto ("Be firm through difficulties")
- Engagements: World War I World War II

The Calcutta Scottish was a regiment of volunteers of Scottish descent raised in 1914 as an infantry regiment of the British Indian Army. The regiment formed part of the army reserves of the Auxiliary Force, India (AFI). The regimental dress uniform was Hunting Stewart tartan. The regiment was disbanded following India's independence in 1947.

== History ==
=== Formation ===
An attempt was made to raise two kilted companies of "Calcutta Scottish" within the Calcutta Rifles, but apparently without success. This may account for the date for the raising of the Regiment being given as 1 August 1911 in Major Donovan Jackson’s work India’s Army. On 1 August 1914, The Calcutta Scottish Volunteers were formed as part of the Indian Volunteer Force. King's and Regimental Colours were awarded.

=== First World War ===
The regiment probably deployed only as individual reinforcements. Some officers are known to have gone to East Africa, but there is no other record of deployment as a unit. There is reference to Calcutta Volunteer Machine Guns armed with Maxim guns which may have included officers and men from the Calcutta Scottish.

On 1 April 1917, the regiment was redesignated the 44th Calcutta Scottish. In 1919, the 44th was called out for over two months to deal with "communal riots".

=== Interwar period ===
On 1 October 1920, the regiment was redesignated The Calcutta Scottish (Army Auxiliary Force, India) and in 1921 included a Light Motor Patrol armed with Maxim guns (later Vickers, then Lewis, then Brens) but mounted in private cars.

In 1921 the Prince of Wales visited the East in HMS Renown and on a visit to the city on 24 December inspected the Calcutta Scottish. In 1926 the unit was called out for over two months, (reason not known, possibly riots?) and was again inspected by the Prince of Wales in 1928.

In 1930 the Calcutta Scottish was called out as an aid to the civil power for over two months, during which small detachments were deployed on 18 occasions.

=== Second World War ===
The regiment provided a detachment of four men for "Operation Creek", a SOE operation against Axis shipping in Goa in 1942. The lead unit was the Calcutta Light Horse. In 1946 the regiment was reorganised to consist of an HQ, two companies and four motor platoons, and was disbanded in 1947 upon India's independence.

== Uniform ==
- Badge: The Cross of St Andrew with the coat of arms of Calcutta superimposed, in the upper angle of the cross: a crown.
- Jacket: 1920: Scarlet jacket with white facings. By 1946: Scarlet jacket with yellow facings.
- Kilt: Hunting Stewart tartan. Rarely worn during World War II.
- Glengarry: 1914-20: Diced Green and white. By 1946: Royal blue with same colour ribbons (Argyle?). Also red and black check/diced. Sun helmets were also worn a lot of the time.
- Hose Tops: 1914-20: Green and white. By 1946: Tartan with red flashes. Also red and black check/diced.

== Accoutrements ==
- King’s and Regimental Colours: Passed originally to the London Scottish and in 1953 by them to the United Services Museum in Edinburgh Castle.
- Regimental Silver: Passed originally to the London Scottish Regiment and displayed in Edinburgh Castle in 1951.
- Regimental Journal: Calcutta Scottish Regimental Chronicle.

== Operations ==
Operation Creek was described in the 1978 book Boarding Party by James Leasor. A "factional" account in which, for ostensibly deniable purposes, the Calcutta Light Horse, reinforced by four members of the Calcutta Scottish, raided the neutral port of Marmagoa on 9 March 1943. In the port, the German ship Ehrenfels had been providing information to three German U-boats, on the movement of Allied shipping with the result that some 250,000 tons of British shipping had been sunk over a period of 45 days. After a journey from Calcutta, via Bombay, in the hopper barge Phoebe, the Ehrenfels was boarded and destroyed along with two other German ships, and one Italian ship. The film The Sea Wolves, released in June 1981, was based on the book and starred Gregory Peck, Roger Moore, David Niven and Trevor Howard. It was filmed on location in Goa.
