= The Operation (Play for Today) =

- Play for Today episode
- Episode no.: Series 3 Episode 18
- Directed by: Roy Battersby
- Written by: Roger Smith
- Original air date: 26 February 1973

Episode chronology
← Previous "For Sylvia Or The Air Show"	Next → "Access To The Children"

"The Operation" is the 18th episode of third season of the British BBC anthology TV series Play for Today. The episode was a television play that was originally broadcast on 26 February 1973. "The Operation" was written by Roger Smith, directed by Roy Battersby, produced by Kenith Trodd, and starred George Lazenby. The episode is about an asset stripper trying to buy up a row of houses.

== Plot ==
David Alder, a British property magnate educated in Australia, wants to develop a real estate site in his old home town of Snelgrove that involves knocking down an old building.

At a dinner in Snelgrove, he meets a couple, Ted and Diane Hardin. David dances with Diane. He then contacts an old friend he has not seen in two years, George Timmins, and explains he has been seeing Diane. David says Diane wants to meet some of his friends, and George is the only one David has. Although George has been unemployed for years, David tells Diane that George is a successful screenwriter.

David and George attend a party at Ted and Diane's house which winds up as a key party. George stays the night and discovers Ted is a grocer.

David, George and Diane go on holiday together at David's holiday house. David buys Diane some lingerie, then leaves to go back to the city. Diane and George spend the night together platonically.

Ted visits David at the latter's office and says he wants advice. A property developer wants Ted to get out of the business, but Ted is reluctant, as his family has been there for forty years. Ted asks David for advice how to fight it and David admits his company is the developer. David advises him to take the offer saying the building will fall down in a few years and that Ted can have a lease in the new building.

David invites a councillor over to his house to persuade him to compulsorily acquire Ted's lease. The councillor is reluctant, but David plies him with drink and arranges for a woman to perform oral sex on the man, which David has photographed.

David invites Diane to move in with him. Diane writes Ted a letter saying she is leaving. In a rage, Ted sets fire to some items.

David offers George a job and the latter agrees; he offers Diane anything she wants and she asks for plastic surgery.

The building is knocked down. David reveals he will make a million pounds on the deal. When a drunken George asks David if money is the answer to all things, and he replies "yes".

David dresses up in a uniform and engages in bondage with Diane. Ted stumbles in and shoots David and Diane dead.

In closing, George tells the camera happened next: Ted is sent to Broadmoor Hospital; the share price of the company drops, but picks up when it is announced business will continue; The Sunday Times pays £12,000 for the rights to the story; a new building is constructed on the site. The end caption reads "any similarity to characters living or dead is merely evidence of our times".

== Cast ==
- George Lazenby as David Alder
- Tom Kempinski as George Timmins
- Maurice Roëves as Ted Hardin
- Maureen Shaw as Diane Hardin
- John Ralpey as Chief Rotarian
- Patsy Smart as cleaner

== Reception ==
The TV critic for The Times called it a "tedious affair":

The males had got lost somewhere between John Osborne's Angry Young Men and some future sequel to Last Tango in Paris... We had wife swappings, a casino, a lavatory, an Irish hideaway, Rolls Royces and other environmental titbits... Influenced no doubt by the presence of a film star in the cast the camera lingered self consciously on profiles when it was not lingering self consciously even more on the furniture. George Lazenby, the star in question, brought to the part of the magnate a lazy, self conscious insolence that suited the odious fellow well. The rest had little to do except let the camera wander over their faces.

— Leonard Buckley, "The Operation.", The Times

The Spectator called it:

As insulting a piece of meretricious rubbish as I have seen in a long and weary while... a jejune fantasy of power and wealth. George Lazenby... [acts] with all the life and conviction of a garden gnome... Why not just laugh the whole thing off as a silly piece of nonsense? Why feel angry? Because this was put out by the BBC as a serious treatment of serious themes, a 'play for today,' God help us. In this context I found it insulting.

— Clive Gammon, "Television: Barrel's bottom", The Spectator

== Controversy ==
The play led to the BBC being criticised by its advisory council for its use of bad language, and depiction of sextortion and wife swapping.
