= Where the Spies Are =

1965 British film by Val Guest

- Theatrical release poster
- Directed by: Val Guest
- Written by: James Leasor; Wolf Mankowitz; Val Guest
- Based on: novel Passport to Oblivion by James Leasor
- Produced by: Val Guest; Steven Pallos
- Starring: David Niven; Françoise Dorléac; John Le Mesurier; Cyril Cusack
- Cinematography: Arthur Grant
- Edited by: Bill Lenny
- Music by: Mario Nascimbene
- Production company: Metro-Goldwyn-Mayer
- Distributed by: Metro-Goldwyn-Mayer
- Release dates: May 1965 (UK); January 1966 (US)
- Running time: 110 minutes
- Country: United Kingdom
- Language: English
- Box office: $1.2 million (est. US/ Canada rentals)

Where the Spies Are is a 1965 British comedy adventure film directed by Val Guest and starring David Niven, Françoise Dorléac, John Le Mesurier, Cyril Cusack and Richard Marner. It was based on the 1964 James Leasor book Passport to Oblivion, which was also the working title of the film. MGM intended to make a Jason Love film series, but the idea was shelved.

== Plot ==
Rosser, a British agent, disappears in Beirut. British intelligence boss MacGillivray has difficulty finding a trained agent on short notice, so he recruits Doctor Jason Love, who did some intelligence work for him in World War II, to find out what is going on. As a doctor, Love can attend a medical convention there without attracting suspicion.

Love stops off in Rome and meets his contact there, a fashion model named Vikki. The two get along so well, Love misses his flight to Beirut. As he watches it depart without him, the plane explodes in mid-air.

Love arrives in Beirut and meets another agent, Parkington. Together they discover a communist plot to assassinate the pro-British Prince of Zahlouf, thereby threatening Britain's eastern oil treaties. Parkington is killed by an enemy agent after the latter reveals that Rosser is dead. Returning to his hotel room, Love is surprised to find Vikki waiting there. Vikki is supposedly there on a photoshoot, but reveals that she is a double agent and warns him to get out of Beirut as soon as possible.

Having discovered the assassination plot, Love manages to foil it by wrestling a rifle out of the hands of the hitman masquerading as one of the background "Arabs" in Vicki's photoshoot. The rifle goes off, hitting someone else in the crowd that had assembled to see the Prince. Love, holding the rifle, is mistaken for the erstwhile assassin by an angry mob. The mob chases him onto a nearby roof. He is "rescued" by a helicopter, only to discover that it is crewed by the Russians, who came to pick up the assassin, not to save him.

Stanilaus, the top Russian spy in the region, smuggles him aboard the "Dove of Peace", a jet returning to Russia after a propaganda tour of the world, and tries to extract information from him. Love tells him the truth, but Stanilaus does not believe him. Also on board is Vikki, returning to learn what her next assignment will be.

Simmias, the Russian agent responsible for orchestrating the assassination, defects, fearing the consequences of his failure; he reveals Love's predicament to the British. When the plane flies over Canada, the British arrange a fake emergency and request that the jet land to transport victims out, but Stanilaus refuses. However, Love is able to activate a device hidden in a cavity in his tooth that disrupts the jet's avionics, and Stanlaus reluctantly agrees to help. On the ground, however, he becomes suspicious when there are no victims in sight and orders the jet to take off. Vikki shoots him, enabling Love to escape, but she is killed in turn.

== Cast ==
- David Niven as Dr. Jason Love
- Françoise Dorléac as Vikki
- John Le Mesurier as MacGillivray
- Cyril Cusack as Rosser
- Eric Pohlmann as Farouk
- Richard Marner as Josef
- Paul Stassino as Simmias
- George Pravda as 1st Agent
- Noel Harrison as Jackson
- Ronald Radd as Stanilaus
- Alan Gifford as Security
- Bill Nagy as Aeradio
- George Mikell as Assassin
- Nigel Davenport as Parkington
- Geoffrey Bayldon as Lecturer
- Derek Partridge as Duty Officer
- Robert Raglan as Sir Robert
- Basil Dignam as Major Harding
- Gordon Tanner as Inspector

== Production ==
Val Guest read James Leason's novel Passport to Oblivion and liked it. He went into partnership with David Niven and MGM agreed to finance, inspired by the success of the James Bond films. MGM insisted the movie be retitled.

Niven was also making Lady L for MGM at the same time but the studio arranged the schedule accordingly. Françoise Dorléac was cast off the back of her success in That Man from Rio.

Filming took place at MGM-British Studios in Borehamwood and on location in England and Beirut.

Alfredo Antonini served as the orchestra conductor for the film.

David Niven and Val Guest took an option on the next five James Leasor books about Jason Love. Two of them were written - Passport to Peril and Passport to Peking - with three unwritten.

A 2019 audiobook version of the novel entitled Passport to Oblivion features George Lazenby as Dr. Jason Love.
