= William Reginald Cox =

British Army general (1905–1988)

Major-General William Reginald Cox CB DSO
- Born: 13 June 1905; Herefordshire, England
- Died: 12 June 1988 (aged 82); Salisbury, Wiltshire, England
- Military career
- Allegiance: United Kingdom
- Branch: British Army
- Service years: 1925–1960
- Rank: Major-General
- Service number: 31910
- Unit: King's Shropshire Light Infantry
- Commands: 11th Battalion, Worcestershire Regiment; 1st Battalion, Worcestershire Regiment; 131st Infantry Brigade; 69th Infantry Brigade; 129th Infantry Brigade; 53rd (Welsh) Infantry Division
- Conflicts: World War II
- Awards: Companion of the Order of the Bath; Distinguished Service Order

Major-General William Reginald Cox CB DSO (13 June 1905 – 12 June 1988) was a senior British Army officer who commanded the 1st Battalion, Worcestershire Regiment in the Western European Campaign from June 1944 until Victory in Europe Day in May 1945. He later served as colonel of the King's Shropshire Light Infantry.

== Military career ==
Educated at the Royal Military College, Sandhurst, Cox joined the British Army and was commissioned as a second lieutenant in the King's Shropshire Light Infantry on 29 January 1925.

After attending the Staff College, Camberley, he served in World War II, initially as a staff officer and then as Commanding Officer (CO) of the 11th Battalion, Worcestershire Regiment from July 1942 (reconstituted as the 1st Battalion, Worcestershire Regiment from January 1943) until September 1943. Towards the end of the war he commanded the 131st Infantry Brigade of the 7th Armoured Division, the 69th Infantry Brigade of the 50th (Northumbrian) Infantry Division and the 129th Infantry Brigade of the 43rd (Wessex) Infantry Division.

After the war he became brigadier on the general staff at Western Command in 1948, deputy director of Infantry in June 1953 and Chief of Staff at Southern Command in March 1954. He went on to be General Officer Commanding (GOC) Mid West District and 53rd (Welsh) Infantry Division in March 1955 and Director, Territorial Army, Cadets and Home Guard in February 1958. He retired in August 1960.

Cox became colonel of the King's Shropshire Light Infantry in November 1957. He died on 12 June 1988 at Salisbury.

Military offices
Preceded by Edric Bastyan	GOC 53rd (Welsh) Infantry Division; 1955–1958	Succeeded by Lewis Pugh
Honorary titles
Preceded by Sir Ernest Down	Colonel of the King's Shropshire Light Infantry; 1957–1963	Succeeded by Geoffrey Musson
