= Operation Creek =

1943 attack on German ship transmitting information to U-boats from Goa

- Part of Indian Ocean in World War II
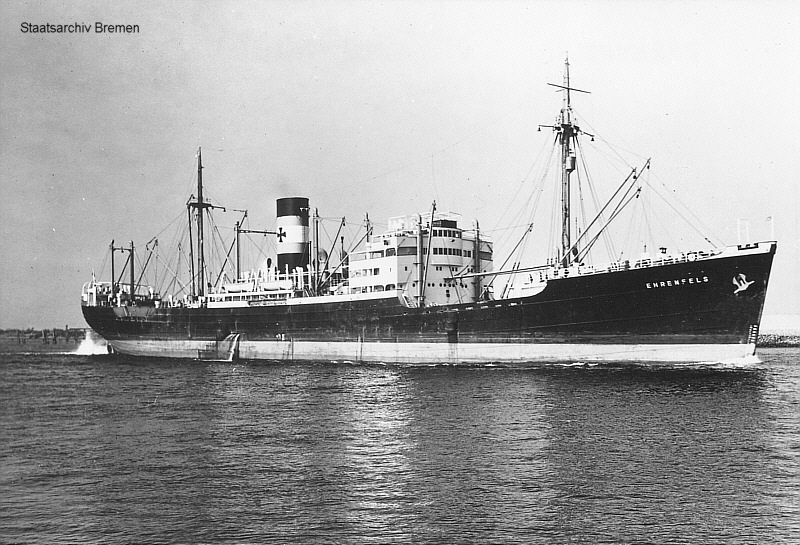
- The German cargo ship Ehrenfels
Date	9 March 1943
Location	Mormugão, Portuguese Goa 15°24′19″N 73°48′31″E
Result	British victory

Belligerents
United Kingdom	Germany; Italy

Commanders and leaders
Special Operations Executive	

Units involved
Calcutta Light Horse; Calcutta Scottish	

Strength
18 soldiers	4 ships

Casualties and losses
1 injured	4 ships sunk 5 killed, 5 missing & rest interned
- Location within Goa Operation Creek (India)

Operation Creek, also known as Operation Longshanks, was a covert military operation undertaken by Britain's Special Operations Executive in World War II on 9 March 1943. It involved a nighttime attack by members of the Calcutta Light Horse and the Calcutta Scottish against a German cargo ship, Ehrenfels, which had been transmitting information to U-boats from Mormugão Harbour in neutral Portugal's territory of Goa. The attack was successful, and Ehrenfels and three other Axis cargo ships were sunk, stopping the transmissions to the U-boats.

== Background ==
With the outbreak of the Second World War in 1939, three DDG Hansa cargo ships, Ehrenfels, Braunfels and Drachenfels, took refuge in the port of Mormugão in Goa. This was because Portugal was neutral in the war while British India was not. In 1940, they were joined by an Italian ship, Anfora. All British citizens aboard were allowed to disembark. The crew soon ran out of supplies, so some of them left the ships to find jobs in Goa. The British were aware of the presence of the ships but did not perceive them to be a threat as they were merchant ships.

However, in 1942 the India Mission of the Special Operations Executive (SOE) at Meerut intercepted coded messages to German Navy U-boats, relaying detailed information on the positions of Allied ships leaving Bombay in the Indian Ocean. Subsequently, in autumn of that year forty-six Allied merchant ships were attacked. The SOE then discovered that a Gestapo spy, Robert Koch (known as the "Trumpet"), and his wife Grete were living in Panaji, the capital of Goa. SOE agents Lieutenant Colonel Lewis Pugh and Colonel Stewart went to Goa in November 1942 and kidnapped the Kochs on 19 December. The couple was taken to Castle Rock, Karnataka, for questioning as part of Operation Hotspur.

The Kochs vanish from the records shortly afterwards, with conflicting reports on their ultimate fate. The SOE now suspected a secret transmitter aboard Ehrenfels was guiding German U-boat attacks against Allied shipping, on instructions from Koch. Attacks in the Indian Ocean continued, and in the first week of March 1943, German U-boats sank twelve American, UK, Norwegian, and Dutch ships, totalling about 80,000 tons.

The British could not infringe on Portugal's neutrality by openly invading its territory. The SOE decided to try a covert operation without the involvement of regular British armed forces. They recruited members of the Calcutta Light Horse 1,400 miles (2,300 km) away in Calcutta, who were on military reserve but were mainly middle-aged bankers, merchants, and solicitors. The SOE chose fourteen volunteers from the Light Horse and four more from the Calcutta Scottish for a covert operation led by Pugh: to capture or sink Ehrenfels.

== Assault ==
After being armed and trained by the SOE, some of the eighteen-member assault team embarked on a hopper barge, Phoebe, at Calcutta and sailed around India to Goa. The rest took train from Calcutta to Cochin and joined the barge and its crew there.

Around midnight of 9–10 March 1943, the town of Vasco da Gama, where Mormugão harbour is located, was celebrating the last day of Carnival. One team member used SOE funds to throw a large party in Vasco, inviting crews from all the ships in the harbour, which left only a small crew aboard Ehrenfels.

Due to a coincidence, both the lighthouse and illuminated buoy of Mormugão harbour were not working that night, allowing Phoebe to enter port in darkness. The British team attacked the Ehrenfels, killing its captain and some of the crew, and capturing the ship and its transmitter. After the ship had been captured, some of the crew of Ehrenfels scuttled the ship by opening its seacocks. The British team suffered no casualties in the operation, and left aboard Phoebe.

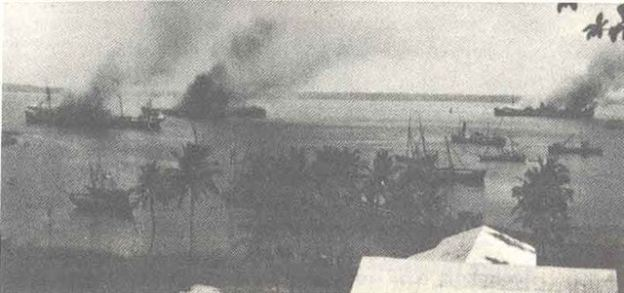
Axis ships burning in Mormugoa

The crews of the other merchant ships in the harbour, Drachenfels, Braunfels and Anfora, seeing Ehrenfels on fire and sinking, scuttled their ships to prevent their capture by the British. As Phoebe left Mormugao harbour it transmitted the codeword "Longshanks" to SOE headquarters, indicating that all Axis ships had been sunk. Ehrenfels' captain and four members of his crew were reported dead, with four more reported missing.

== Aftermath ==
After the attack, the thirteen German U-boats operating in the Indian Ocean only sank one ship, the Panamanian Nortun of 3,663 tons, throughout the rest of March. In the following month of April, they attacked only three ships.

The crews of the four scuttled ships jumped overboard and swam ashore, where the Portuguese captured them and held them in Aguada jail. Local news reported that they had mutinied. On 1 October 1943 the Judicial Court of Mormugao stated that there had been no attack by a foreign ship and convicted the crew members for the scuttling of their ships, imprisoning them until the end of the war. While in jail, they lived a good life, bribing the authorities and even roaming freely in the compound. While some infiltrated into British India and then escaped to their native countries after being set free, some of the Germans settled in Goa and started families there, facing an uncertain future in Germany.

As the attack was secret, the members of the British assault team received no official recognition of their part in the war effort. The members of the Calcutta Light Horse designed a memento for themselves: a seahorse. The Light Horse and the Calcutta Scottish were decommissioned in 1947 following the independence of India. It was only in 1974 that the British Government declassified documents of the operation.

In 1951 the wrecks of the four cargo ships were salvaged by the Mormugao Port Trust, the port at the site of the battle, with the help of one of the Germans who had chosen to remain in Goa. In 2017 the port announced that it would salvage the wrecks for scrap.

In 2002, records released from the UK National Archives revealed that three of the Axis crew members had surrendered to the British and joined the SOE's operations in India, where they worked until they were allowed to go back to their country after the war ended. The records also suggested that Operation Creek was meant to capture the Axis ships, which was prevented by their crews scuttling them.

== In popular culture ==
The world became aware of the operation only in 1978, when the story of Operation Creek was told in the book, Boarding Party, by journalist James Leasor. It was dramatised in the 1980 film The Sea Wolves starring Gregory Peck, Roger Moore and David Niven.

In the foreword of Boarding Party, Earl Mountbatten of Burma wrote:

This book tells how fourteen of them, with four colleagues from the Calcutta Scottish, another Auxiliary Force unit, volunteered for a hazardous task which, for reasons the author makes plain, no-one else was able to undertake. This happened shortly before my arrival in India in 1943, as Supreme Allied Commander, South East Asia, and immediately saw how valuable were the results of this secret operation. I am pleased that at last credit may be given to those who planned and carried it out.
