= Mario Cabral e Sá =

Indian journalist (c. 1932–2023)

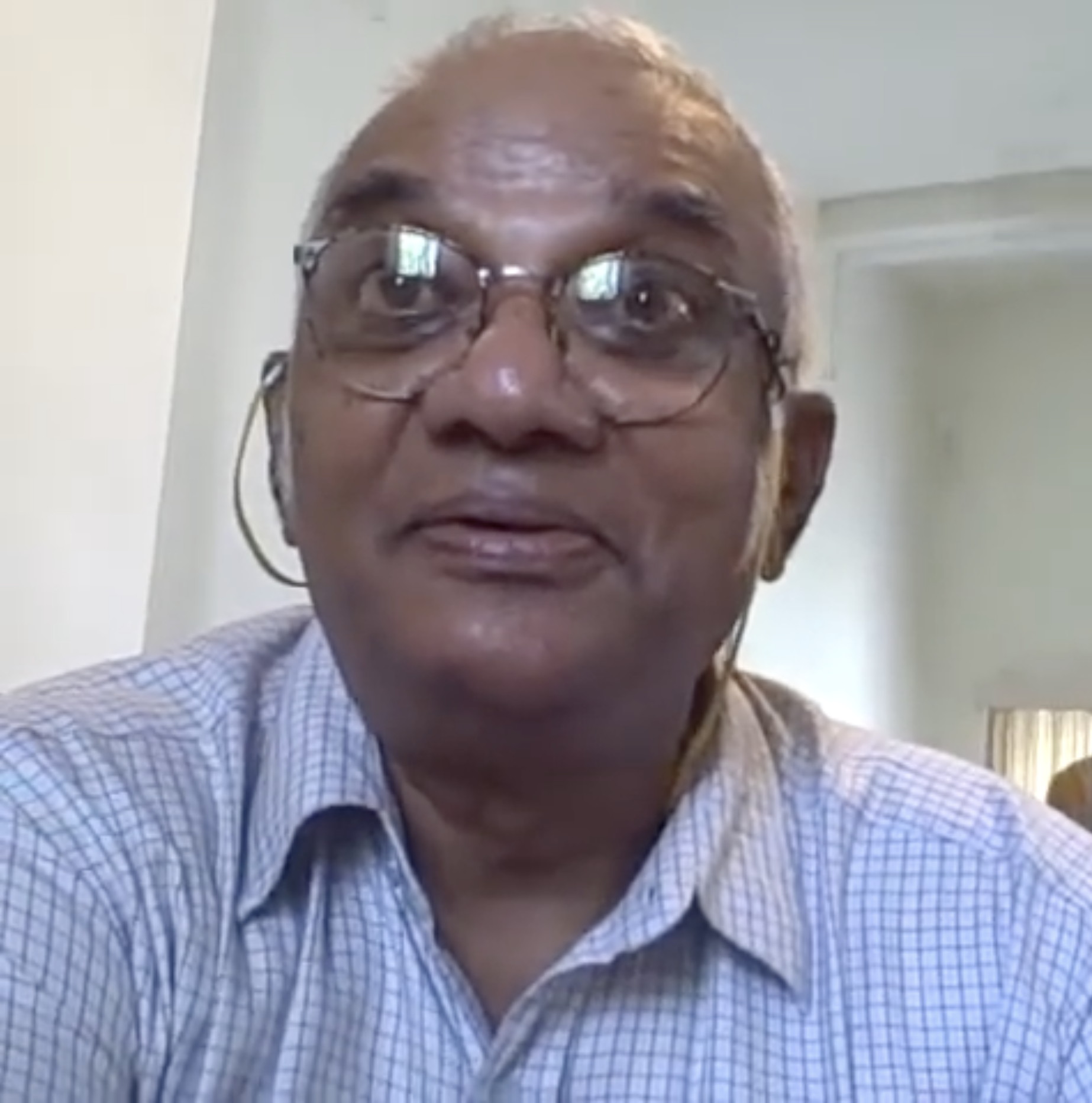
- Cabral e Sá in 2008
- Born: c. 1932; Portuguese India
- Died: 19 June 2023 (aged 91); Mumbai, Maharashtra, India
- Occupations: Journalist; writer
- Writing career
- Notable work: Goa: Pearl of the East

Mario Cabral e Sá (c. 1932 – 19 June 2023) was an Indian journalist and writer.

== Career ==
Cabral e Sa worked as a journalist and author. Beyond his writing, he was known for his role as a mentor to other professionals in the field.

Cabral e Sa was the Goa unit manager during the production of the 1980 war film The Sea Wolves.

== Works ==
Cabral e Sa wrote several books during his career. His notable works include Konkannama, Goa, three volumes of Great Goans, Legends of Goa and Goa: Pearl of the East.

== Death ==
Mario Cabral e Sa died on 19 June 2023 at the age of 91 in Mumbai. He was cremated. His ashes were interred in the cemetery at Divar.
