= Richard Frisby =

British Army general (1911–1982)

Major-General Richard Frisby CB CBE DSO MC
- Born: 1911
- Died: 1982 (aged 70−71)
- Military career
- Allegiance: United Kingdom
- Branch: British Army
- Service years: 1931−1965
- Rank: Major-General
- Service number: 52626
- Unit: Hampshire Regiment
- Commands: 4th Battalion, Welch Regiment; 1st Battalion, Royal Hampshire Regiment; 14th Battalion, Parachute Regiment; 1st Battalion, Royal Hampshire Regiment; Tactical Wing of the School of Infantry; Commonwealth Brigade Group; 24th Infantry Brigade; 53rd (Welsh) Infantry Division
- Conflicts: Second World War
- Awards: Companion of the Order of the Bath; Commander of the Order of the British Empire; Distinguished Service Order; Military Cross

Major-General Richard George Fellowes Frisby, CB, CBE, DSO, MC (1911–1982) was a British Army officer.

== Military career ==
Educated at Haileybury and the Royal Military College, Sandhurst, Frisby was commissioned into the Hampshire Regiment on 27 August 1931. He served in Palestine in the late 1930s for which he was awarded the Military Cross.

He served as commanding officer of the 4th Battalion the Welch Regiment in North West Europe from 1944 to 1945 during the Second World War.

After the war, he served as commanding officer of the 1st Battalion, the Royal Hampshire Regiment from 1945 to 1946, commanding officer of 14th Battalion the Parachute Regiment from 1949 to 1951 and then commanding officer of the Royal Hampshire Regiment again from 1951 to 1953. He went on to become commander of the Tactical Wing of the School of Infantry in 1953, commander of the Commonwealth Brigade Group in Korea in 1955 and commander of 24th Infantry Brigade in January 1957. After that he became brigadier on the general staff at Eastern Command in May 1959, General Officer Commanding the 53rd (Welsh) Infantry Division in February 1961 and Chief of Staff at Allied Forces Northern Europe in December 1963 before retiring in December 1965.

He was appointed a Deputy lieutenant of Hampshire in April 1981.

== Family ==
In 1938 he married Elizabeth Mary Murray; they had two sons.

Military offices
| Preceded by Lewis Pugh | GOC 53rd (Welsh) Infantry Division; 1961–1963 | Succeeded by Douglas Darling |
