= Marble Palace (Kolkata) =

Coordinates: 22.582378°N 88.360143°E

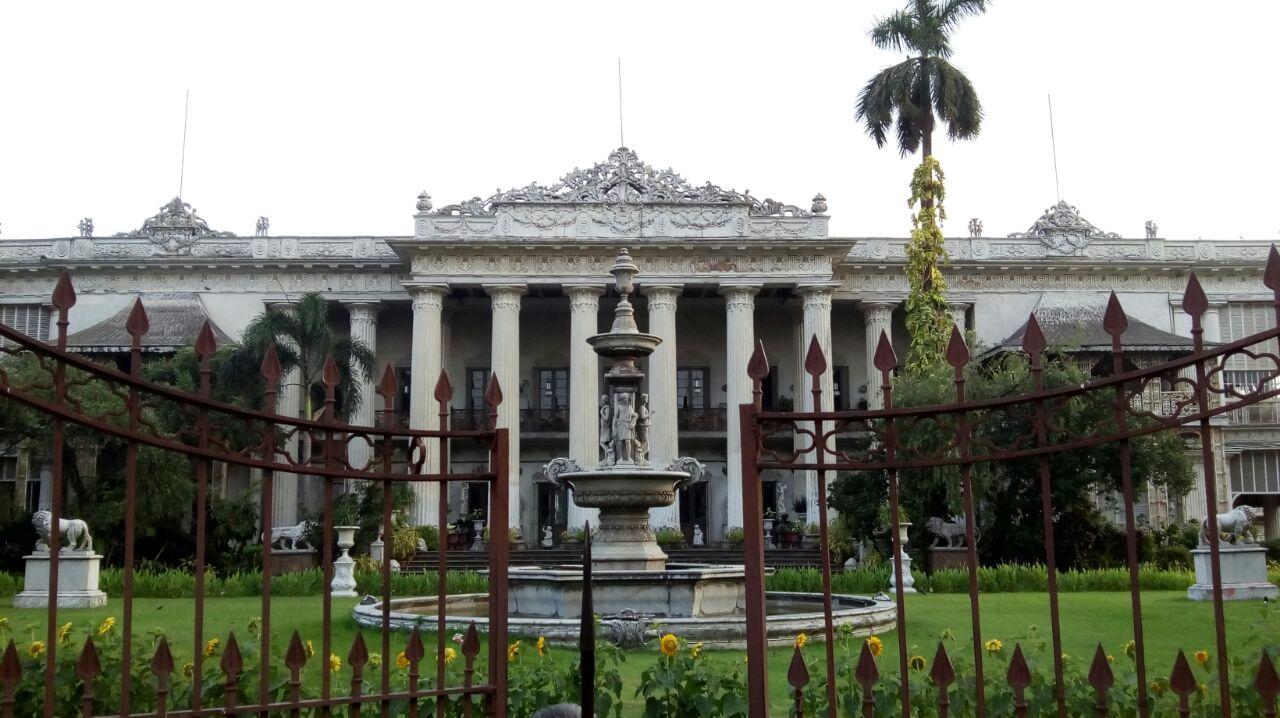
- Façade of the Marble Palace (Kolkata)
- Interactive map of the Marble Palace area

General information
- Architectural style: Neoclassical
- Location: Kolkata, West Bengal, India
- Completed: c. 1835 (opened)
- Owner: Descendants of Raja Rajendra Mullick

Marble Palace is a palatial nineteenth-century mansion in North Kolkata. It is located at 46, Muktaram Babu Street, Kolkata 700007. It is one of the best-preserved and most elegant houses of nineteenth-century Calcutta. The mansion is famous for its marble walls, floors, and sculptures, from which it derives its name.

== History of Marble Palace ==
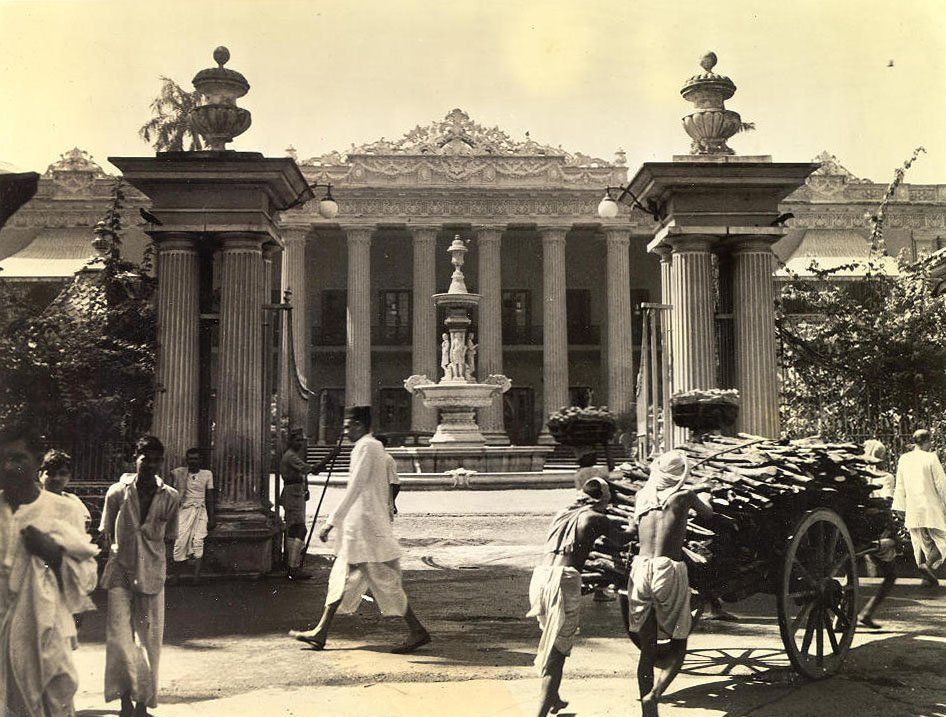
The Marble Palace in 1945

The house was built in 1835 by Raja Rajendra Mullick, a wealthy Bengali merchant with a passion for collecting works of art. The house continues to be a residence for his descendants, and the current occupants are the family of Raja Rajendra Mullick Bahadur. Raja Rajendra Mullick was the adopted son of Nilmoni Mullick, who built a Jagannath temple which predates Marble Palace, and still stands within the premises, but is only accessible to members of the family.

== Architecture ==
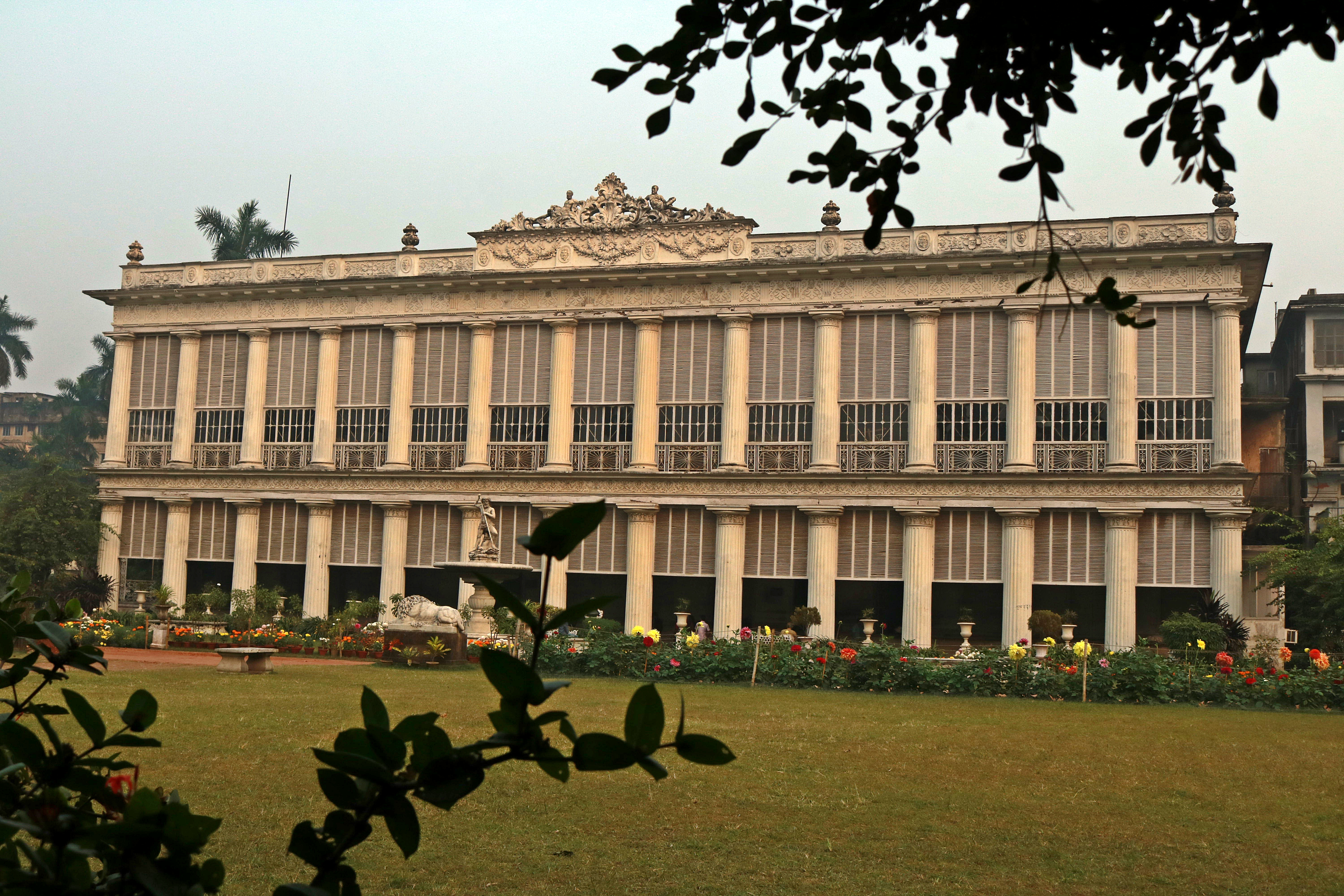
Buildings of Marble Palace

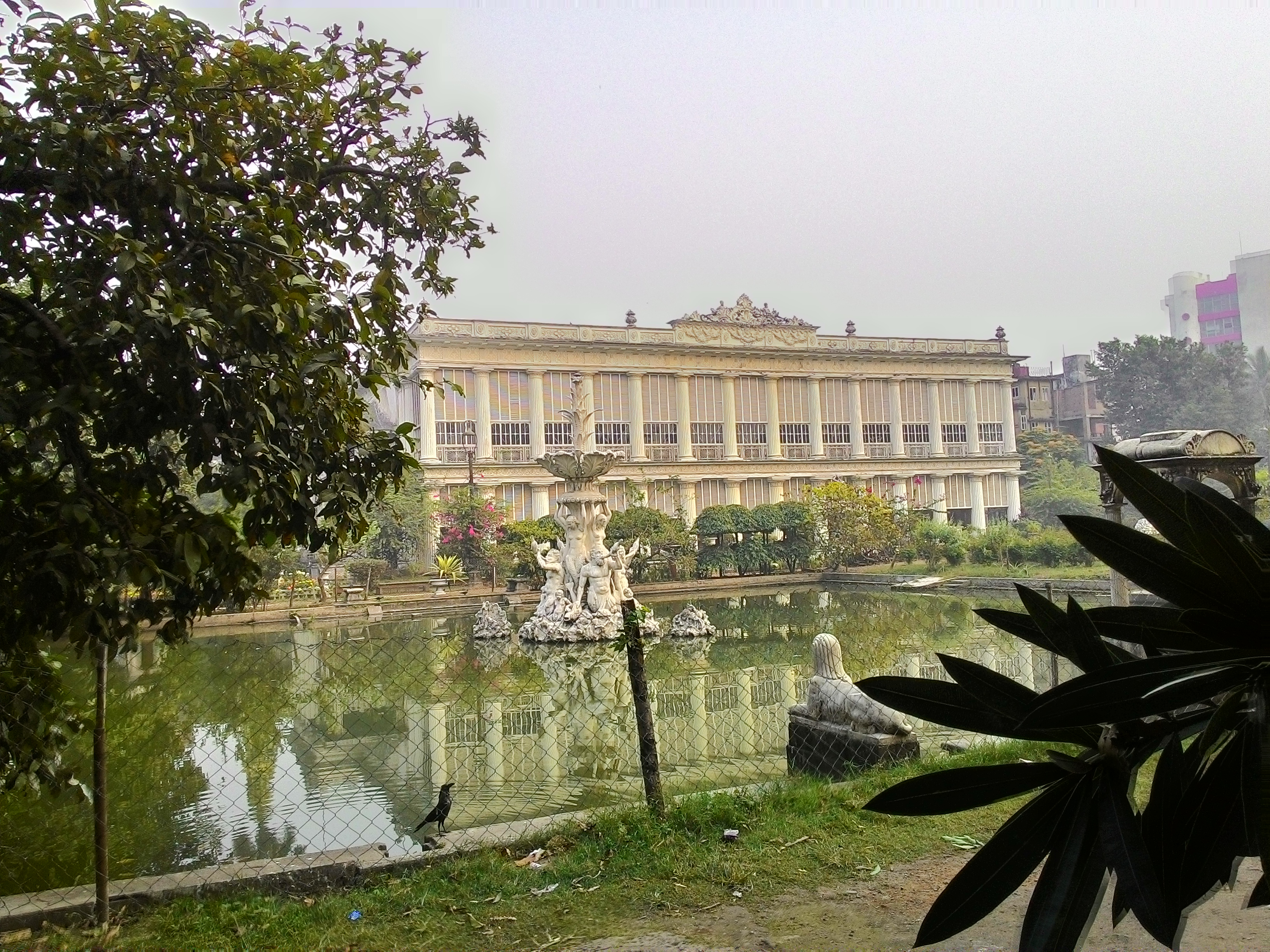
Buildings of Marble Palace

The house is Neoclassical in style, while the plan with its open courtyards is largely traditional Bengali. Adjacent to the courtyard, there is a thakur-dalan, or place of worship for members of the family. The three-story building has tall fluted Corinthian pillars and ornamented verandas with fretwork and sloping roofs, built in the style of a Chinese pavilion. The premises also include a garden with lawns, a rock garden, a lake and a small zoo.

== Collections ==
Marble Palace houses many Western sculptures, pieces of Victorian furniture, paintings by European and Indian artists, and other artifacts. Decorative objects include large chandeliers, clocks, floor to ceiling mirrors, urns, and royal busts. The house contains two paintings by Peter Paul Rubens, The Marriage of St. Catherine and The Martyrdom of St. Sebastian. There are also said to be two paintings by Sir Joshua Reynolds, The Infant Hercules Strangling the Serpent and Venus and Cupid. Other artists said to figure in the collections include Titian, Bartolomé Esteban Murillo, and John Opie.

The collection of artifacts is lavish but random; genuinely valuable pieces of art share space with a lot of kitschy art objects of little value. This has caused some to feel the collection is superficial and gaudy. Geoffrey Moorhouse in his book Calcutta says it looks "as if they had been scavenged from job lots on the Portobello Road on a series of damp Saturday afternoons."

== Appearances in fiction ==
The final scene of the French novel Le vol des cigognes de Jean-Christophe Grangé takes place in the Marble Palace.

== Access ==
Because Marble Palace remains a private residence, photography is prohibited. Entry is free, and no permit is required for entry, now. Inside the house, there are guides who give visitors a tour of the house, although the parts of the house which are still inhabited remain off-limits. Marble Palace is open from 10am to 4pm on all days except Mondays and Thursdays.

== Bibliography ==
- Chatterjee, Dinabandhu. "A Short Sketch of Rajah Rajendro Mullick Bahadur and His Family", Calcutta: Calcutta Print Works, 1917.
