= James Leasor =

English novelist (1923–2007)

- Born: 20 December 1923; Erith, Kent, England
- Died: 10 September 2007 (aged 83); Wiltshire, England
- Occupation: Author
- Writing career
- Pen name: James Leasor; Andrew MacAllan
- Period: 1946–1997
- Genres: Fiction, History
- Website: www.jamesleasor.com

James Leasor (20 December 1923 – 10 September 2007) was a prolific British writer of historical books and thrillers. He was one of the best-selling British authors of the 20th century. After beginning his writing career as a journalist he wrote more than 50 books, some of which were made into films, including his 1978 historical novel Boarding Party, the story of a secret incident from the Second World War, which became The Sea Wolves (1980) starring Gregory Peck, Roger Moore and David Niven.

== Biography ==
Thomas James Leasor was born on 20 December 1923 in Erith, Kent, the younger of two children of Richard Leasor and Christina Hall. His father was from Lancashire and his mother was Scottish. He was educated at the City of London School and studied medicine for a short time after leaving school before being employed in 1941-42 as a reporter on the Kentish Times.

=== Army career ===
Early in World War 2, as soon as he was old enough, Leasor enlisted in the Buffs (Royal East Kent Regiment). He was commissioned into the Royal Berkshire Regiment and volunteered for service in the Far East, where he served in Burma with the Lincolnshire Regiment during World War II. Whilst serving with the Lincolns he saw action in the Battle of the Admin Box. In the Far East, whilst sailing in convoy HC-44 from Calcutta to Chittagong, his troopship, the El Madina, was torpedoed on 16 March 1944 Ten crew, six gunners and 364 troops died and Leasor spent 18 hours adrift in the Indian Ocean. He was wounded in action (injuries from a shell) on 8 May 1944 in the Arakan, and treated at 25 Indian Casualty Clearing Station.

He later returned to Burma as an Army Observer for the 12th Army, at that time in Rangoon. In February 1946 he was transferred to HQ Malaya Command in Kuala Lumpur. During his time as an observer he travelled throughout Burma, Malaya, the Shan States and the Andaman Islands by plane and jeep. He reckoned that he had visited practically every town in these regions by the time he returned to the UK in mid-1946. His novel, NTR: Nothing to Report (1955), was a semi-autobiographical account of some of his experiences in India and Burma during the war.

=== Journalism and publishing ===
During the war Leasor wrote over 300 news stories on the Burma campaign, and also contributed features for the BBC and All India Radio as well as for virtually every British national newspaper. In November 1944 he left Burma to become a sub-editor of Contact, a bi-weekly newspaper for the forces of India Command in Delhi and South East Asia Command, under the editorship of Frank Owen.

After the war Leasor went to Oriel College, Oxford, where he read English, edited The Isis and wrote articles for The Wide World magazine. He joined the Daily Express in 1948 and became private secretary to the proprietor, Lord Beaverbrook. One of his first tasks was to help Beaverbrook to write a book, which was published as “The Three Keys to Success”. In his seven years at the Express, from 1948 to 1955, Leasor worked as a reporter, as columnist William Hickey, as a feature writer and as a foreign correspondent.

From 1955 to 1969 he was an editorial adviser and consultant for London publishers George Newnes and C. Arthur Pearson. From 1970 to 1973 he was a Director of Elm Tree Books Ltd, London. In 1971 he wrote the book of the comic off-Broadway musical Look Where I'm At!

=== Published works ===
Leasor wrote his first book, a comedy titled Not Such a Bad Day, in 1946, by hand in the jungles of Burma on airgraphs, single sheets of light-sensitive paper, which were reduced to the size of microdots and sent to England in instalments to be enlarged to full size. His mother typed the manuscript and sent it to an agent, who found a publisher in Leicester. The book sold 28,000 copies, although Leasor received only £50 for its rights.

He was first noticed as an author after writing a number of critically acclaimed histories, including The Red Fort (1956), his account of the Indian Mutiny, about which Cecil Woodham-Smith commented in the New York Times: "Never has this story of hate, violence, courage and cowardice been better told"; The One That Got Away (1956), the story of the only German prisoner of war, Franz von Werra, to escape from Allied territory during World War 2, which was later made into a film starring Hardy Kruger; The Plague and the Fire (1961), about London's twin disasters in the 17th century; The Millionth Chance (1957) about the loss of the R101 airship; and Singapore: The Battle that Changed the World (1968), on the Battle of Singapore in 1942.

Leasor became a full-time author in the 1960s after the success of his novel Passport to Oblivion (1964), a thriller featuring Dr Jason Love, which became one of the best selling books of the decade and was filmed as Where the Spies Are (1965) starring David Niven. An audio version of Passport to Oblivion was released in 2019 starring George Lazenby as Dr Jason Love. He wrote nine more thrillers featuring Jason Love, as well a string of other novels.

He continued to write historical books: later titles included Green Beach (1975) about the Dieppe Raid of 1942 and a secret operation to capture German radar equipment; Boarding Party (1978), based on the real events of Operation Creek in 1943, which was filmed as The Sea Wolves (1980); The Unknown Warrior (1980) about an agent who was a major part of the D-Day deception plans; and Who Killed Sir Harry Oakes? (1983), which was made into a TV mini-series in 1989 called Passion and Paradise, starring Armand Assante, Catherine Mary Stewart, Mariette Hartley and Kevin McCarthy, with Rod Steiger playing Sir Harry Oakes. His final history was Rhodes and Barnato (1997), which examined the lives of two men, Cecil Rhodes and Barney Barnato, who were major figures in the history of South Africa.

Leasor wrote six books under the pseudonym Andrew MacAllan, and ghosted 'autobiographies' for people as diverse as King Zog of Albania—who made him a member of the Order of St John of Jerusalem—and British actors Kenneth More and Jack Hawkins. He was the guiding hand behind the memoirs of the Duke of Windsor.

=== Private life and death ===
Leasor had a great interest in cars and owned pre-war specimens such as a rare Cord roadster, which he made use of in the Jason Love novels, and an SS Jaguar 100 which featured in his Aristo Autos series.

He married barrister Joan Bevan on 1 December 1951 and they had three sons. He lived for his last 40 years at Swallowcliffe Manor, near Salisbury in Wiltshire.

James Leasor died in Salisbury on 10 September 2007, aged 83, and is buried in the churchyard of St. Peter's Church in Swallowcliffe.

== Andrew MacAllan ==
In his later career Leasor was finding it harder to interest publishers in new book projects. They were happy to publish some of his proven successes, such as the Jason Love thrillers, but they would limit their print runs to 20,000 in hardback, most of which would be acquired by libraries, and he would then be told that few had been sold to retailers and that there was no popular demand for a larger run.

He was also frustrated by people accosting him at drinks parties and saying it was virtually impossible for a new author to be published on merit alone, without a fashionable backstory to excite the publisher's interest. Leasor and his literary agent, Gillon Aitken, thought of a way for a supposed new author to have a book published without revealing who he was. Their idea involved an author who had a credible reason for being unable to meet the publisher. The narrative was developed that a successful businessman, 'Andrew MacAllan', was based in the Far East and because of the nature of his work, travelled frequently. He would be hard to tie to any particular location or schedule, and all contact would be made through the agent.

Leasor wrote the first three chapters and a synopsis of an epic historical saga, loosely based on the origins of Hong Kong-based trading companies like Jardine Matheson and Swire, and Gillon Aitken took it with the agreed story about MacAllan around London-based publishers. It was snapped up by the fairly recently launched – and very ambitious – Headline Publishing Group, with a healthy advance.

During his travels around the world, Leasor had collected hotel-headed writing paper from various places, and 'MacAllan' used these to correspond with the publisher. With the co-operation of a bank manager, he opened an account in London in the name of Andrew MacAllan, so that any royalty payments could be made without arousing suspicion. The bank could also act as a forwarding address.

The first book, Succession, a 700-page blockbuster, was published in 1989 and sold well. An initial print run of 50,000 in hardback quickly sold out and reprints swiftly followed, making it Headline's biggest seller that year. A sequel, Generation, came out the following year, and was similarly successful.

The pressure from the publishers to meet their star author became overwhelming. Who was this unknown writer who could so effortlessly turn out bestsellers with supposedly no previous experience? Numerous meetings had been scheduled and then cancelled at short notice because of MacAllan's supposed hectic travel schedule. Aitken and Leasor realised that this could not go on for ever and they revealed the deception. Headline, now part of the Hachette publishing group, published four more MacAllan bestsellers, Diamond Hard (1991), Fanfare (1992), Speculator (1993), and Traders (1994).

== Bibliography ==
=== Jason Love novels ===
- Leasor, J. (1964). Passport to Oblivion. London: Heinemann. OCLC 11919382. Archived from the original on 19 April 2012.
- Leasor, J. (1966). Passport to Peril. London: Heinemann. ISBN 9780552105866. OCLC 3505645. Archived from the original on 19 April 2012. Published in the U.S. as Leasor, J. (1966). Spylight. Philadelphia: Lippincott. OCLC 1378217.
- Leasor, J. (1967). Passport in Suspense. London: Heinemann. OCLC 28535433. Archived from the original on 3 November 2015. Published in the U.S. as Leasor, J. (1967). The Yang Meridian. New York: Putnam. OCLC 408333.
- Leasor, J. (1968). Passport for a Pilgrim. London: Heinemann. ISBN 0-434-41013-6. OCLC 41039. Archived from the original on 3 November 2015.
- Leasor, J. (1969). A Week of Love : Being Seven Adventures of Dr. Jason Love. London: Heinemann. ISBN 0-434-41014-4. OCLC 59215589. Archived from the original on 14 August 2020.
- Leasor, J. (1971). Love-all. London: Heinemann. ISBN 0-434-41017-9. OCLC 16196092. Archived from the original on 14 August 2020.
- Leasor, J. (1979). Love and the Land Beyond. London: Heinemann. ISBN 0-434-41027-6. OCLC 63827505. Archived from the original on 14 August 2020.
- Leasor, J. (1989). Frozen Assets. London: Grafton. ISBN 0-246-13310-4. OCLC 19671462. Archived from the original on 14 August 2020.
- Leasor, J. (1992). Love Down Under. London: HarperCollins. ISBN 0-246-13713-4. OCLC 26358996. Archived from the original on 25 September 2020.

=== Jason Love and Aristo Autos novel ===
- Leasor, J. (1973). Host of Extras. London: Heinemann. ISBN 0-434-41020-9. OCLC 667816.

=== Aristo Autos novels ===
- Leasor, J. (1969). They Don't Make Them Like That Any More. London: Heinemann. OCLC 78482. Archived from the original on 19 July 2012.
- Leasor, J. (1970). Never Had a Spanner on Her. London: Heinemann. OCLC 29647906. Archived from the original on 19 April 2012.

=== Robert Gunn novels ===
- Leasor, J. (1973). Mandarin-Gold. London: Heinemann. ISBN 0-434-41022-5. OCLC 806328. Archived from the original on 20 July 2012.
- Leasor, J. (1975). The Chinese Widow. London: Heinemann. ISBN 0-434-41023-3. OCLC 2074606. Archived from the original on 3 November 2015.
- Leasor, J. (1976). Jade Gate. London: Heinemann. ISBN 0-434-41025-X. OCLC 2646806. Archived from the original on 3 November 2015.

=== Other novels ===
- Leasor, J. (1946). Not Such a Bad Day.
- Leasor, J. (1951). The Strong Delusion. London: Harrap. OCLC 1872596.
- Leasor, J. (1955). NTR : Nothing to Report. London: Werner Laurie. OCLC 14350159. Archived from the original on 19 April 2012.
- Leasor, J. (1972). Follow the Drum. London: Heinemann. ISBN 0-434-41019-5. Archived from the original on 31 March 2012.
- Leasor, J. (1982). Open Secret. London: Collins. ISBN 0-00-222336-8. OCLC 10057404. Archived from the original on 20 July 2012.
- Leasor, J. (1984). Ship of Gold. London: Collins. ISBN 0-00-222797-5. OCLC 12502794. Archived from the original on 14 August 2020.
- Leasor, J. (1986). Tank of Serpents. London: Collins. ISBN 0-00-222915-3. OCLC 13158926. Archived from the original on 14 August 2020.

=== As Andrew MacAllan (novels) ===
- MacAllan, A. (1989). Succession. London: Headline. ISBN 0-7472-0094-7. OCLC 18321969. Archived from the original on 25 September 2020.
- MacAllan, A. (1990). Generation. London: Headline. ISBN 0-7472-0116-1. OCLC 20564160. Archived from the original on 14 August 2020.
- MacAllan, A. (1991). Diamond Hard. London: Headline. ISBN 0-7472-0346-6. OCLC 22623910.
- MacAllan, A. (1992). Fanfare. London: Headline. ISBN 0-7472-0476-4. OCLC 26357827.
- MacAllan, A. (1993). Speculator. London: Headline. ISBN 0-7472-0731-3. OCLC 29222039.
- MacAllan, A. (1994). Traders. London: Headline. ISBN 0-7472-0995-2. OCLC 30778975.

=== Short stories ===
- Leasor, J. At Rest at Last first published in The Rigby File (1989), ed. Tim Heald

=== Non-fiction ===
- Leasor, J. (1951). The Monday Story. Oxford University Press. OCLC 30190895.
- Leasor, J. (1952). Author by Profession. London: Cleaver-Hume Press. OCLC 1925903.
- Leasor, J. (1954). Wheels to Fortune; a brief account of the life and times of William Morris, Viscount Nuffield. London: The Bodley Head. OCLC 14118317. Archived from the original on 31 March 2012.
- Leasor, J. (1955). The Serjeant-major; a biography of R.S.M. Ronald Brittain, M.B.E., Coldstream Guards. London: Harrap. OCLC 2154501. Archived from the original on 26 June 2018.
- Leasor, J. (1956). The Red Fort; an account of the Siege of Delhi in 1857. London: W. Laurie. OCLC 2514152. Archived from the original on 1 February 2020.
- Burt, K.; Leasor, J. (1956). The One That Got Away. London: Collins. OCLC 2071959. Archived from the original on 28 January 2013.
- Leasor, J. (1957). The Millionth Chance: The Story of the R.101. London: H. Hamilton. OCLC 2216706.
- Leasor, J.; Hollis, L. (1959). War at the Top; based on the experiences of General Sir Leslie Hollis. London: Michael Joseph. OCLC 385375. Archived from the original on 28 January 2013.
- Eton, P.; Leasor, J. (1960). Wall of Silence. Indianapolis: Bobbs-Merrill. ISBN 0-434-41019-5. OCLC 1609399.
- Leasor, J. (1961). The Plague and the Fire. New York: McGraw-Hill. OCLC 6683903. Archived from the original on 3 April 2016.
- Leasor, J. (1962). Rudolf Hess : The Uninvited Envoy. London: Allen & Unwin. OCLC 1373664. Archived from the original on 28 January 2013.
- Leasor, J. (1968). Singapore: The Battle that Changed the World. London: Hodder & Stoughton. ISBN 0-340-04434-9. OCLC 23377403. Archived from the original on 28 January 2013.
- Leasor, J. (1975). Green Beach. London: Heinemann. ISBN 0-434-41024-1. OCLC 1354236. Archived from the original on 26 November 2011.
- Leasor, J. (1978). Boarding Party. London: Heinemann. ISBN 0-434-41026-8. OCLC 4191743. Archived from the original on 7 August 2020. Republished in paperback 1980 as The Sea Wolves with a special foreword by Lord Mountbatten of Burma.
- Leasor, J. (1980). The Unknown Warrior. London: Heinemann. OCLC 6869173. Archived from the original on 28 January 2013. Republished in paperback as Leasor, J. (1980). X-Troop. London: Heinemann. OCLC 16603611.
- Leasor, J. (1983). Who Killed Sir Harry Oakes?. London: Heinemann. ISBN 0-434-41029-2. OCLC 10520894. Archived from the original on 31 March 2012.
- Leasor, J. (1988). The Marine from Mandalay. London: Leo Cooper. OCLC 29637493. Archived from the original on 31 March 2012.
- Leasor, J. (1997). Rhodes & Barnato : The Premier and the Prancer. London: Leo Cooper. ISBN 0-85052-545-4. OCLC 37321005. Archived from the original on 27 November 2020.

== See also ==
- Calcutta Light Horse
- List of films based on war books
