= The Sea Wolves =

1980 war film

- Original film poster by Arnaldo Putzu
- Directed by: Andrew V. McLaglen
- Screenplay by: Reginald Rose
- Based on: Boarding Party; 1978 book by James Leasor
- Produced by: Euan Lloyd
- Starring: Gregory Peck; Roger Moore; David Niven; Trevor Howard; Barbara Kellerman; Patrick Macnee
- Cinematography: Tony Imi
- Music by: Roy Budd
- Production companies: Lorimar Productions; Richmond Light Horse Productions; Varius Entertainment Trading A.G.
- Distributed by: Rank Film Distributors; Paramount Pictures; Elite Films (Switzerland)
- Release dates: 3 July 1980 (London); 22 August 1980 (Switzerland)
- Running time: 121 minutes
- Countries: United Kingdom; United States; Switzerland
- Language: English
- Budget: $12 million
- Box office: $220,181 (USA)

The Sea Wolves is a 1980 war film starring Gregory Peck, Roger Moore and David Niven. The film, which is based on the 1978 book Boarding Party by James Leasor, is the true story of Operation Creek during the Second World War. In the covert mission, the Calcutta Light Horse, part of the Cavalry Reserve in the British Indian Army, successfully sank a German merchant ship in Mormugão Harbour in neutral Portugal's territory of Goa, India, on 9 March 1943. The ship had a secret radio which was transmitting information about Allied shipping to U-boats operating in the Indian Ocean.

The film, which starred veteran American and British actors, was produced by Euan Lloyd and directed by Andrew V. McLaglen; both had previously worked together on the successful 1978 British-Swiss war film The Wild Geese.

== Plot ==
During World War II, German U-boats are sinking thousands of tons of British merchant shipping in the Indian Ocean. British intelligence, based in India, believes that information is being passed to the U-boats by a radio transmitter hidden on board one of three German merchant ships interned in Goa, then a colony of Portugal. Since Portugal is neutral, the ships cannot be attacked by conventional forces.

The head of the Indian section of the Special Operations Executive (SOE) authorises attempts to kidnap and interrogate two known German agents, but these operations both fail. An approach is then made to a Territorial unit of British expatriates, the Calcutta Light Horse, to carry out the mission on its behalf. They all volunteer – all are trained in military skills and keen to 'do their bit'.

Whilst the volunteers are trained, Stewart and Cartwright travel covertly to Goa. By a mixture of blackmail and bribery, they arrange diversions on the night of the raid. A party is to be held in the Governor's palace, a brothel will offer free entry to sailors from ships in the port and a Carnival with fireworks will be held. Stewart has a brief affair with Mrs. Agnes Cromwell, a mysterious and socially well-connected woman, who turns out to be a German agent and the main conduit to the German 'Master Spy', known to the Germans and the British by the code-name Trompeta (Trumpet). She is eventually killed by Stewart after she attempts to kill him but not before she has killed Jack Cartwright.

The raiding party sail around the coast in a decrepit and barely seaworthy barge; they set limpet mines on the hull of the German ships in Goa. They then board one which is being used to transmit signals to U-boats, catching the depleted crew off-guard. Despite Pugh's order that there be no shooting, several German sailors are killed. The ship is set alight and the party withdraws, watching as the ship sinks. The final scene shows a surfacing German U-boat which is expecting to hear a signal from the now sunken ship.

=== Differences from actual raid ===
See Operation Creek

While certain elements are faithful to the real-life raid, in reality the ships were not blown up by limpet mines but scuttled by their own crew. It is widely believed the intention was the capture of the ships rather than their destruction. Only four German crew died, with the rest swimming ashore.

The German spy known as Trumpet was in reality not a single person but a couple. Captured by Pugh and Stewart, they were interrogated by British Intelligence but all trace of them was removed from the records and their fate is unknown.

== Cast ==
- Gregory Peck as Lieutenant-Colonel Lewis Henry Owain Pugh, Royal Artillery (who later rose to the rank of major-general)
- Roger Moore as Captain Gavin Stewart (the real Gavin Stewart was a colonel)
- David Niven as Colonel W.H. Grice
- Trevor Howard as Jack Cartwright
- Barbara Kellerman as Mrs. Agnes Cromwell
- Patrick Macnee as Major 'Yogi' Crossley
- Kenneth Griffith as Wilton
- Patrick Allen as Colin Mackenzie
- Wolf Kahler as Trompeta
- Robert Hoffmann as U-boat Kapitän
- Dan van Husen as U-boat First Officer
- George Mikell as Kapitän of Ehrenfels
- Jürgen Andersen as First Officer of Ehrenfels
- Bernard Archard as Underhill
- Martin Benson as Mr. Montero
- Faith Brook as Mrs. Doris Grice
- Allan Cuthbertson as Dickie Melborne
- Edward Dentith as Lumsdaine
- Clifford Earl as Sloane
- Vice Admiral RKS Ghandhi as the Governor
- Percy Herbert as Dennison
- Patrick Holt as Barker
- Donald Houston as Hilliard
- Glyn Houston as Peters
- Victor Langley as Williamson
- Terence Longdon as Malverne
- Michael Medwin as Radcliffe
- W. Morgan Sheppard as 'Patch' Lovecroft
- John Standing as Finley
- Graham Stark as Don Manners
- Keith Stevenson as Manuel
- Jack Watson as Maclean
- Moray Watson as Breene
- Brook Williams as Butterworth
- Marc Zuber as Ram Das Gupta
- Mohan Agashe as the Brothel Keeper

== Production ==
=== Development ===
The film was originally known as Boarding Party, the title of the book it is based on by James Leasor. According to the documentary The Last of the Gentleman Producers, producer Euan Lloyd says that he originally planned to reunite Roger Moore with The Wild Geese co-stars Richard Burton and Richard Harris as Lewis Pugh and W.H. Grice.

Fifty percent of the budget was provided by Lorimar. They fell out with United Artists, their distributor, before the film was delivered. Lorimar subsequently formed a new relationship with Paramount but producer Lloyd thought that studio regarded the film as "the poor cousin" and as a result it "wasn't sold properly". Part of the finance came from The Rank Organisation.

=== Casting ===
The film reunited much of the cast and crew from 1978's The Wild Geese, including actors Roger Moore, Kenneth Griffith, Jack Watson, Percy Herbert, Patrick Allen, Brook Williams, Patrick Holt and Terence Longdon, writer Reginald Rose, producer Euan Lloyd, director Andrew V. McLaglen, designer Syd Cain and composer Roy Budd.

=== Filming ===
Filming took place on location in Goa, India. The Goa unit manager was the noted local journalist Mario Cabral e Sá, while Goan cartoonist Mario Miranda was the creative assistant.

== Soundtrack ==
The title music for The Sea Wolves was adapted by Roy Budd from the famous Warsaw Concerto of composer Richard Addinsell. Budd had, at the time, already composed or arranged numerous other film scores, notably those of The Wild Geese and Get Carter. For The Sea Wolves, Budd added lyrics by Leslie Bricusse to his arrangement of the Warsaw Concerto music, the resulting song being entitled "The Precious Moments", sung by the British baritone Matt Monro, who had also sung title tracks for many other films.

== Release ==
The film had its world premiere on 3 July 1980 at the Leicester Square Theatre in London before opening to the public the following day there and at the Odeon Marble Arch.

== Reception ==
Film critic Robert Roten gave the film a "C+," and described it as "a workmanlike film told in a non-flashy, straightforward way, featuring an all-star cast."
