= George Lazenby =

Australian retired actor (born 1939)

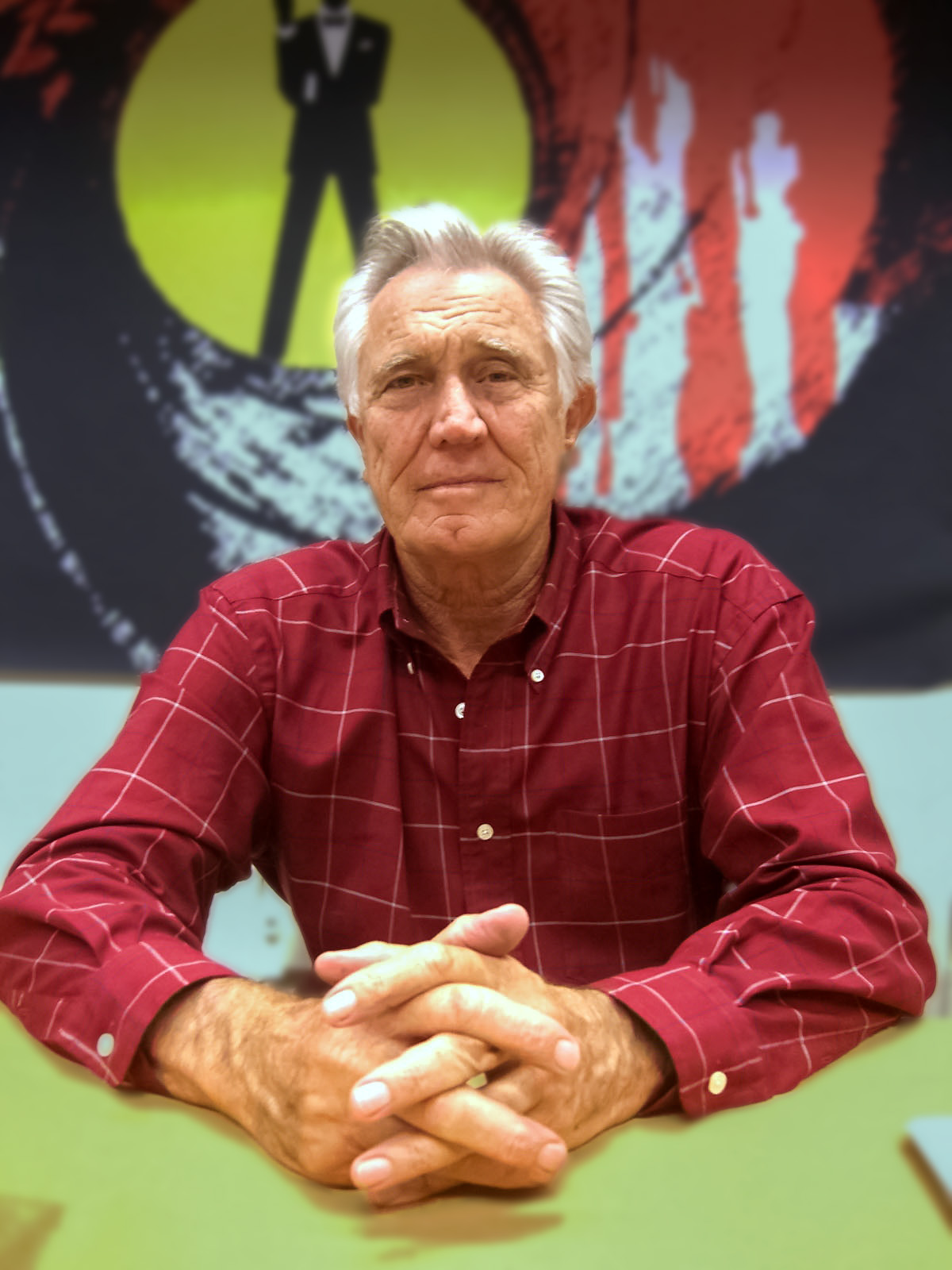
- Lazenby at the 2008 Big Apple Comic Con
- Born: George Robert Lazenby; 5 September 1939 (age 87); Goulburn, New South Wales, Australia
- Occupation: Actor
- Years active: 1963–2024
- Known for: James Bond in On Her Majesty's Secret Service
- Spouses: Chrissie Townson (m. 1973; div. 1995); Pam Shriver (m. 2002; div. 2011)
- Children: 6 (1 deceased)

George Robert Lazenby (/ˈleɪzənbi/; born 5 September 1939) is a retired Australian actor. He began his career as a model and an actor in commercials. He had no film acting experience when he was cast as the fictional British secret agent James Bond for the film On Her Majesty's Secret Service (1969). Lazenby replaced the original Bond actor, Sean Connery, but declined to return for subsequent films in the series, instead pursuing roles in Universal Soldier (1971), Who Saw Her Die? (1972), The Shrine of Ultimate Bliss (1974), and The Man from Hong Kong (1975).

== Early life ==
George Robert Lazenby was born on 5 September 1939, in Goulburn, New South Wales, at Ovada Private Hospital, to railway worker George Edward Lazenby and Fosseys retail worker Sheila Joan Lazenby (née Bodel). He attended Goulburn Public School in his primary years and Goulburn High School until 1954. His sister Barbara was an accomplished dancer. When he was young, he spent 18 months in hospital after he underwent an operation that left him with only half a kidney.

When Lazenby was about 14, he moved with his family from Goulburn to Queanbeyan, where his father ran a store. He served in the Australian Army, then afterwards worked as a car salesman and mechanic.

=== Early jobs and modelling ===
Lazenby moved to London in 1964 to pursue a woman with whom he had fallen in love. He became a car salesman in Finchley, where he was spotted by a talent scout who persuaded him to become a model. He was soon earning £25,000 a year (equivalent to £442,734 in 2025). He was widely known for appearing in an advertisement for Fry's chocolate bars. In 1966, he was voted Top Model of the Year.

== James Bond ==
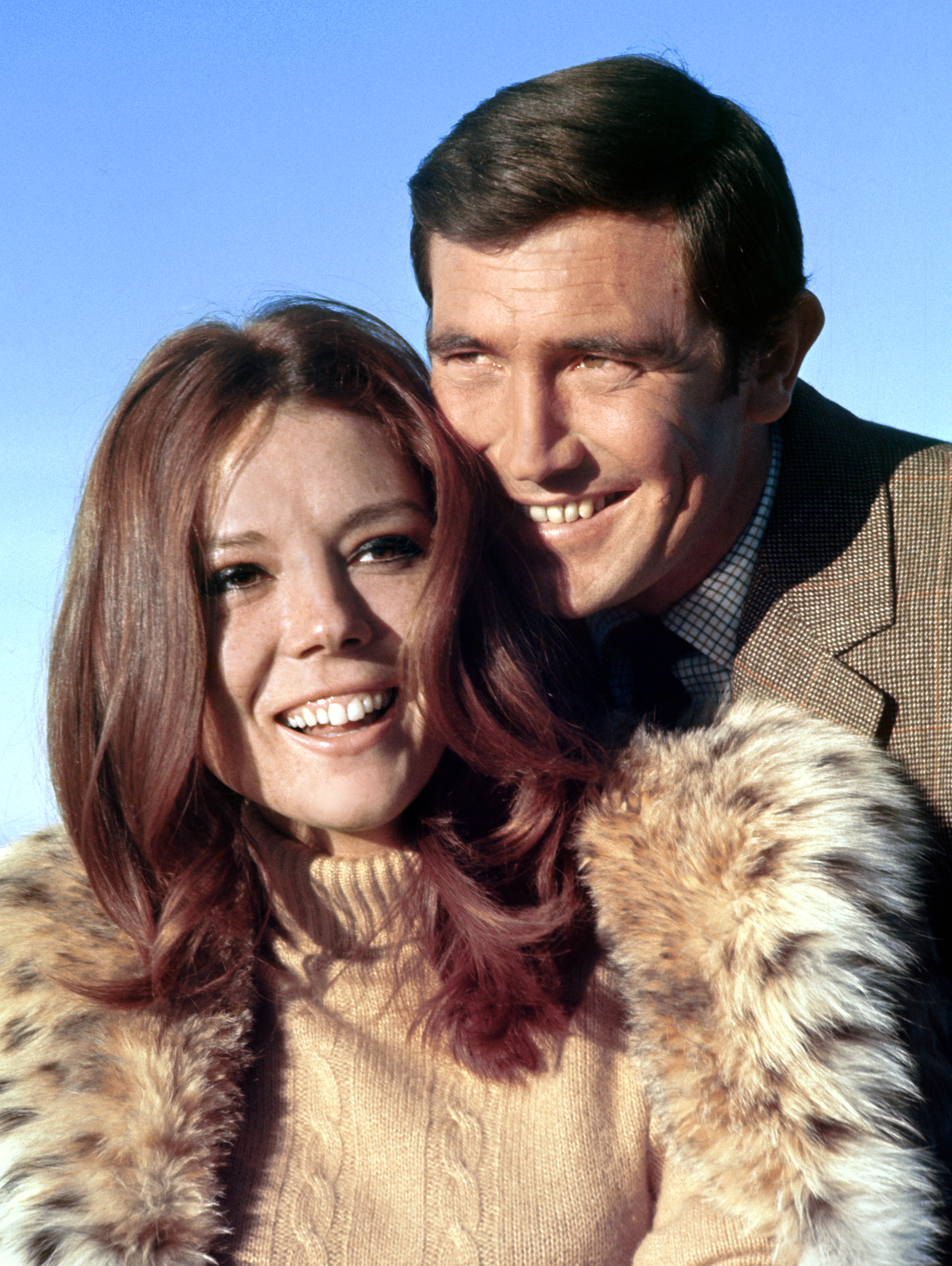
Lazenby with Diana Rigg while filming On Her Majesty's Secret Service in November 1968

In 1968, after Sean Connery had left the role of James Bond, producer Albert R. Broccoli met Lazenby for the first time while they were getting their hair cut at the same barbershop. Broccoli later saw him in the Big Fry commercial and felt he could possibly portray Bond, on which basis he invited him to do a screen test.

Lazenby dressed for the part by sporting several sartorial Bond elements, such as a Rolex Submariner wristwatch and an Anthony Sinclair tailored suit (Sean Connery’s tailor as James Bond) which had been ordered, but not collected, by Connery.

Broccoli offered him an audition. During the audition, Lazenby accidentally punched a professional wrestler, who was acting as stunt coordinator, in the face, impressing Broccoli with his ability to display aggression. Director Peter R. Hunt felt that just because Lazenby starred in the movie, it did not make him an actor.

In July 1969, after making On Her Majesty's Secret Service, Lazenby returned home to Queanbeyan to see his parents. He said he had 18 films to consider, but most of them were bad, adding that he had to "wait and see." He also told the press, "I don't think I'm ready for anything like Hamlet yet but I'd love to play Ned Kelly."

Lazenby was offered the chance to portray Bond on film again, in The Man with the Golden Gun. However, prior to the release of On Her Majesty's Secret Service, Lazenby decided to leave the role of Bond after his agent, Ronan O'Rahilly, convinced him that the secret agent would be archaic in the liberated 1970s. Lazenby also felt that he had received poor treatment on the film set. Several of his co-stars felt that Lazenby had made a mistake, including Diana Rigg and Desmond Llewelyn. Lazenby acknowledged the worry but insisted that he had made the correct decision.

At the time of the release of On Her Majesty's Secret Service, Lazenby's performance received mixed reviews. Critics felt that while he was physically convincing, he delivered his lines poorly. In the years since the film was released, public perception has become more positive. Broccoli publicly defended Lazenby's performance, saying that while he was not the best actor, he was still great for the role of Bond. He did admit that he found Lazenby's post-movie attitude annoying, feeling that he did not respect the character and was arrogant.

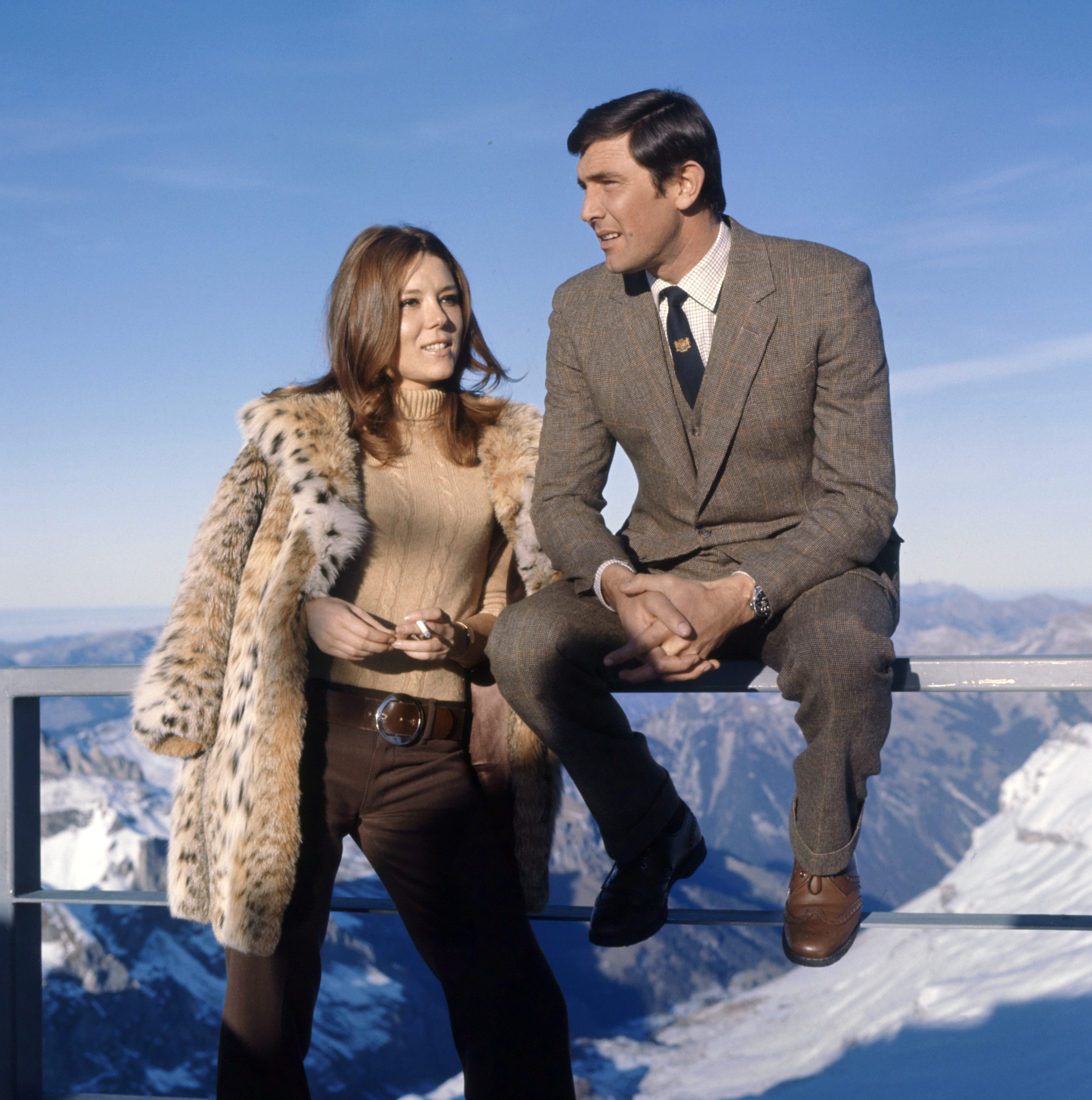
Diana Rigg and George Lazenby

Lazenby was considered to reprise the role of James Bond in Never Say Never Again. Sean Connery was chosen for the role instead.

Lazenby has appeared as James Bond in various parodies and unofficial 007 roles, including the 1983 television film The Return of the Man from U.N.C.L.E., where his character is identified only by the initials J. B., and the 1996 video game Fox Hunt. Additionally, he appeared in an episode of The New Alfred Hitchcock Presents called "Diamonds Aren't Forever." In 2012, Lazenby made a guest appearance on the Canadian sketch comedy series This Hour Has 22 Minutes, spoofing the 007 series in a skit called "Help, I've Skyfallen and I Can't Get Up".

== Post-Bond career ==
Lazenby made another film a year after On Her Majesty's Secret Service – Universal Soldier (1971), which he helped write. He said the movie was "anti-guns and anti-Bond". Due to his reported poor treatment on the set of On Her Majesty's Secret Service, he sought out a director whom he would work with better and found Cy Endfield. Lazenby helped to fund the film. Lazenby admitted that after he left the role of Bond, he was unhireable. He landed few roles, to the point that his agent described him as "difficult".

Lazenby next appeared in the 1972 Italian giallo film Who Saw Her Die? opposite Anita Strindberg, a performance for which he lost 35 pounds and received positive reviews. He spent the next 15 months sailing around the world with Chrissie Townson; the trip ended when she became pregnant with their first child, prompting Lazenby to settle down and try to reactivate his career as an actor.

In February 1973, Lazenby revealed that he had spent all of the money he had earned from playing Bond, had experienced two nervous breakdowns, and had become an alcoholic. He felt that if he had continued in the role, he would have gone crazy due to the mental stress that the role brings. He later said, "I burnt some bridges behind me, and it was fun, really. I'm sort of glad I did it and I know I won't have to do it again. I can look back and laugh because I didn't hurt anyone — except myself."

Lazenby played a role in the BBC's Play for Today series in 1973, starring in Roger Smith's The Operation. He was meant to follow it with an Anglo-Italian western made in Turkey, followed by a film about rioting students in pre-Castro Cuba, but neither was made.

=== Hong Kong ===
In 1973, Lazenby said he was "flat broke" when he went to Hong Kong to meet Bruce Lee and producer Raymond Chow. They ended up offering him $10,000 ($72,500 today) to appear in a film with Lee, which was going to be the Golden Harvest film Game of Death. However, the plan collapsed after Lee's sudden death. Lazenby was meant to meet Lee for dinner on the day Lee died.

In the end, Lazenby shot three films for Golden Harvest: The Shrine of Ultimate Bliss, The Man from Hong Kong (1975) (also known as The Dragon Flies), and A Queen's Ransom (1976).

=== Australia ===
In the mid-1970s, Lazenby appeared in a number of television movies shot in his native Australia, and an episode of the local police drama series Matlock Police. He also returned to modelling, appearing in a number of advertisements for Benson & Hedges cigarettes. In a 1977 interview with the Australian Women's Weekly, he stated that he did not really feel like an actor as he had very few acting credits, but hoped that he could find more work.

=== Hollywood ===
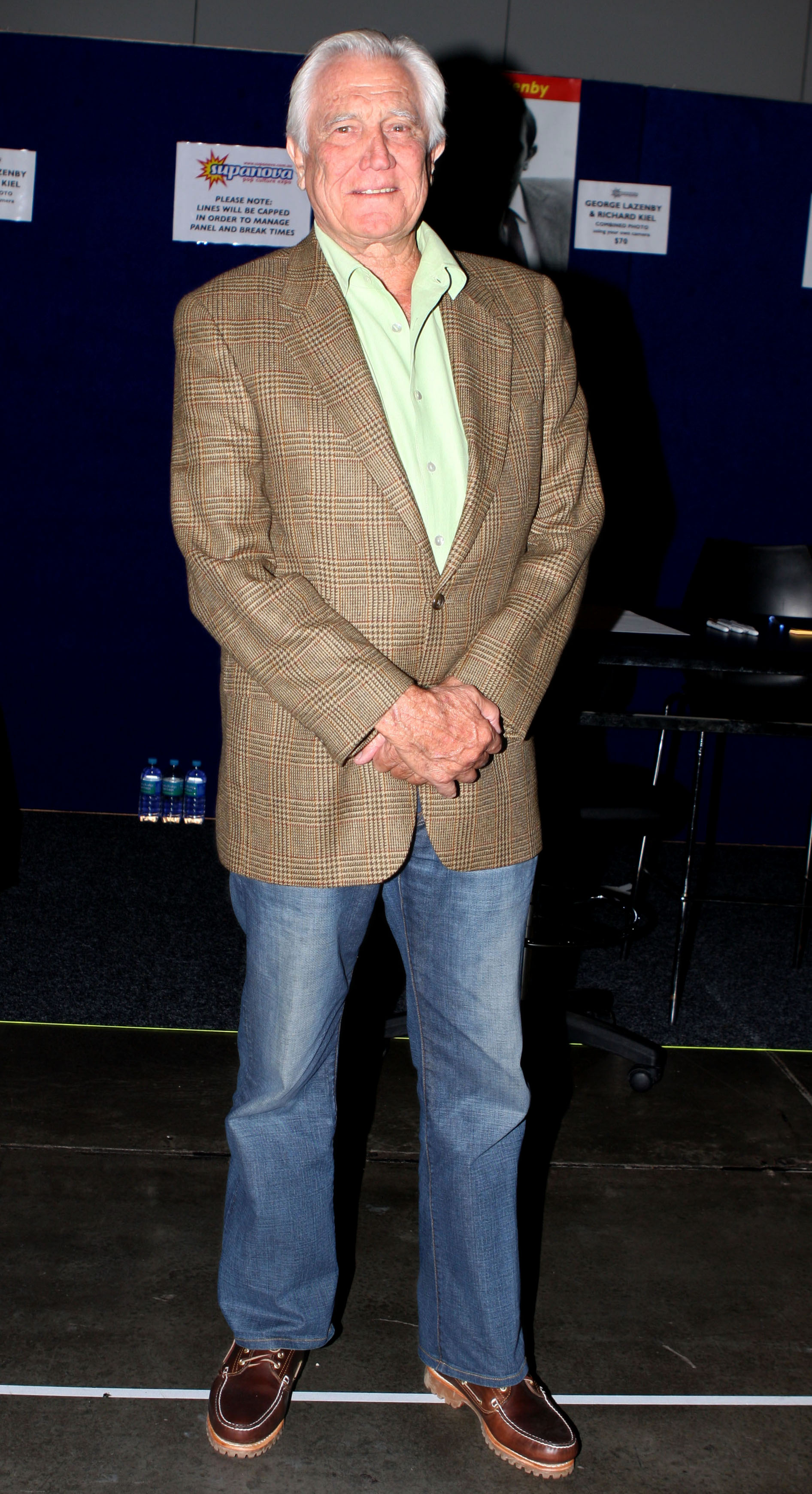
Lazenby in 2014

In the late 1970s, Lazenby moved to Hollywood, California, where he started taking acting lessons and set about trying to obtain more acting work.

In 1978, Broccoli described casting Lazenby as his biggest mistake, claiming that the actor couldn't deal with fame and labelling him as "very arrogant". He felt that Lazenby did not understand how a film set worked and did not mesh well with the rest of the cast and crew. Sean Connery came to Lazenby's defence, saying that in the time that he knew Lazenby, he had not acted arrogantly, instead applying that label to Broccoli.

Lazenby went on to add:

It hasn't been easy, trying to climb back .... I admit I acted stupidly. It went to my head, everything that was happening to me. But remember, it was my first film .... Now what I've got to do is live down my past; convince people I'm not the same person who made a fool of himself all those years ago. I know I can do it. All I need is the chance.

In 1978, he took out an advertisement in Variety, offering himself for acting work in any role for very little money. He told a journalist for the Chicago Tribune. "People ask me if the Bond movie wasn't worth it if it got me into acting. It's true that it got me in, but it wasn't worth the ten years it cost me." The following year, he had a substantial supporting role in Saint Jack (1979), directed by Peter Bogdanovich. The Australian magazine Filmink called it "one of the best things – if not the best thing – Lazenby ever did outside of Bond."

Lazenby was particularly keen to obtain a role in The Thorn Birds, but the project would not be produced until years later, and without him. He did manage to secure roles in Hawaii Five-O and Evening in Byzantium. The latter was seen by Harry Saltzman, who offered him a leading role in a proposed science fiction film, The Micronauts. Lazenby made a guest appearance as Jor-El on the television series Superboy, in a two-part episode during the series' second season in 1990. He appeared with Sylvia Kristel in several new Emmanuelle films in 1993, many of which appeared on cable television. In 1993, Lazenby had a part in the film Gettysburg as Confederate Brigadier General J. Johnston Pettigrew.

On 5 November 2013, comedian Jim Jefferies stated in an interview that Lazenby would be playing Jefferies's father in the then upcoming second season of his FX network sitcom Legit. He appeared as himself in the 2017 docudrama Becoming Bond. In 2019, Lazenby starred as Dr. Jason Love in an audiobook version of James Leasor's spy novel Passport to Oblivion.

In 2024, Lazenby announced his retirement from acting and public appearances. He cited his concerns over his age and a desire to spend more time with his family.

== Influence on popular culture ==
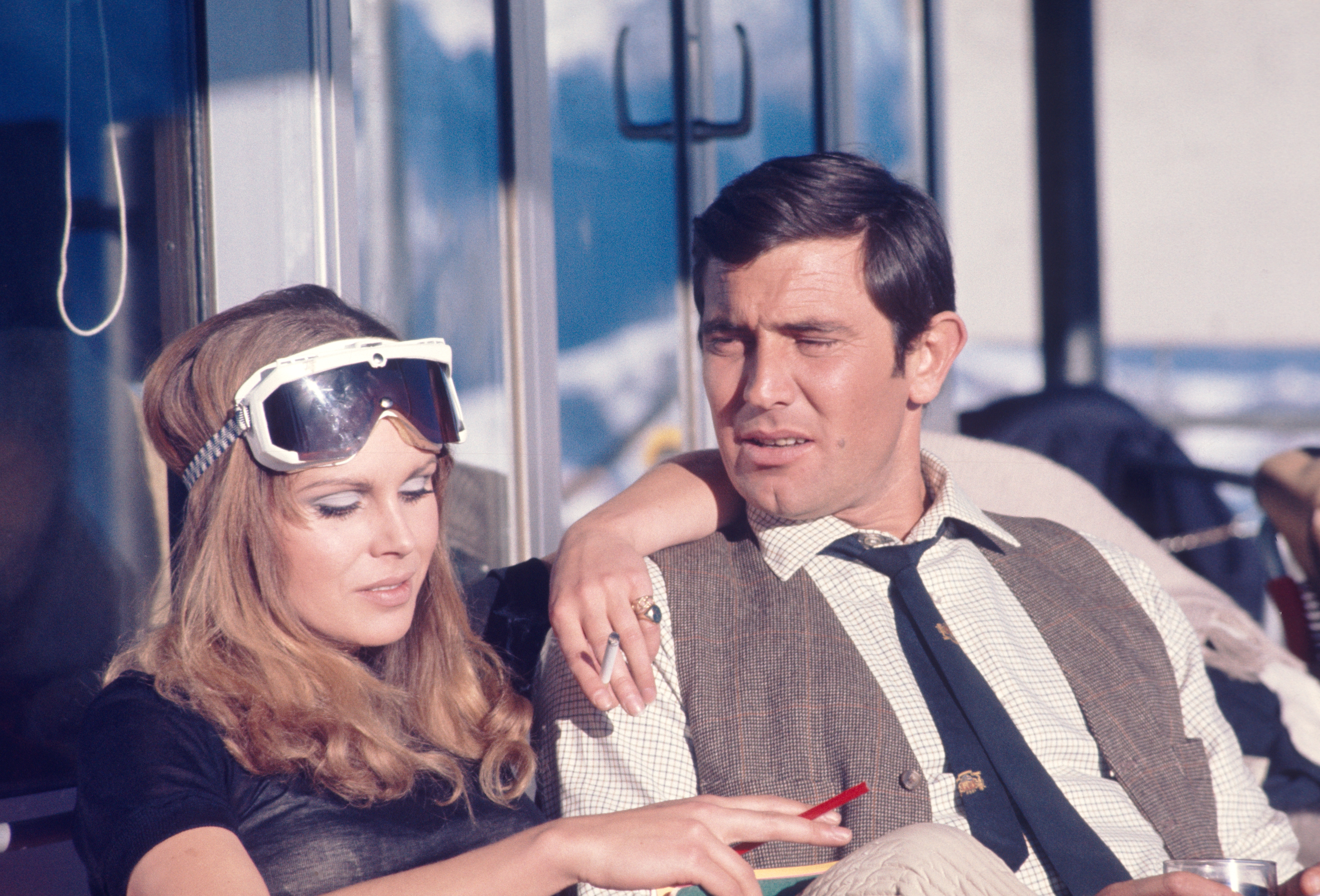
Joanna Lumley and George Lazenby during On Her Majesty's Secret Service

Lazenby's single portrayal of the Bond character and his lack of standing as a favourite in the series has resulted in his name being used as a metaphor for forgettable acting efforts in other entertainment franchises and for entities that are largely ignored.

In his review of Batman & Robin (1997), widely regarded as the weakest and least successful film in the Batman film franchise, Mick LaSalle of the San Francisco Chronicle said that George Clooney "should go down in history as the George Lazenby of the series". Actor Paul McGann has described himself as "the George Lazenby of Doctor Who". McGann's only starring television role as the Eighth Doctor was in the 1996 television movie.

In 2009, Norwegian singer-songwriter and guitarist Sondre Lerche released a song called "Like Lazenby" on his fifth studio album Heartbeat Radio in which he laments squandered opportunities and wishes for a "second try". Lerche had received a videotape of the film On Her Majesty's Secret Service as a child; he sent away for a free copy of the movie, only to find he had joined a James Bond film club. He got into trouble when his mother was contacted to pay for the membership. Years later, watching the movie again on DVD, he found it to be "a perfect metaphor for life's disappointments".

The title of Matthew Bauer's 2022 documentary The Other Fellow, about the lives of real men named James Bond, is inspired by Lazenby's line in the beginning of On Her Majesty's Secret Service, "This never happened to the other fellow", a reference to Sean Connery. Bauer told FilmInk that he chose the title because "these are the situations that our characters face – continuously being in the shadow of this movie icon."

== Personal life ==
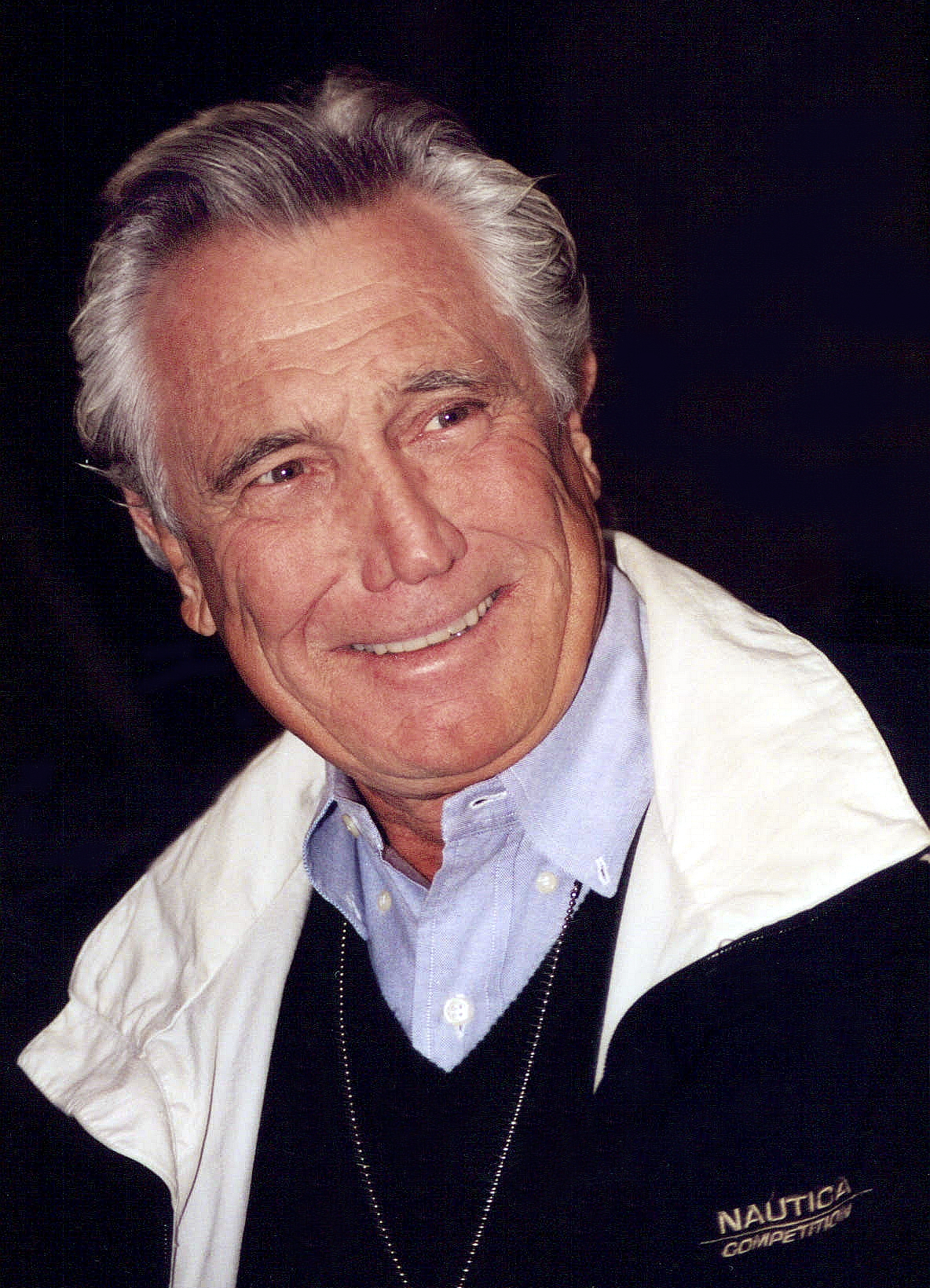
Lazenby attended the tennis match of his future wife, Pam Shriver, in 2001

While working as a car salesman at the age of 21, Lazenby fathered a daughter, Jennifer, with Maureen Powell, who was then an Australian army sergeant and a physical education and fitness instructor at Royal Military College, Duntroon.

In 1973, Lazenby married his girlfriend of three years, Christina Ross "Chrissie" Townson (later Matser), an heiress of the Gannett family. They subsequently had two children, daughter Melanie Andrea Lazenby, born on 13 September 1973, and son Zachary "Zack" Lazenby, born on 9 November 1974, at Woden Valley Hospital (now Canberra Hospital) in Garran, Canberra, ACT. Zachary was diagnosed with a malignant brain tumour when he was 11 and died at age 19 in 1994. The two divorced shortly after, in 1995. Melanie is a real estate broker in New York, working for Douglas Elliman.

In 2002, Lazenby married former tennis player Pam Shriver and they had three children, including son George Lazenby Jr., born on 12 July 2004. The family lived in Brentwood, California. In August 2008, it was reported that Shriver had filed for divorce from Lazenby, citing "irreconcilable differences". Their divorce was finalised in May 2011.

In late 2023, Lazenby was injured in a fall and he was briefly hospitalised. On 18 December, he returned home. In 2025, his ex-wife Pam Shriver revealed that Lazenby has dementia and that she is caring for him.
