= Rajendra Mullick =

Indian philanthropist (1819–1887)

- Born: 24 June 1819; Kolkata, West Bengal, India
- Died: 1887 (aged 67–68)
- Occupations: Art lover, philanthropist

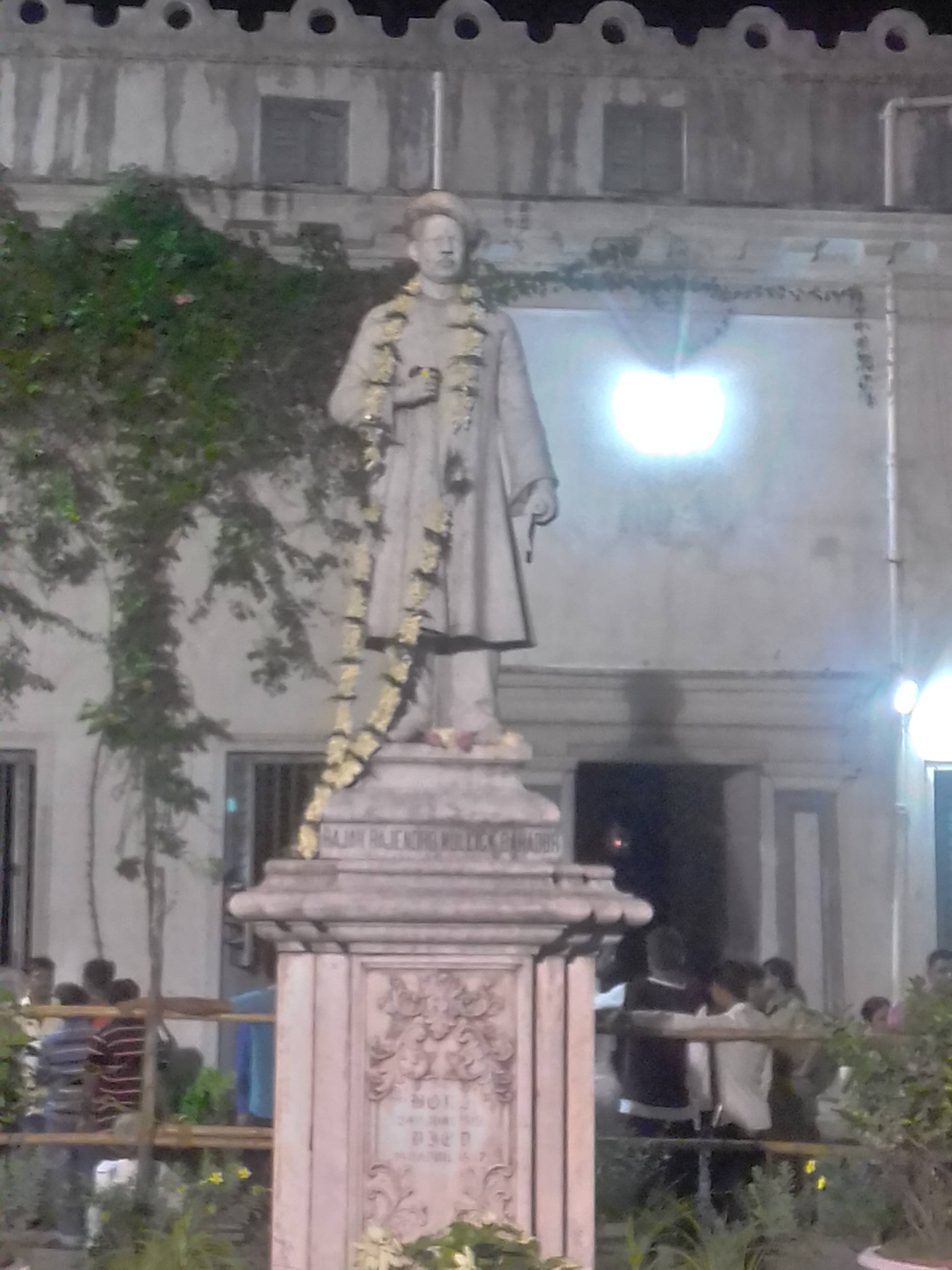
Statue of Raja Rajendra Mullick

Raja Rajendra Mullick (Bengali: রাজেন্দ্র মল্লিক; 24 June 1819 – 1887) was an Indian art lover and philanthropist. He was the scion of Mullick family of Chorbagan and built the Marble Palace of Kolkata.

== Early life ==
The Mullick family of Chorbagan was founded by Ramakrishna Mullick, who made his fortune in business. Rajendra was adopted by Nilmani Mullick, a descendant of Ramakrishna Mullick, when he was a child. At the age of three, Nilmani died, leaving behind Rajendra to inherit all his wealth. In his childhood, Rajendra received lessons in English, Sanskrit and Persian.

== Career ==
In 1835, at the age of 16, Rajendra began the construction of the Marble Palace. It was completed in 1840. In 1866, he opened a relief centre in Kolkata to serve the famine-stricken people of Orissa who had taken shelter in the city. He was decorated with Rai Bahadur in 1867 and Raja Bahadur in 1878 for this benevolence. When the Zoological Gardens was set up in 1876, he donated many birds and animals from his personal collection. They were kept in a house named the Mullick House inside the zoo.
