= Calcutta Light Horse =

British cavalry regiment

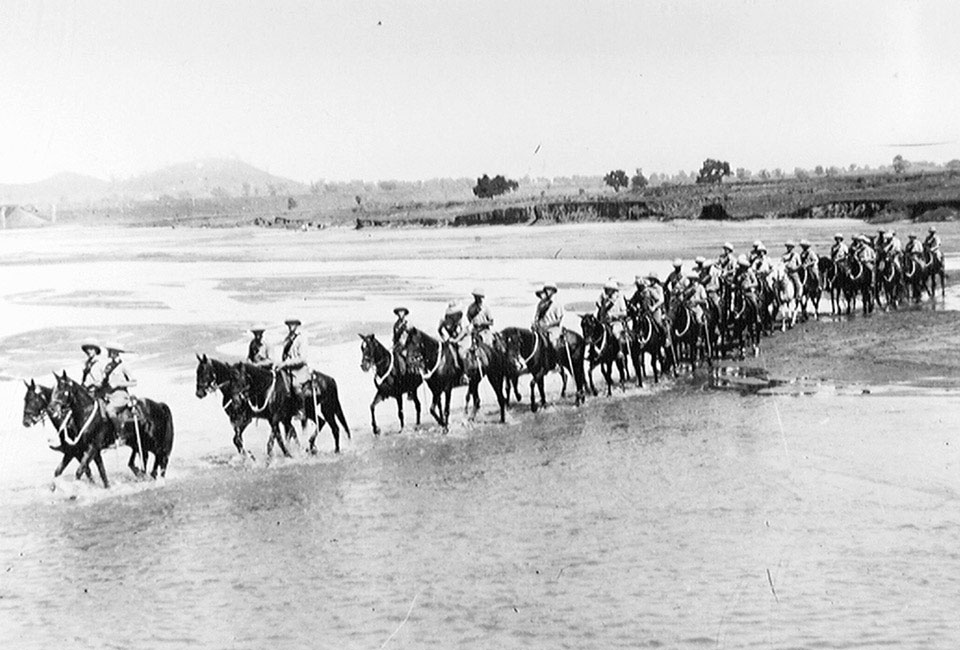
- The Calcutta Light Horse crossing the River Pataro near Mahanpur, northern India c. October 1925
- Active: 1872–1947
- Country: India
- Allegiance: British Empire
- Branch: British Indian Army
- Type: Cavalry
- Headquarters: Calcutta
- Engagements: Second Boer War; Second World War

The Calcutta Light Horse was a cavalry regiment of the British Indian Army raised in 1872. It was disbanded in 1947 following India's independence from British rule.

== Operation Creek ==
On reserve since the Boer War, they are most noted for their part (with members of the Calcutta Scottish) in Operation Creek against the German merchant ship Ehrenfels. The operation was organised by SOE's India Mission. It was kept covert, to avoid the political ramifications of contravening Portuguese neutrality in Goa, and was not revealed until thirty-five years afterwards, in 1978. The Ehrenfels was known to be transmitting information on Allied ship movements to U-boats from Mormugao harbour in Portugal's neutral territory of Goa.

The Light Horse embarked on the barge Phoebe at Calcutta and sailed around India to Goa. After the Ehrenfels was sunk in March 1943 by the team of British saboteurs, British intelligence dispatched an open message over the air falsely warning that the British would invade Goa. The crews of the other two German merchant ships in the harbour, the Drachenfels and Braunfels, received the message and scuttled their ships in Goa's harbour in the belief that they were protecting their ships from capture by the British. Italian ships in the harbour were also destroyed. In 1951 all three German merchant ships were salvaged.

As the end credits of the 1980 film The Sea Wolves state, "during the first 11 days of March 1943, U-boats sank 12 Allied ships in the Indian Ocean. After the Light Horse raid on Goa, only one ship was lost in the remainder of the month."

== Members ==
- Honorary Colonel Louis Mountbatten (1947)
- Colonel Archie Pugh 1890-1922 (1912-1922 as Colonel)
- Colonel Bill Grice
- Colonel John Pugh
- Corporal John Raymond
- Sir Owain Jenkins
- Ralph Wesley Dennis
- Alastair “Red Mac” MacFarlane
- Charles Ian Turcan MBE

== Media ==
In 1978 James Leasor wrote an account of the Ehrenfels mission in the book Boarding Party: The Last Charge of the Calcutta Light Horse. The film The Sea Wolves based on the book was made in 1980, with actors David Niven, Gregory Peck, Trevor Howard, Roger Moore and Patrick Macnee.

== Legacy ==
- The Light Horse Bar at the Saturday Club in Kolkata is named after the regiment. The club was founded in 1875 and is located on Wood Street. The bar houses a collection of regimental memorabilia.
- The Calcutta Light Horse Bar at the Oriental Club in London is named after the regiment.
- British Eventing presents a Calcutta Light Horse Trophy to the owner of the British horse gaining the highest number of points during a horse racing season.
