= Passport to Oblivion =

1964 spy novel by James Leasor

- First edition
- Author: James Leasor
- Language: English
- Series: Jason Love
- Genre: Spy thriller
- Publisher: Heinemann (UK); Lippincott (US)
- Publication date: 1964
- Publication place: United Kingdom
- Media type: Print
- Followed by: Passport to Peril

Passport to Oblivion is a 1964 spy novel by the British writer James Leasor. It was the first of nine novels featuring the character Jason Love.

A country doctor is recruited by British intelligence to go to Iran to investigate the recent disappearance of a British agent.

== Plot ==
K, a British agent is assassinated in Tehran. Fearing that the MI6 has been penetrated by the recent defections of agents to the USSR, the deputy head of MI6, MacGillivray needs to turn to someone who is not on any list of MI6 staff. He turns to Jason Love, a West Country doctor who had done some intelligence work for MacGillivray in India during World War II. Love is about to leave on holiday when contacted by MacGillivray, but is persuaded to find out what is going on under the cover of attending a medical conference in Tehran. Love is a classic car enthusiast and drives a very rare US built Cord. MacGillivray uses the hook of seeing an even rarer Cord Le Baron which is in Tehran as the bait to get Love to accept the mission.

Whilst changing planes in Rome Love is met by MacGillivray’s contact, a model called Simone. The two get along well, causing Love to miss his flight; the plane he should have been on explodes shortly after take-off. Love starts to get suspicious about Simone.

Love arrives in Tehran and meets another agent, Parkington, who has also been dispatched to Tehran on the same mission. Together they discover a communist plot to assassinate the pro-British Shah of Iran during a visit to Persepolis, thereby threatening Britain's Eastern oil treaties.

Parkington is wounded but Love manages to stop the assassination. However, when escaping, he is captured by the Russians who are behind the plot.

They put Love on a plane touring the world, the so-called "Dove of Peace" mission, and try to extract information from him. Also on board is Simone.

A Russian defector reveals Love's location to the British intelligence service. When the plane flies over the frozen wastes in the North of Canada, the British arrange a fake emergency to force the plane to land, enabling Love to escape. Simone and her Russian handler are killed in the process.

== Background ==
There is a lot of crossover in the backstories of Jason Love and James Leasor. Both Love and Leasor share the same biography up to their war service in Burma. They both went up to Oriel College afterwards but while Love read medicine, Leasor took a degree in English. Leasor had thought about studying to be a doctor before military service, however the inspiration for Love as a country doctor was provided by his elder sister, Dr Mary Meyers, who was a GP in Stogumber, Somerset (where Love has his practice) for fifty years.

James Leasor was also very keen on classic cars. He owned a Cord, like Love – it was the one that was driven by David Niven in Where the Spies Are and so was able to describe its idiosyncrasies from personal knowledge.

The idea of the reluctant amateur spy also came from Leasor’s time as a foreign correspondent during the 1950s, when it was common for journalists to be asked to do small unofficial, and therefore deniable, jobs by members of the British intelligence community.

== Film adaptation ==
In 1966 it was made into a British film Where the Spies Are directed by Val Guest and starring David Niven, Françoise Dorléac and John Le Mesurier.

== Audio adaptation ==
In 2019 it was made into an audio drama by Spiteful Puppet starring George Lazenby, Terence Stamp, Michael Brandon, Glynis Barber and Nickolas Grace.

== Bibliography ==
- Goble, Alan. The Complete Index to Literary Sources in Film. Walter de Gruyter, 1999.
- Mavis, Paul. The Espionage Filmography: United States Releases, 1898 through 1999. McFarland, 2015.
