= John Manuel Vaz =

Indian politician (1939–2018)

Minister of Revenue & Urban Development Government of Goa
- In office 30 November 1998 – 8 February 1999
- Chief Minister: Luizinho Faleiro

Member of Legislative Assembly
- In office 1994–1999
- Constituency: Mormugao

Personal details
- Born: 21 March 1939 Nuvem, Goa
- Died: 7 December 2018 (aged 79) Manipal Hospital, Dona Paula, Goa
- Party: Independent

John Manuel Vaz (21 March 1939 - 7 December 2018) was an Indian politician who served as a Cabinet Minister in the Government of Goa headed by Luizinho Faleiro from 30 November 1998 until his resignation on 3 February 1999. He won the 1994 Goa Legislative Assembly elections from the Mormugao constituency. Vaz was the President of the Mormugao Municipal Council from January to October 1987.

== Personal life ==
Vaz was born at Nuvem, Salcete on 21 March 1939. Since his family wanted him to become a priest, a young Vaz attended the seminary at Saligao. He left the seminary suddenly as his interest was the family business. He obtained a Matriculation after which he earned a diploma in bakery (food craft). He married Maria Apolonia Leonia Sousa. John Manuel Vaz and Apolonia had five children: Marcia, Giovanni, Rency, Tricia and Yolancy (Pinky).

Vaz was the founder member of the All Goa Association of Bakers and served as the President of the body from 1987 to 1990. He was also the Vice President of the All Goa Association of Bakers. Vaz was the President of the Rotary Club of Vasco from 1987 to 1988.

== Political career ==
Vaz worked as a social worker in the Baina area of Vasco town. He served as a member of the Municipal Council of Mormugao from 1985 to 1990. He was the President of the Mormugao Municipal Council from January to October 1987.

He contested the 1989 elections to the Goa Legislative Assembly from the Mormugao constituency as a candidate of the Maharashtrawadi Gomantak Party. He lost to Sheikh Hassan Haroon of the Indian National Congress with a margin of 212 votes. He was elected to the Goa Legislative Assembly from Mormugao in the 1994 elections as an independent candidate.

Vaz served as a Cabinet Minister in the Luizinho Faleiro ministry from 30 November 1998 until his resignation on 3 February 1999. He resigned along with Deu Mandrekar, who was the Minister for Social Welfare, thereby reducing the Faliero government to a minority. In the Luizinho Faleiro ministry, Vaz held the portfolios of Revenue & Urban Development.

John Manuel Vaz was a member of the Goa Legislative Assembly's Committee on Government Assurances as well as the Committee on Delegated Legislation from 1995 to 1996. Vaz also took efforts for the four-laning of the Verna to Mormugao National Highway and the work started during his tenure as the MLA.

He unsuccessfully contested the 1999 Goa Legislative Assembly elections from Mormugao as a candidate of the Goa Rajiv Congress Party. However, he remains the lone independent candidate to win the Mormugao seat till date.

=== Baina red-light district ===
Vaz belonged to Baina and was unhappy about the red-light area which existed in Baina. He had expressed his anger about the area while serving as a social worker and a member of the Municipal Council. After being elected as a member of the Goa Legislative Assembly, Vaz took steps to demolish the area. On 2 September 1997, Vaz led a protest march of the citizens against the red-light area at Baina, demanding that the area be cleaned.
