= Vasant Joshi =

Indian businessman (1921–2013)

- Portrait of Vasant Joshi

Member of Goa Legislative Assembly
- In office 1972–1977
- Preceded by: Gajanan Patil
- Succeeded by: Sheikh Hassan Haroon
- Constituency: Mormugao

Personal details
- Born: Vasant Subrai Joshi; 27 May 1921; Vasco da Gama, Portuguese Goa
- Died: 27 December 2013 (aged 92); Vasco da Gama, Goa
- Political party: Maharashtrawadi Gomantak Party
- Occupation: Businessman

Vasant Subrai Joshi (27 May 1921 – 27 December 2013) was an Indian politician and businessman from Goa, who was a Member of the Legislative Assembly (MLA) representing the Mormugao Assembly constituency.

== Early life ==
Vasant Subrai Joshi was born on 27 May 1921 in Vasco da Gama, Portuguese Goa.

== Career ==
=== Politics ===
Joshi was elected as MLA from the Mormugao Assembly constituency between 1972 and 1977.

=== Business ===
Joshi operated multiple businesses in Vasco, including the dealership of a popular car brand.

=== Education ===
After the Liberation of Goa, Vasco had no college. Joshi thus set up the Mormugao Education Society (MES) college in Joshi building, Vasco, on 14 June 1972. The college was later shifted to Zuarinagar.

== Personal life ==
Joshi and his family are linked to the Vasco Saptah. Every year, Joshi would place the shreefal (transl. blessed coconut) in front of the statue of Lord Damodar at the Joshi house, signifying the beginning of the festival.

He had two daughters and five sons.

During the events of Operation Vijay, Joshi offered his home as shelter to the common public of the city of Vasco.

== Death ==
Joshi died on 27 December 2013 at the SMRC Hospital, Chicalim, after a brief illness. His body was cremated at the Khariwada crematorium on 28 December, with hundreds in attendance.

== Legacy ==
The MES College was renamed to MES Vasant Joshi College in 2023.
