= Urminda Mascarenhas =

Indian politician and educator (1926–2010)

- Portrait of Mascarenhas

Member of Goa, Daman and Diu Legislative Assembly
- In office 11 December 1963 – 1967
- Preceded by: constituency established
- Succeeded by: Gajanan Patil
- Constituency: Mormugao

Personal details
- Born: 16 January 1926 Goa, Portuguese India
- Died: 20 February 2010 (aged 84) Vasco da Gama, Goa, India
- Party: United Goans Party (1963–1967)
- Spouse: Marcelino Da Lima Leitao (died 1972)
- Children: 5
- Education: Bombay University (B.Ed, B.Sc)
- Occupation: Politician; educator; businesswoman

Urminda Mascarenhas e Lima Leitao (née Mascarenhas; 16 January 1926 – 20 February 2010) was an Indian politician, educator and businesswoman. She was a former member of the Goa, Daman and Diu Legislative Assembly, representing the Mormugao Assembly constituency from 1963 to 1967. Mascarenhas was the first woman MLA to be elected in the 1963 Goa, Daman and Diu Legislative Assembly election, also the first and only woman legislator from the Mormugao Assembly constituency. (Note: a source from goanet mentions Mascarenhas represented the Vasco Da Gama Assembly constituency which is false.) She was known for her diligent attitude and radical speeches in the state legislative assembly.

== Career ==
=== Teaching ===
Mascarenhas was a principal at A.J De Almeida High School, Ponda from 1948 to 1952, before contesting in the Goa, Daman and Diu elections in 1963.

=== Politics (1963–1968) ===
Mascarenhas, along with fellow politician Jack de Sequeira, was involved in a movement that led to the eventual victory of the Goa Opinion Poll.

Mascarenhas was a founding member of the United Goans Party (UGP) along with her husband, Marcelino. She contested in the 1963 Goa, Daman and Diu Legislative Assembly election from the Mormugao Assembly constituency on the UGP ticket and emerged victorious, serving for five years from 1963 to 1967. Some of her mentors in politics were C. Rajagopalachari, S. Nijalingappa, former chief minister of Mysore State and Rajmohan Gandhi. Mascarenhas later left politics to join her husband in business in 1968.

== Personal life ==
Mascarenhas completed her studies in Bachelor of Science and Bachelor of Training (now Bachelor of Education) from Bombay University. She was married to Marcelino Da Lima Leitao and they had six children together. Marcelino died in August 1972. Her son, Noel, a football administrator and commentator, died in Kolkata in September 2009.

== Death ==
On 20 February 2010, Mascarenhas died from a prolonged illness at Dr. Baban's Nursing Home at Vasco da Gama, Goa.
