= Chicalim =

- Census town
- Location of Chicalim in Goa Chicalim (India)
- Coordinates: 15°23′58″N 73°50′27″E
- Country: India
- State: Goa
- District: South Goa
- Sub-district: Mormugão
- Elevation: 45 m (148 ft)

Population (2011)
  - Total: 6,933
- Time zone: UTC+5:30 (IST)
- Postcode: 403711
- Area code: 0832

Chicalim is a census town in Morumugão Sub-District, Goa, India. It is a suburb to the port city of Vasco da Gama.

== Geography ==
Chicalim is located at 15°23′58″N 73°50′27″E at an average elevation of 45 metres (148 ft).

== Demographics ==
As of the 2011 Indian census, Chicalim had a population of 6,933. Males constituted 57% of the population and females 43%. Chicalim had a literacy rate of 93.21%, higher than state average of 88.70%: male literacy was 96.13% and female literacy was 89.28%. 8.91% of the population was under 6 years of age.

== Government ==
Chicalim, being a village, is governed by a Panchayat, or local rural governing body, under the Panchayati Raj Act. Latest panchayat elections took place in August, 2022

Chicalim comes under Dabolim constituency for the state assembly after delimitation of wards. Earlier it was under the Cortalim constituency. The current MLA is Mauvin Godinho of the Bhartiya Janta Party (BJP) .
