= Sankalp Amonkar =

Indian politician and businessman (born 1975)

- Amonkar in 2026

Member of Goa Legislative Assembly
- Incumbent
- Assumed office 10 March 2022
- Preceded by: Milind Naik
- Constituency: Mormugao

Personal details
- Born: 30 June 1975 (age 51) South Goa, Goa, India
- Party: Bharatiya Janata Party (2022–present)
- Other political affiliations: Indian National Congress (until 2022)
- Occupation: Politician; businessman
- Website: facebook.com/SankalpAmonkar1313

Sankalp Amonkar (born 30 June 1975) is an Indian politician and businessman who serves as a member of the Goa Legislative Assembly, representing the Mormugao Assembly constituency. He contested on the Indian National Congress ticket and emerged victorious by defeating three-term BJP MLA, Millind Naik by a margin of 1,941 votes.

Amonkar is a former Deputy Leader of Congress Legislative Party, former Vice President of Goa Pradesh Congress Committee, former State President of National Union of Seafarers of India and President of Pradesh Youth Congress. He joined the Bharatiya Janata Party in 2022.

== Early and personal life ==
Sankalp Amonkar was born on 30 June 1975 to Padmanabh Amonkar in South Goa, India. He completed his graduation in Bachelor of Arts from Mormugao Education Society Zuarinagar, affiliated with Goa University in 1997. Amonkar is married to businesswoman, Shradha Amonkar and currently resides at Vasco, Goa.

== Career ==
In November 2026, he was made a minister for agriculture in the cabinet. His other portfolios include coir, handicrafts, textiles, consumer affairs and civil supplies.
