= Narharibua Volvoikar =

Indian musician (1920–1994)

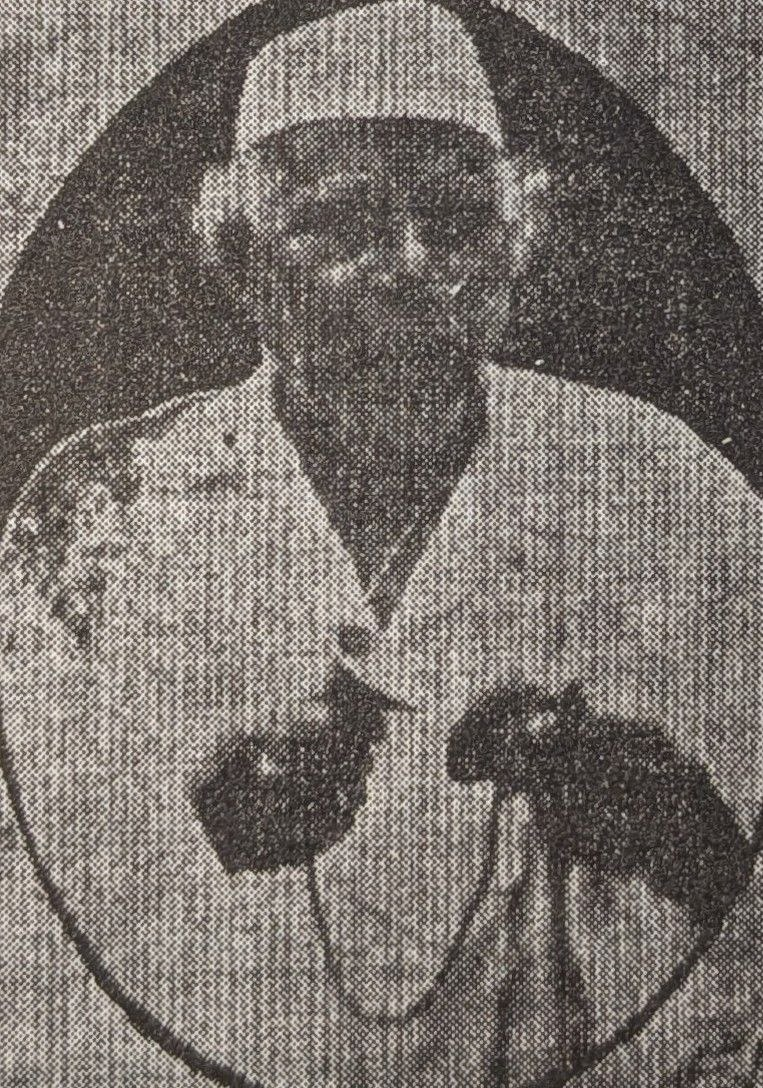
- Born: 10 May 1920; Juvẽ, St Estevam, Portuguese Goa
- Died: 15 May 1994 (aged 74); Bandora, Goa
- Occupations: Singer, stage actor, theatre director, and bhajan artist

Narharibua Volvoikar (10 May 1920 – 15 May 1994) was an Indian singer, stage actor, theatre director, and bhajan artist.

== Early life and background ==
Volvoikar was born on 10 May 1920 in Juvẽ, St Estevam, Portuguese Goa. His mother was Subodhini and his father was Vinayak Volvoikar, who was widely known by the moniker "Dadi". His mother died when he was five years old, after which he was raised by his father.

Volvoikar completed his primary education up to the fourth standard in Marathi and Portuguese in Bandora. His father was a theatrical artist, actor, and instructor who taught him stagecraft. Having inherited a high-pitched singing voice, Volvoikar received formal music training under Natvarya Bhagvaram Achrekar.

== Career ==
=== Theatre ===
As a child, Volvoikar began appearing in minor roles on stage alongside his father. The father-son duo performed across Goan villages in productions such as Prem Sanyas, Shivajila Shah, Hira Harapla, Samsaykallol, Pranayikitak, Sant Pundalik, Darwancha Diwa, and Shah Shivaji. They were frequently invited to stage performances for local festivals, temple jatras, and community fundraising events.

Beginning in 1941, during the professional theatre era, Volvoikar joined the Navjeevan drama company. He subsequently worked with Sarvarambapu Barve's Prabhat Sangeet troupe. Through performing roles in classical musical plays such as Sangeet Saubhadra, Manapman, Sharada, Vidyaharan, and Punyaprabhav, he developed an understanding of musical nuances and expression.

In Maharashtra, he joined Natvarya Gangadharpant Londhe's Rajaram Sangeet drama company and later worked with comedian Damuanna Malvankar's Prabhakar drama troupe, where he refined his acting technique, diction, and stage movement. During the Goa-India border closure between 1954 and 1961, Volvoikar collaborated with local artists to stage theatrical performances in Goa. Later in his career, he directed numerous local festival plays across Goa alongside his father.

=== Devotional music and radio ===
Volvoikar was a recognized musical performer for All India Radio. Alongside his theatrical career, he specialized in the art of bhajan. He regularly performed at religious events and festivals throughout Goa, including the Nageshi Bhajani Saptah, Margao Dindi, Vasco Saptah, and Shravan Monday events at the Shri Damodar Hall in Margao, as well as performances at Ramnathi and in regions such as Panaji, Divar, Cumbarjua, Marcel, Borim, Shiroda, Curchorem, and Quepem.

He conducted bhajan classes for aspiring rural performers. Together with Manoharbuva Shirgaonkar, he established a distinct bhajan tradition in Goa.

== Awards and accolades ==
Volvoikar has won multiple awards:

- Akhil Bharatiya Konkani Sahitya Parishad: Honored at the 18th session in Ramnathi (1990).
- Goa State Award for Folk Art: Awarded by the Government of Goa (1991–1992).
- Gomantak Marathi Academy: Conferred with honorary membership (1992).
- Other recognitions: Received felicitations from the Goa Sanskritik Mandal, Samrat Sangeet Sammelan, Girijabai Kelkar Sangeet Sammelan, and The Goa Hindu Association, alongside a senior artist honorarium from the government.

== Personal life ==
Volvoikar died on 15 May 1994 in Bandora, Goa. His son, Prasad Volvoikar, is also active in the fields of acting and music.
