= Mormugao Port =

Port in Goa, India

- Interactive map of Mormugao Port

Location
- Country: India
- Location: Mormugao, Goa
- Coordinates: 15°24′32″N 73°48′04″E
- UN/LOCODE: INMRM

Details
- Opened: 1885
- Operated by: Mormugao Port Authority
- Owned by: Government of India
- Size: 450m, draft of 14.1m
- No. of berths: 11
- Employees: 2600

Statistics
- Website www.mptgoa.gov.in

Mormugao Port is a port on the western coast of India, in the coastal state of Goa. Commissioned in 1885 on the site of a natural harbour, it is one of India's oldest ports. The port employs around 2,600 employees and has about 4,000 pensioners.

The Mormugao Port Authority (MPA), which operates the port, is the largest employer in the Vasco region and has a complete mini-township in Headland Sada which includes schools, residential complexes and amenities (like a hospital) for employees of the Port. It was renamed from 'Mormugao Port Trust' to 'Mormugao Port Authority' in 2022.

== Location ==
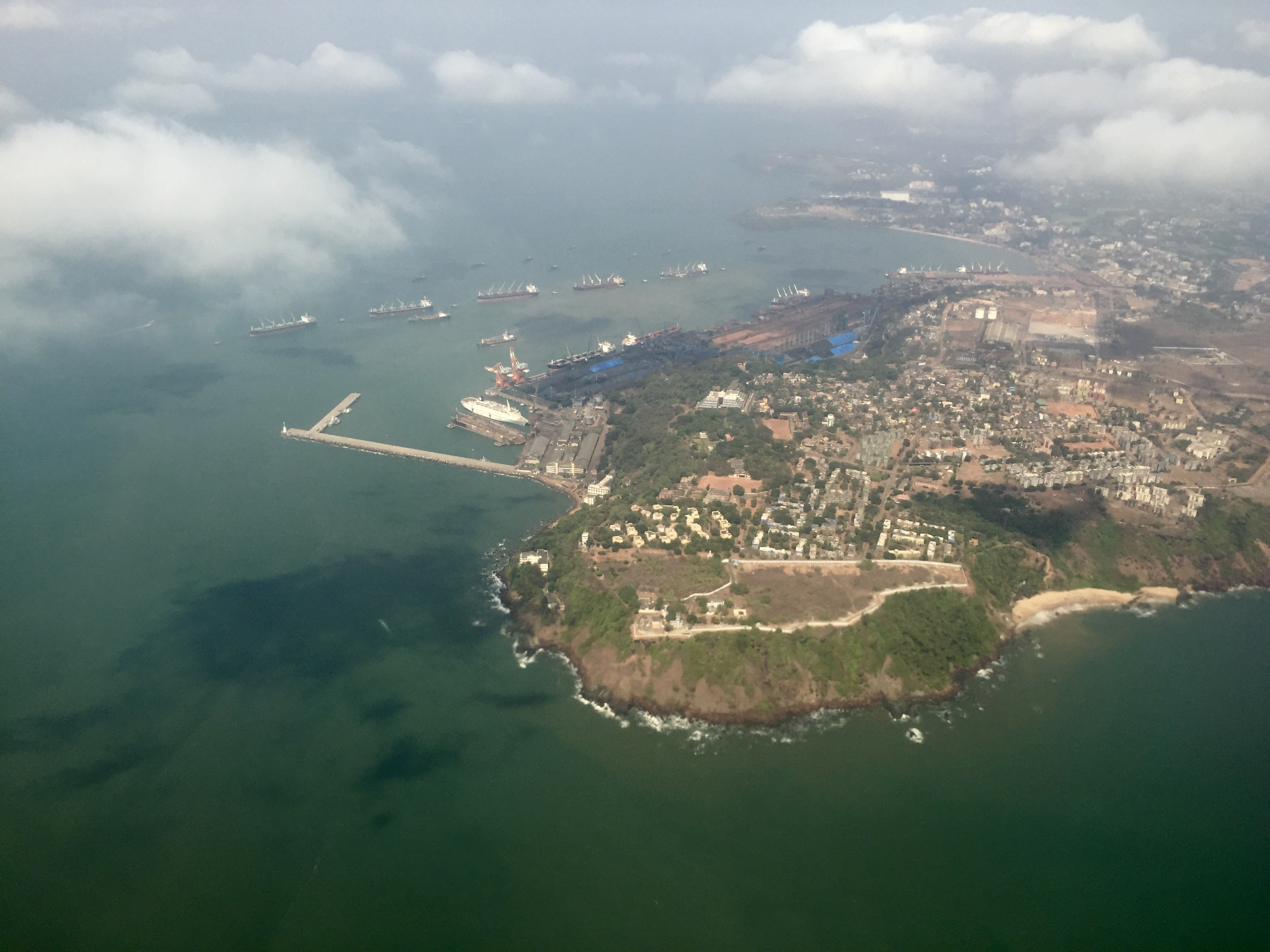
Aerial view of Mormugao Harbour

Mormugao Port is located in the town of Mormugao, Goa, India. It has a naturally protected open-type harbour, that lies on the southern part of the mouth of the river Zuari. This harbour is also protected using a breakwater and a mole that was built from the outer end of the breakwater and runs parallel to the wharf.

== History ==
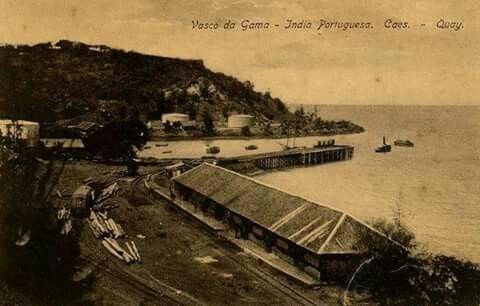
Mormugao port c. 1890s

In the 19th century, Portuguese India and British India decided to join forces to improve maritime trade, under the Anglo-Portuguese Treaty of 1878. Mormugao was identified as having one of the best natural harbours, and a metre-gauge railway line was constructed to connect it. The work of modernising the port and laying the metre-gauge railway was undertaken by a British company, ‘The Western Indian Portuguese Guaranteed Railway Company’. This company was founded in Britain exclusively for this purpose. The Portuguese paid a huge sum for the project, and even paid for the registration of this company in England. Work began in 1878. The harbour was commissioned in 1885, and the railway line (running till Sanvordem, and later to Castle Rock) was inaugurated in 1887. The first ship to sail into Mormugao Port was the SS Westbourne, which brought railway equipment, in April 1885.

During World War II, Mormugao Harbour was the site of Operation Creek, which resulted in the bombing of a German merchant ship, Ehrenfels, which had secretly been transmitting information to U-boats. In 2017, MPA announced that it would salvage the remnants of the ship, as they were hindering the progress in a project of setting up a fishing harbour.

The port was recognised as a major port in 1963 under the Major Port Trusts Act, 1963, shortly after the Indian annexation of Goa.

== Transport links ==
The port is connected by its own railway line, with the erstwhile Marmagao railway station situated in its compound. It is thus connected to Maharashtra and Karnataka hinterlands via South Western Railways and Konkan Railways. MPT is connected by road by the National Highway 17A. There is a plan to connect it with a four-lane highway to the National Highway 17B, which was scheduled to be completed in October 2018. Ore mined in interior regions of Goa and Karnataka is brought to MPA by barges navigating the rivers Mandovi and Zuari.

== Facilities ==
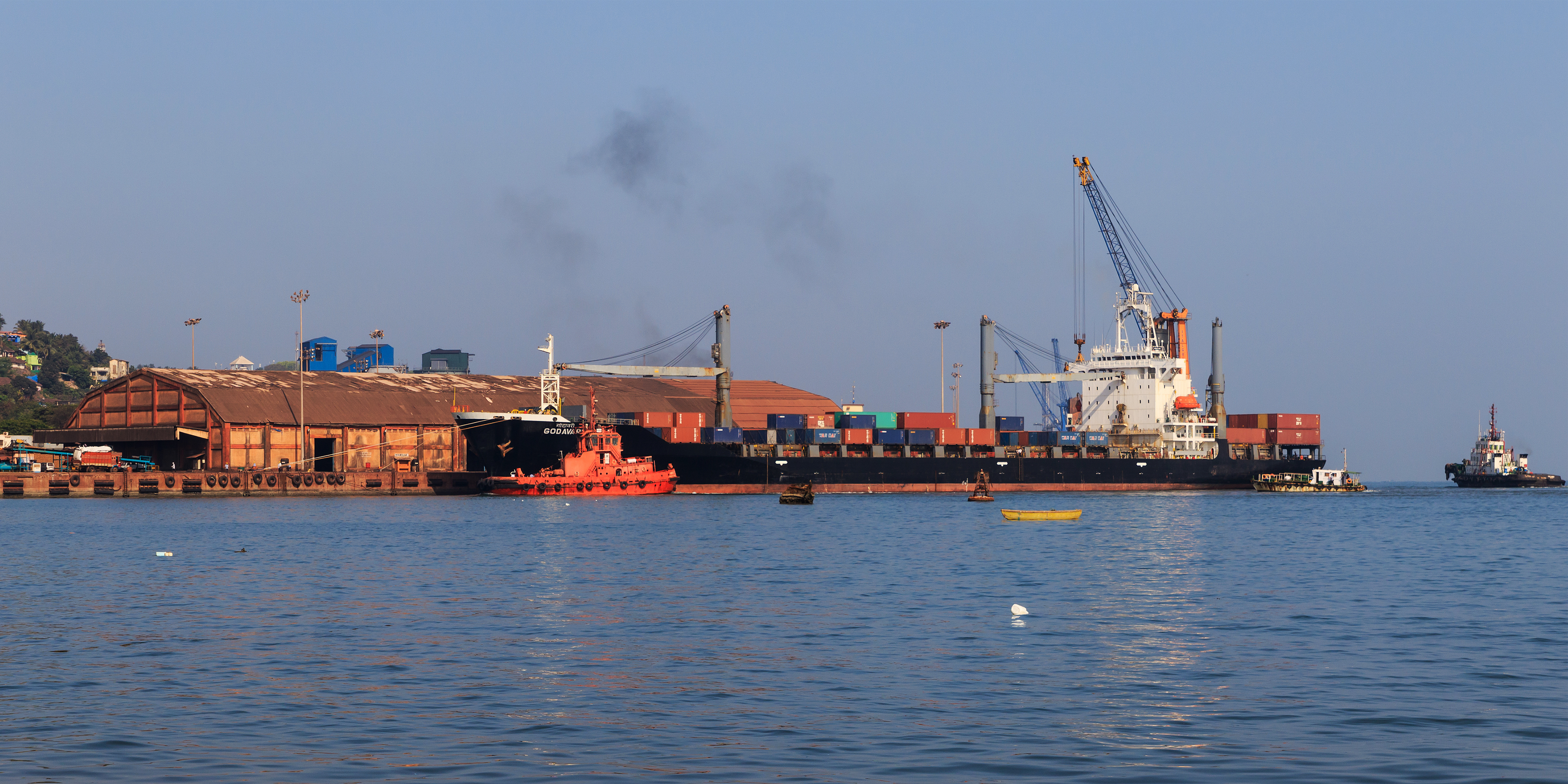
View of Mormugao Harbour from the Zuari river

MPT has berths for coal and iron ore. It also has a berth for cruise ships and even has a dedicated Cruise Terminal building, and hosts a variety of cruise ships the year-round. It plans to expand with a dedicated multipurpose cargo berth, a general cargo berth project (to replace the ship repair yard), and dedicated berths for Navy and Coast Guard.

Ore brought via barges is either collected to be loaded onto bulk carrier ships or directly loaded onto the ships using trans-shippers. Ore which is collected on the port is handled by machinery called MOHP (Mechanical Ore-Handling Plant). This includes massive bucket wheel loaders and miles of conveyor belts. MPT's MOHP has now been converted to a general cargo handling berth.

Adani Ports & SEZ Limited has a one-berth terminal (Berth 7) at MPA. It has a capacity of 7 MMT cargo. It can handle coal cargo, Panamax and capesize vessels. Its main feature is a mechanized material handling system of conveyor systems and stacker cum reclaimers. This system has a stacking capacity of 5000 TPH and reclaiming capacity of 2500 TPH. Jindal South West Port Ltd has two berths, and berths 8 and 9 are currently run by Vedanta. They all mainly handle coal.

== Types of cargo ==
MPA briefly became the leading iron ore exporting port in India, with about 54.50 million metric tonnes (MMT) of iron ore traffic in 2010–11 (about 90% of this was exported to China). Subsequently, the port's cargo volume dropped to 39 MMT in 2011-12, with iron ore accounting for 29.21 MMT, due to a global reduction in demand for iron ore.

Berth numbers 10 and 11 of MPA are dedicated to coal handling. MPT also exports managanese and bauxite.

In 1992, berth numbers 1, 2 and 3 were decommissioned and given to Western India Shipyard Ltd. for the creation of a modern ship repair facility equipped with a floating dry dock. Berth no. 7 is a shallow drafted berth meant for shipment of coastal cargo (now given to Adani).

Ships carrying naphtha, ammonium or phosphorus unload at MPA, and this is transported to Zuari Indian Oil Tanking Ltd (ZIOL), located in Zuarinagar, via tankers and pipelines. A leakage in one such pipeline caused the naphtha fire incidents of 2011.

As of 2014, MPA's main exports were frozen fish, liquor, iron casting, pig iron and pharmaceutical products, while its main imports were of heavy melting scrap, shredded scrap, potassium carbonate and steel turning.

== Philanthropy ==
MPA Education Society runs three schools at the Primary, Secondary and Higher Secondary levels, named Deepvihar. MPT also plays a major role in the working of New Dawn Ashadeep School for special children. Both these institutions are located in MPA's mini-township of Headland Sada.

== Awards ==
MPA has won two awards from the Union Ministry of Shipping, for the year 2015-2016: for maximum traffic growth compared to all the major ports of the country, and for having the maximum score for RFD (Result Framework Document) implementation.

== See also ==
- Mormugao
- Dabolim Airport
- Operation Creek
- Mumbai Port Trust
- Vasco da Gama, Goa
