= Sheikh Hassan Haroon =

Indian politician (died 2021)

Shaikh Hassan Haroon
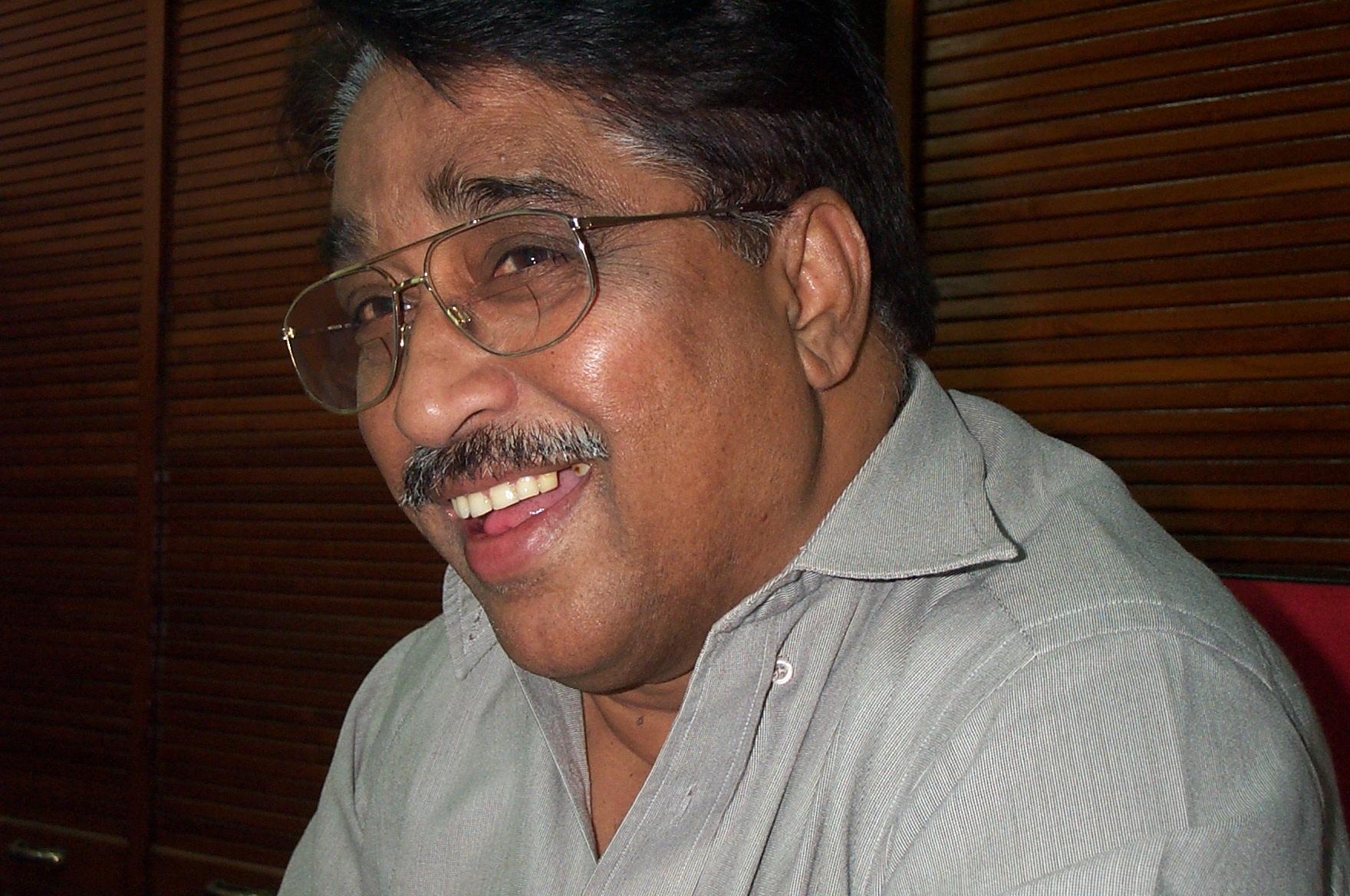
- Sheikh Hassan Haroon in 2001

Industry minister of Goa
- In office 1999–2002

Speaker of the Goa Legislative Assembly
- In office 26 July 1991 – 15 January 1995
- Preceded by: Surendra Sirsat
- Succeeded by: Tomazinho Cardozo

Member of Goa Legislative Assembly
- In office 1999–2002
- Preceded by: John Manuel Vaz
- Succeeded by: Giovanni Karl Vaz
- Constituency: Mormugao
- In office 1977–1994
- Preceded by: Joshi Vassant Subraya
- Succeeded by: John Manuel Vaz
- Constituency: Mormugao

Law and Revenue Minister of Goa
- In office 1984–1989

Personal details
- Party: Indian National Congress; Indian National Congress (Sheik Hassan); Bharatiya Janata Party
- Occupation: Politician

Sheikh Hassan Haroon (died 6 May 2021) was an Indian politician. He was a five term member of the Goa Legislative Assembly representing the Mormugao Assembly constituency.

== Political career ==
Haroon was the Industry minister of Goa from 1999 to 2002 and Speaker of the Goa Legislative Assembly from 1991 to 1995. He was also the Law and Revenue Minister of Goa from 1984 to 1989.

=== Mormugao Assembly Constituency ===
Haroon was a five term member of the Goa Legislative Assembly representing the Mormugao constituency, four terms from 1977 to 1994 and 1999 to 2002.

=== Indian National Congress (Sheik Hassan) ===
After leaving the Indian National Congress Haroon floated his own political party called Indian National Congress (Sheik Hassan) in 2002. Later this party merged with Bharatiya Janata Party.
