= Vasco Saptah =

Hindu festival in Goa, India

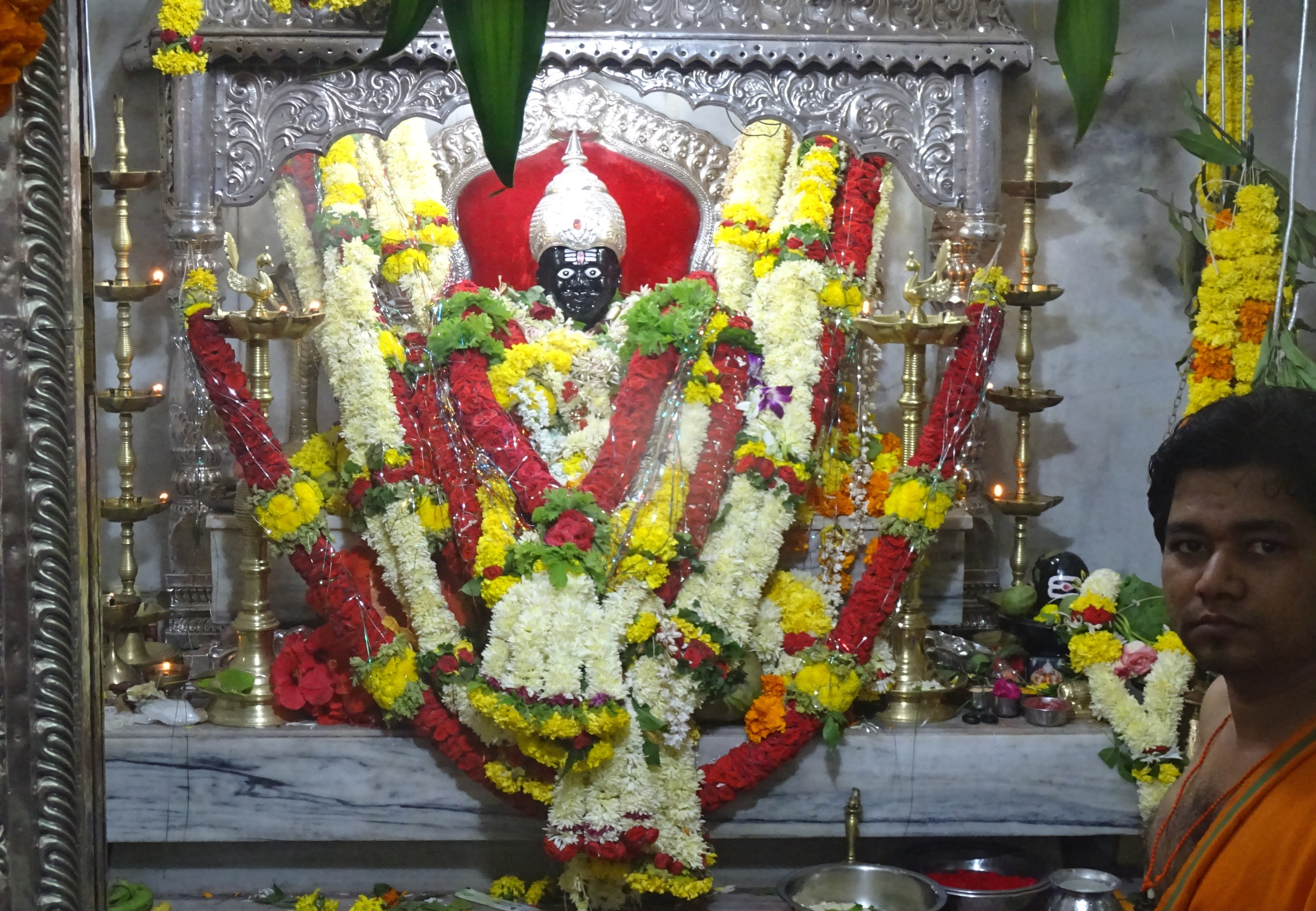
- Lord Damodar at the Damodar Temple during the Vasco Saptah
- Also called: Damodar Bhajani Saptah
- Observed by: Hindus
- Type: Hindu, cultural, Goan
- Significance: Commemoration of the belief that the 1899 epidemic in Vasco was eradicated by the blessings of Lord Damodar
- Date: 6th day of Shravana month of the Hindu calendar
- Duration: 1 week
- Frequency: Annual
- First time: 1899; 127 years ago

The Vasco Saptah (transl. week) or the Damodar Bhajani Saptah is an annual cultural and religious festival celebrated in Vasco da Gama, Goa. It is a week-long celebration that starts on the sixth day of the Shravana month of the Hindu calendar, usually in the month of July or August, that commemorates the belief that an epidemic in 1899 was overcome with the blessings of Lord Damodar, a local incarnation of Lord Shiva.

== History ==
In 1899, an epidemic spread across the city of Vasco da Gama, Portuguese Goa, causing several deaths. Members of some prominent families from the city then travelled to Zambaulim to seek blessings from Lord Damodar (believed to be a local incarnation of Shiva) at Shri Damodar Sansthaan. The temple priest then gave them a shreephal (transl. sacred coconut) as prasada. The shreephal was then placed at the house of the Joshi family, and was worshipped faithfully by the citizens of Vasco, after which it is believed that the epidemic subsided. The Vasco Saptah (transl. week), or the Damodar Bhajani Saptah, is thus celebrated every year to commemorate this.

== Observance and traditions ==
=== Shreephal ceremony ===
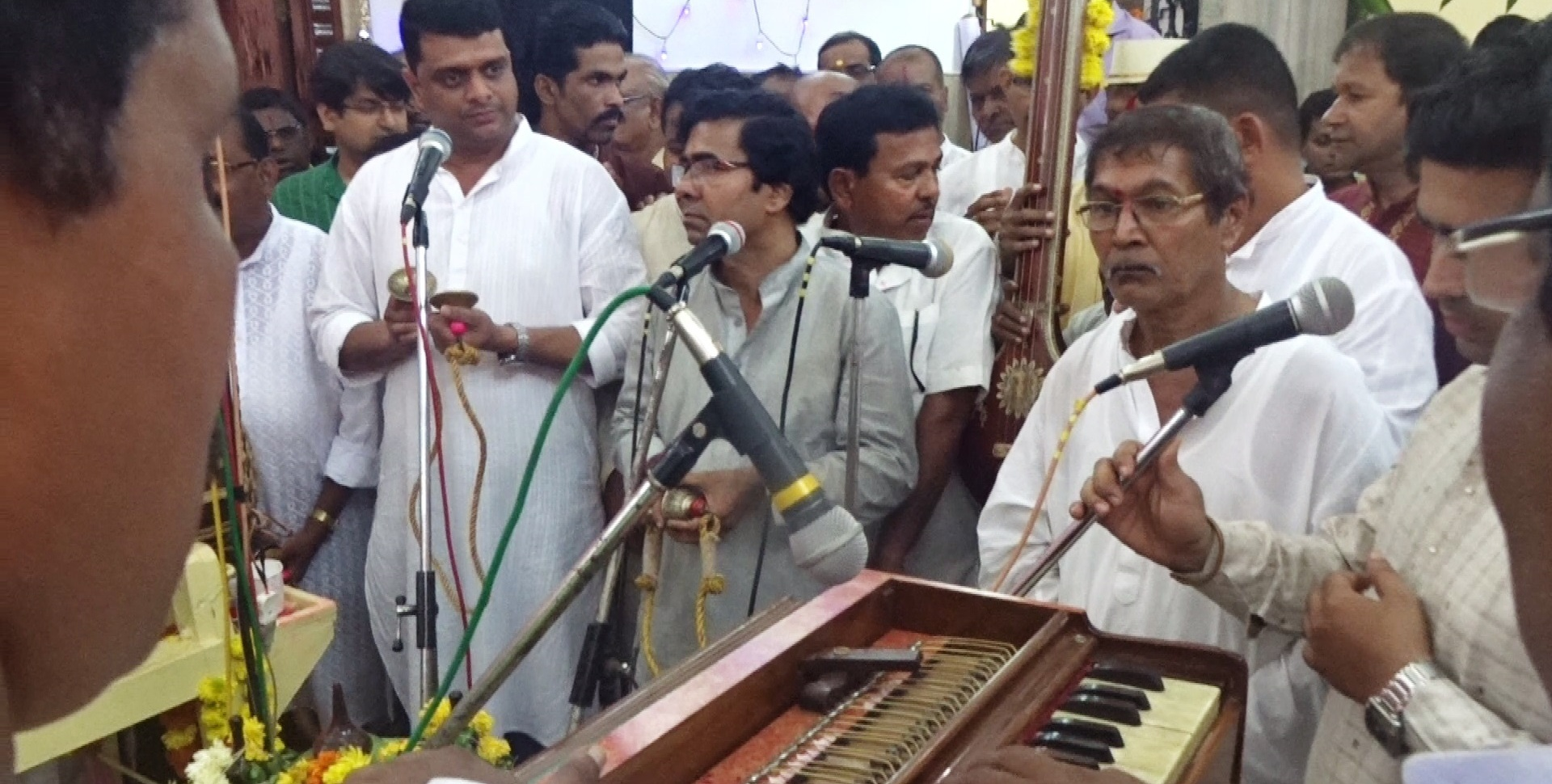
Singing of bhajans at Vasco Saptah

Every year on the sixth day of Shravana month of the Hindu calendar, usually in the month of July or August, a shreephal is brought from the Shri Damodar Sansthaan at Zambaulim and placed in the Damodar Temple at Vasco. The temple is located in the original large hall of the house that belongs to the Joshi family in Vasco. This ceremony, performed at noon, is accompanied with the singing of bhajans for 24 hours.

Since the Joshi family had originally housed the shreephal in 1899, a member of the family usually installs this sacred coconut every year. Until the 2000s, businessman and politician Vasant Joshi from the Joshi family was responsible for this.

=== Cultural performances ===
The festivities in the city continue into the night. Paars, which are tableaux displaying stories from Hindu mythology, are paraded through the roads of Vasco. There also baithaks (entertainment sessions) featuring Indian classical songs held in various parts of Vasco.

=== Immersion of the shreephal ===
After the 24-hour celebration is completed, the shreephal is carried to the beach at Khariwada in Vasco and immersed into the sea.

=== Fair ===
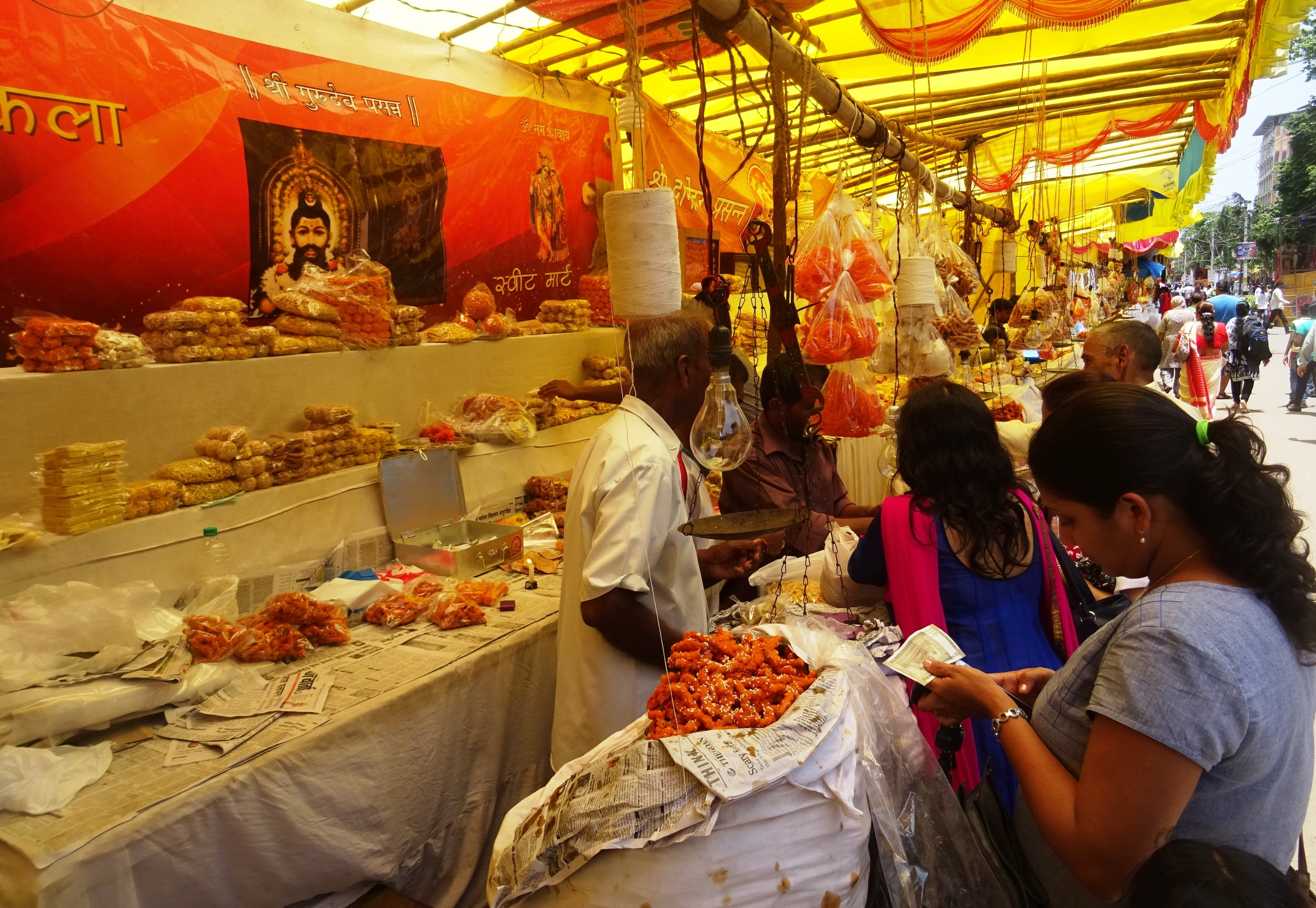
Stall selling local sweets at Vasco Saptah

During Saptah, a huge fair is held for about seven days in Vasco. This is an important shopping festival, selling items of necessity for the citizens of Vasco. Some examples of items sold include steel and brass utensils, grinding stones for spices, kitchenware and furniture. The fair also has people selling items of Chitari art. Other stalls sell local sweets such as kaddeo boddeo.

== Local belief ==
Locals in Vasco believe that Lord Damodar has since protected the citizens from multiple epidemics in the city, including the 2006 chikungunya epidemic, the 2019 dengue epidemic and the COVID-19 pandemic in India.

== 125th edition ==
The 125th edition of the festival was celebrated in 2024. It was marked by grand celebrations, unlike the smaller celebrations of the previous few years, due to the restrictions of the COVID-19 pandemic lockdown in India. The Saptah committee also released a special logo for the festival, that was available as souvenirs.
