= Indian National Congress (Sheikh Hassan) =

Indian political party in Goa formed in 2002

Indian National Congress (Sheikh Hassan) was a group of politicians from Goa which broke away from the Opposition Indian National Congress on 17 August 2002.

This group was led by the former Speaker of the Goa assembly, Haji Sheikh Hassan Haroon. Five members of the legislative assembly joined the split. The new party declared its support to the then Bharatiya Janata Party (BJP)-Goa People's Congress government. However, four of the MLAs quickly deserted Sheikh Hassan and joined the BJP, the dominant partner of the then ruling coalition, which came to power in Goa mainly by splitting up the Congress and other political parties.

In October 2002 INC(SH) was included in the Government of Goa. Sheikh Hassan was appointed Minister of Industry and Handicraft and his party colleague Prakash Velip was appointed minister of cooperation, official languages, among other portfolios.

In the state elections 2002 Sheikh Hassan Haroon stood as a BJP candidate, and lost. Later, following the anti-Muslim communal riots in Curchorem, Sheikh Hassan moved away from the BJP which was out of power by this time, in early 2006 and cited the Curchorem violence as the reason for doing so. The current status of INC(SH) is unclear.

He died on 7 May 2021 in Goa.

== See also ==
- Indian National Congress breakaway parties
