= National Highway 566 (India) =

National highway in India

National Highway 566
- Map of National Highway 566 in red

Route information
- Length: 12.2 km (7.6 mi)

Major junctions
- From: Ponda
- To: Vasco

Location
- Country: India
- Primary destinations: Verna

Highway system
- Roads in India; Expressways; National; State; Asian
← NH 748	→ NH 366

National Highway 566 (NH 566) is a National Highway in India.
