= Mormugao taluka =

Tehsil in Goa, India

Mormugao Konkani: Murgao Portuguese: Morumugão
- Taluka
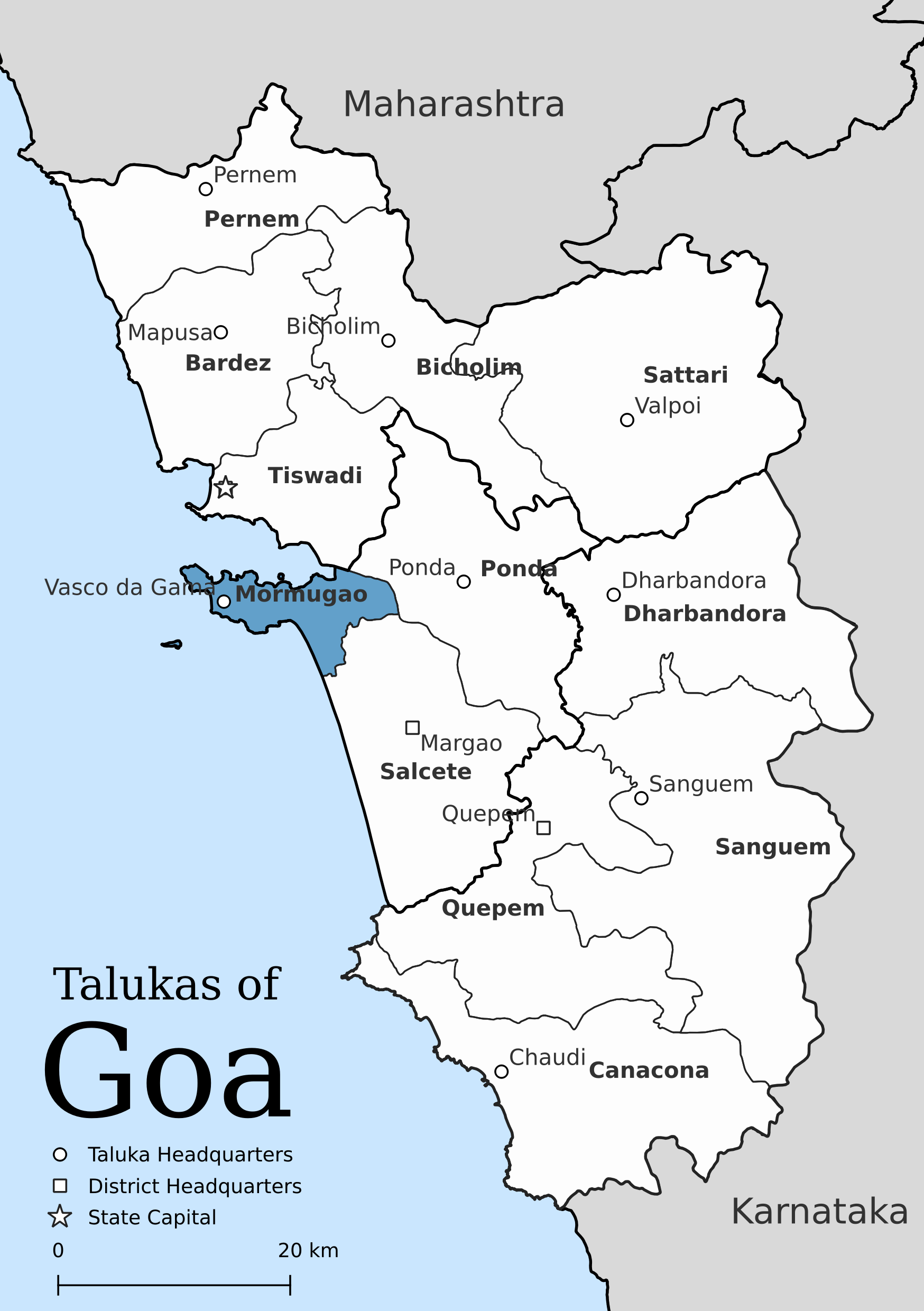
- Location of Mormugao in South Goa district in Goa
- Coordinates: 15.386878°N 73.812971°E
- Country: India
- State: Goa
- District: South Goa
- Headquarters: Vasco da Gama
- Settlements (as of 2011): 1 city 3 towns 10 villages

Government
  - Tehsildar: N/A
  - Lok Sabha constituency: N/A
  - Assembly constituency: N/A
  - MLA: N/A

Population (2011)
  - Taluka: 154,561
  - Urban: 85.62%

Demographics
  - Literacy rate: N/A
  - Sex ratio: N/A
- PIN: 4032XX, 4037XX, 4038XX
- Vehicle registration: GA-06
- Rain: N/A

Mormugao taluka is an administrative subdivision of South Goa district in Goa, India, headquartered at Mormugao city. It is the state's only subdistrict to have all four modes of transport—air, road, rail, and sea.

== History ==
Mormugao was one of the first places to be conquered and incorporated into the Velhas Conquistas of the Portuguese Empire in the East.

== Demographics ==
At the time of the 2011 Census of India, Mormugao had a population of 154,561 with sex ratio of 905 females to 1000 males. Mormugao taluka has an average literacy rate of 89.30%, higher than the national average of 74.04%: male literacy is 93.33% and female literacy is 84.84%. Scheduled Castes and Scheduled Tribes make up 1.66% and 4.44% of the population respectively. 85.62% of the population lives in urban areas.

=== Religion ===
Religion in Mormugao taluka (2011)
| Religion | Percent |
| Hinduism | 64.85% |
| Christianity | 21.54% |
| Islam | 12.76% |
| Other or not stated | 0.85% |

Hinduism is followed by the majority of population of Mormugao taluka. Christians form a significant minority. At the time of the 2011 Census of India 64.85% of the population of the Taluka followed Hinduism, 21.54% Christianity, 12.76% Islam and 0.19% of the population followed other religions or did not state their religious affiliation.

=== Languages ===
Konkani, Hindi and Kannada are among the most commonly spoken languages in Mormugao Taluka.

Languages of Mormugao taluka (2011)
1. Konkani (42.7%)
2. Hindi (16.7%)
3. Kannada (12.4%)
4. Marathi (7.90%)
5. Urdu (6.00%)
6. Malayalam (2.32%)
7. Lambadi (2.31%)
8. Telugu (2.05%)
9. Bhojpuri (1.55%)
10. Bengali (1.07%)
11. Tamil (1.05%)
12. Others (4.02%)

At the time of 2011 Census of India, 42.68% of the population of Mormugao taluka spoke Konkani, 16.68% Hindi, 12.37% Kannada, 7.90% Marathi, 6.00% Urdu, 2.32% Malayalam, 2.31% Lambadi, 2.05% Telugu, 1.55% Bhojpuri, 1.07% Bengali and 1.05% Tamil as their first language.

== Settlements ==
=== City ===
Mormugao taluka has one city: Mormugao-Vasco.

=== Towns ===
Mormugao taluka has three towns: Sancoale, Cortalim, and Chicalim.

=== Villages ===
Mormugao taluka has ten villages: Arossim, Cansaulim, Chicolna, Cuelim, Dabolim, Issorcim, Pale, Quelossim, São Jacinto Island, and Velsao.

=== Islands ===
Mormugao taluka has four islands: Ilha de São Jacinto, Ilha de Pequeno (Bat Island), Ilha Grande, and Ilha de São Jorge.
