= Milind Naik =

Indian politician

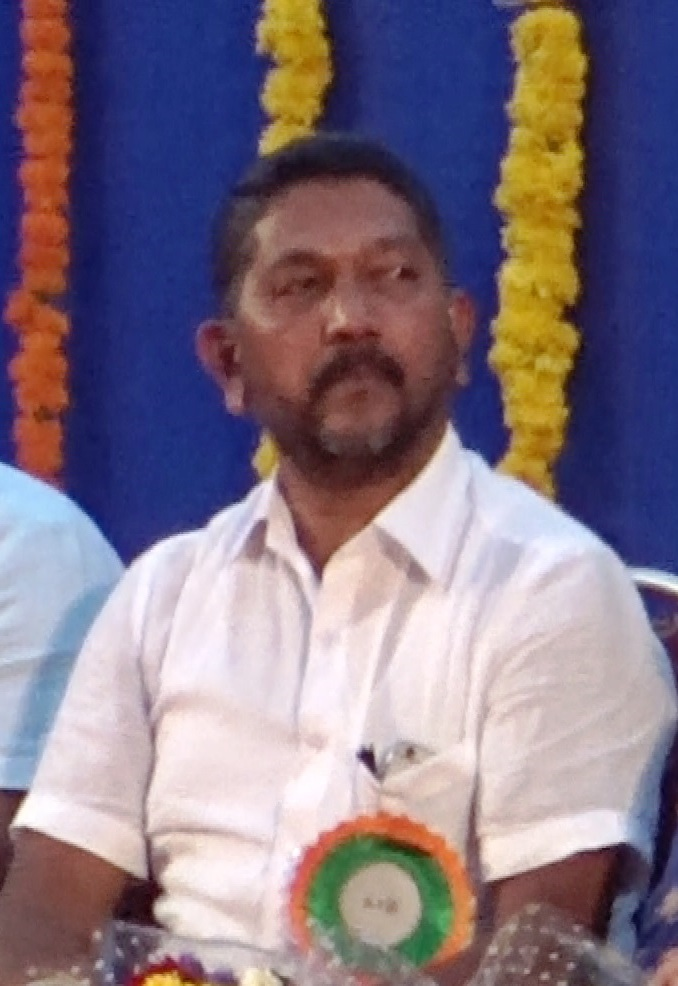
- Naik in 2017

Minister of Urban Development Minister of Social Welfare Minister of Provedoria (Government of Goa)
- In office 24 September 2018 – 2021
- Chief Minister: Manohar Parrikar
- Preceded by: Francis D'Souza
- Constituency: Mormugao

Minister of Power Minister of Non Conventional Energy Minister of Information Technology Minister of Publicity Minister of Legal Metrology Minister of Official Language (Government of Goa)
- In office 15 November 2014 – 14 March 2017
- Chief Minister: Laxmikant Parsekar
- Constituency: Mormugao

Member of the Goa Legislative Assembly
- In office 2007–2022
- Constituency: Mormugao

Personal details
- Party: Bharatiya Janata Party
- Occupation: Politician

Milind Naik is an Indian politician from the state of Goa. He was a member of the Goa Legislative Assembly representing the Mormugao constituency.

== Ministry ==
He was a minister in the Laxmikant Parsekar led government in Goa.

== Portfolios ==
- Urban Development
- Social Welfare
- Provedoria

== Controversies ==
Milind Naik was not in favour of a lockdown in July 2020, while Mormugaon town city council, local businesses, market committees as well as other BJP MLAs appealed for a voluntary lockdown. It has been reported that allegedly, the lockdown has not been imposed in order to allow the transportation of coal and other minerals from Mormugao Port Trust.
