= National Highway 366 (India) =

National highway in India

National Highway 366
- Map of National Highway 366 in red

Route information
- Length: 10 km (6.2 mi)

Major junctions
- From: Cortalim
- To: Mormugao

Location
- Country: India
- Primary destinations: Vasco

Highway system
- Roads in India; Expressways; National; State; Asian
← NH 66	→ NH 366

National Highway 366 (NH 366) is a National Highway in India.
