= Mormugao Assembly constituency =

Legislative Assembly constituency in Goa State, India

Coordinates: 15.39°N 73.82°E

Mormugao
- Constituency No. 24 for the Goa Legislative Assembly

Constituency details
- Country: India
- Region: Western India
- State: Goa
- District: South Goa
- Lok Sabha constituency: South Goa
- Established: 1963
- Total electors: 20,418
- Reservation: None

Member of Legislative Assembly
- 8th Goa Legislative Assembly
- Incumbent Sankalp Amonkar
- Party: Bharatiya Janata Party

Mormugao Assembly constituency is one of the 40 Goa Legislative Assembly constituencies of the state of Goa in southern India. Mormugao is also one of the 20 constituencies falling under South Goa Lok Sabha constituency. This constituency is the least populated constituency of Goa.

== Members of Legislative Assembly ==
Year	Member	Party
1963	Urminda Mascarenhas	United Goans Party
1967	Gajanan Patil	Maharashtrawadi Gomantak Party
1972	Vasant Joshi	Maharashtrawadi Gomantak Party
1977	Sheikh Hassan Haroon	Indian National Congress
1980	Sheikh Hassan Haroon	Indian National Congress
1984	Sheikh Hassan Haroon	Indian National Congress
1989	Sheikh Hassan Haroon	Indian National Congress
1994	John Manuel Vaz	Independent
1999	Sheikh Hassan Haroon	Indian National Congress
2002	Giovanni Vaz	Indian National Congress
2007	Milind Naik	Bharatiya Janata Party
2012	Milind Naik	Bharatiya Janata Party
2017	Milind Naik	Bharatiya Janata Party
2022	Sankalp Amonkar (Note: Elected as Indian National Congress. Switched to BJP in Sept 2022)	Indian National Congress

== Election results ==
=== 2027 Assembly election ===
2027 Goa Legislative Assembly election: Mormugao
Party	Candidate	Votes	%	±%
INC				
NDA				
NOTA	None of the above			
Majority				
Turnout				
gain from		Swing		

=== Assembly Election 2022 ===
2022 Goa Legislative Assembly election : Mormugao
Party	Candidate	Votes	%	±%
INC	Sankalp Amonkar	9,067	53.38%	▲5.37
BJP	Milind Naik	7,126	41.95%	▼6.87
AAP	Parashuram Umaji Sonurlekar	159	0.94%	▼0.60
RGP	Paresh Sitaram Toraskar	130	0.77%	New
AITC	Jayesh Kashinath Shetgaonkar	123	0.72%	New
NOTA	None of the Above	107	0.63%	▼0.24
Margin of victory		1,941	11.43%	▲10.62
Turnout		16,985	82.21%	▲2.33
Registered electors		20,418		▼4.79
INC gain from BJP		Swing	▲4.56	

=== Assembly Election 2017 ===
2017 Goa Legislative Assembly election : Mormugao
Party	Candidate	Votes	%	±%
BJP	Milind Naik	8,466	48.82%	▲3.20
INC	Sankalp Amonkar	8,326	48.02%	▲8.00
AAP	Giovanni Karl Vaz	267	1.54%	New
NOTA	None of the Above	151	0.87%	New
Margin of victory		140	0.81%	▼4.81
Turnout		17,340	80.85%	▲0.94
Registered electors		21,446		▲5.40
BJP hold		Swing	▲3.20	

=== Assembly Election 2012 ===
2012 Goa Legislative Assembly election : Mormugao
Party	Candidate	Votes	%	±%
BJP	Milind Naik	7,419	45.63%	▲1.77
INC	Sankalp Amonkar	6,506	40.01%	▲9.74
Independent	Nazir Khan	1,710	10.52%	New
AITC	Jerry Fernandes	346	2.13%	New
Independent	Narayan Ramchandra Kandu	154	0.95%	New
Margin of victory		913	5.62%	▼7.97
Turnout		16,260	79.79%	▲18.68
Registered electors		20,348		▼29.66
BJP hold		Swing	▲1.77	

=== Assembly Election 2007 ===
2007 Goa Legislative Assembly election : Mormugao
Party	Candidate	Votes	%	±%
BJP	Milind Naik	7,769	43.86%	▲15.91
INC	Vaz Giovanni Karl	5,363	30.27%	▼0.63
Save Goa Front	Shaikh Mohamad Eqbal	2,593	14.64%	New
JD(S)	Meti Siddappa	918	5.18%	New
MGP	Sanjay Vasant Satardekar	449	2.53%	▼5.53
Independent	Parulekar Ravindra Vasant	276	1.56%	New
Independent	Yusuf Sheikh	169	0.95%	New
Margin of victory		2,406	13.58%	▲10.63
Turnout		17,715	61.11%	▲6.70
Registered electors		28,930		▲5.18
BJP gain from INC		Swing	▲12.95	

=== Assembly Election 2002 ===
2002 Goa Legislative Assembly election : Mormugao
Party	Candidate	Votes	%	±%
INC	Vaz Giovanni Karl	4,635	30.90%	▲1.26
BJP	Sheikh Hassan Haroon	4,192	27.95%	▲4.73
NCP	Shaikh Iqbal Abdul Rahim	2,503	16.69%	New
Independent	Parab Premanand Parshuram	2,174	14.49%	New
MGP	Naik Prakash Yeshwant	1,210	8.07%	▼3.10
Independent	Habib Venus Latif	152	1.01%	New
Independent	Cardoz Caitan Andrew	130	0.87%	New
Margin of victory		443	2.95%	▼3.47
Turnout		14,999	54.52%	▲2.09
Registered electors		27,505		▼9.43
INC hold		Swing	▲1.26	

=== Assembly Election 1999 ===
1999 Goa Legislative Assembly election : Mormugao
Party	Candidate	Votes	%	±%
INC	Sheikh Hassan Haroon	4,721	29.65%	New
BJP	Kocharekar Archana Kishor	3,698	23.22%	New
Goa Rajiv Congress Party	Vaz John Manuel Henrique	2,187	13.73%	New
UGDP	Shaikh Niazi Hanif	1,913	12.01%	New
MGP	Padmanabh Amonkar	1,778	11.16%	New
SS	Paradkar Shantaram	533	3.35%	New
Independent	Kerkar Tara Govind	488	3.06%	New
Margin of victory		1,023	6.42%	▼6.44
Turnout		15,925	52.43%	▼7.23
Registered electors		30,368		▲0.44
INC gain from Independent		Swing	▼13.95	

=== Assembly Election 1994 ===
1994 Goa Legislative Assembly election : Mormugao
Party	Candidate	Votes	%	±%
Independent	John Manuel Vaz	7,865	43.59%	New
INC	Sheikh Hassan Haroon	5,544	30.73%	
BJP	Lotlikar Shivram Raghuvir	3,236	17.94%	New
BSP	Chalwadi Vishwanath Bhimarao	664	3.68%	New
Margin of victory		2,321	12.86%	▲11.43
Turnout		18,042	58.38%	▲0.76
Registered electors		30,235		▲20.76
Independent gain from INC		Swing	▲7.03	

=== Assembly Election 1989 ===
1989 Goa Legislative Assembly election : Mormugao
Party	Candidate	Votes	%	±%
INC	Sheikh Hassan Haroon	5,394	36.57%	▼13.51
MGP	John Manuel Vaz	5,182	35.13%	New
Independent	Parulekar Ravindra (Baabn) Vasant	3,310	22.44%	New
BJP	Salkar Asha Damodar	222	1.50%	New
CPI	Mandrekar Sitaram Saulo	105	0.71%	New
Margin of victory		212	1.44%	▼26.25
Turnout		14,751	57.50%	▼5.46
Registered electors		25,038		▲25.64
INC hold		Swing	▼13.51	

=== Assembly Election 1984 ===
1984 Goa, Daman and Diu Legislative Assembly election : Mormugao
Party	Candidate	Votes	%	±%
INC	Sheikh Hassan Haroon	6,425	50.08%	New
MGP	Amonkar Padmanabh Hari	2,873	22.39%	New
Independent	Dourado Caetano Eustaquio	1,691	13.18%	New
Independent	Mesquita Wilfered M.	701	4.75%	New
BJP	Salkar Asha Damodar	425	2.88%	New
Independent	Sardessai Anant Balchandra	133	0.90%	New
CPI(M)	Mandrekar Sitaram Savalo	127	0.86%	New
Margin of victory		3,552	27.69%	▲20.27
Turnout		12,830	62.71%	▲7.53
Registered electors		19,929		▲23.72
INC gain from INC(U)		Swing	▲6.20	

=== Assembly Election 1980 ===
1980 Goa, Daman and Diu Legislative Assembly election : Mormugao
Party	Candidate	Votes	%	±%
INC(U)	Sheikh Hassan Haroon	4,018	43.88%	New
MGP	Arolkar Jagannath Keshav	3,339	36.46%	New
Independent	Pandhare Pandurang Sagun	542	5.92%	New
JP	Sardessai Jayvant Balchandra	485	5.30%	New
Independent	Shaik Ibrahim Mohamad	217	2.37%	New
CPI(M)	Pereira Luisa Cerald	176	1.92%	New
Margin of victory		679	7.42%	▼0.11
Turnout		9,157	54.84%	▲4.83
Registered electors		16,108		▼1.63
INC(U) gain from INC		Swing	▲5.65	

=== Assembly Election 1977 ===
1977 Goa, Daman and Diu Legislative Assembly election : Mormugao
Party	Candidate	Votes	%	±%
INC	Sheikh Hassan Haroon	3,256	38.22%	New
MGP	Joshi Vasant Subray	2,615	30.70%	
JP	Sarmalker Anil Anant	1,395	16.38%	New
Independent	Percira Ciano Melquiades	1,138	13.36%	New
Margin of victory		641	7.53%	▲0.23
Turnout		8,518	51.49%	▲1.04
Registered electors		16,375		▼41.44
INC gain from MGP		Swing	▲1.10	

=== Assembly Election 1972 ===
1972 Goa, Daman and Diu Legislative Assembly election : Mormugao
Party	Candidate	Votes	%	±%
MGP	Joshi Vassant Subraya	5,292	37.13%	▼7.13
UGP	A L De Graca Antonio	4,252	29.83%	New
INC	Anthony De Souza	2,816	19.76%	New
CPI(M)	Gerald Pereira	1,475	10.35%	New
ABJS	V Narsoba Arlenkar	86	0.60%	New
Independent	C. K. Ganapathi	82	0.58%	New
Margin of victory		1,040	7.30%	▼5.72
Turnout		14,254	50.08%	▼5.58
Registered electors		27,962		▲25.65
MGP hold		Swing	▼7.13	

=== Assembly Election 1967 ===
1967 Goa, Daman and Diu Legislative Assembly election : Mormugao
Party	Candidate	Votes	%	±%
MGP	Gajanan Patil	5,570	44.26%	New
UGP	M. R. Manuel	3,932	31.24%	New
Independent	F. Machado	960	7.63%	New
Independent	D. Deshpande	661	5.25%	New
Independent	G. Pereira	463	3.68%	New
PSP	A. Tandel	220	1.75%	New
Independent	P. P. Hari	70	0.56%	New
Margin of victory		1,638	13.01%	
Turnout		12,586	54.29%	
Registered electors		22,253		
MGP win (new seat)				

== See also ==
- List of constituencies of the Goa Legislative Assembly
- South Goa district
