= Mormugao =

- City
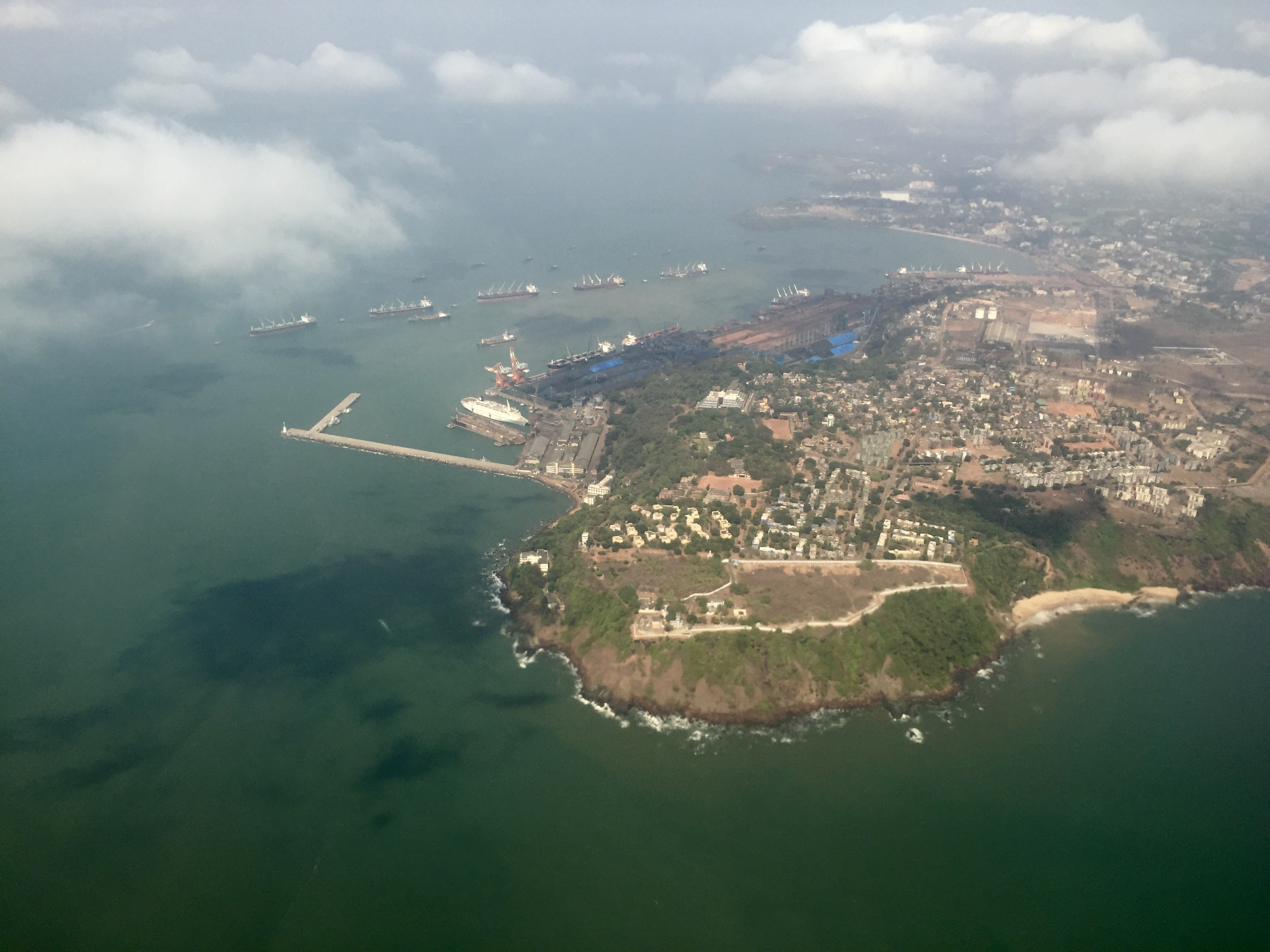
- Aerial view of Mormugao Harbour
- Location of Mormugao in Goa
- Coordinates: 15.40°N 73.80°E
- Country: India
- State: Goa
- District: South Goa
- Taluka: Mormugao taluka

Government
  - Type: Municipality
  - Body: Mormugao Municipal Council
  - chairperson: Girish Borkar

Area
  - Total: 65.62 km^{2} (25.34 sq mi)
- Demonym: Mormuganvcar

Languages
  - Official: Konkani
- Time zone: UTC+5:30 (IST)
- PIN: 403601
- Vehicle registration: GA-06
- Website: www.mmcvasco.com

Mormugao is a port city situated in the eponymous subdistrict of Southern Goa state, India. It has a deep natural harbour and remains Goa's chief port.

Towards the end of the Indo-Portuguese era in 1917, thirty-one settlements were carved out of the Salcette territory, to form Mormugao with Mormugao seaport as its headquarters. The remaining thirty-five settlements were retained in Salcette which encompass the present-day Salcete taluka with Margao as its headquarters.

== Geography ==
Mormugao is located at 15.25°N 73.98°E. It has an average elevation of 2 metres (7 feet).

== Demographics and Healthcare ==
As of 2001 India census, Mormugao had a population of 97,085. Males constitute 53% of the population and females 47%. Mormugao has an average literacy rate of 75%, higher than the national average of 59.5%: male literacy is 80%, and female literacy is 70%. In Mormugão, 11% of the population is under 6 years of age. Konkani being the state language, Marathi, Kannada, Hindi and English are also spoken.

The Directorate of health services Goa (DHS) provides secondary level of healthcare to the people of mormugao and nearby places through the erstwhile Chicalim Cottage Hospital at Alto Chicalim now upgraded to the level of Sub District Hospital with 120 beds. The DHS also provides Primary Health Care to the taluka through PHC Casaulim, PHC Cortalim and UHC Vasco. A number of private nursing homes, clinics, panchkarma centres, gyms and physiotherapy centres can also be found in the subdistrict.

== History ==
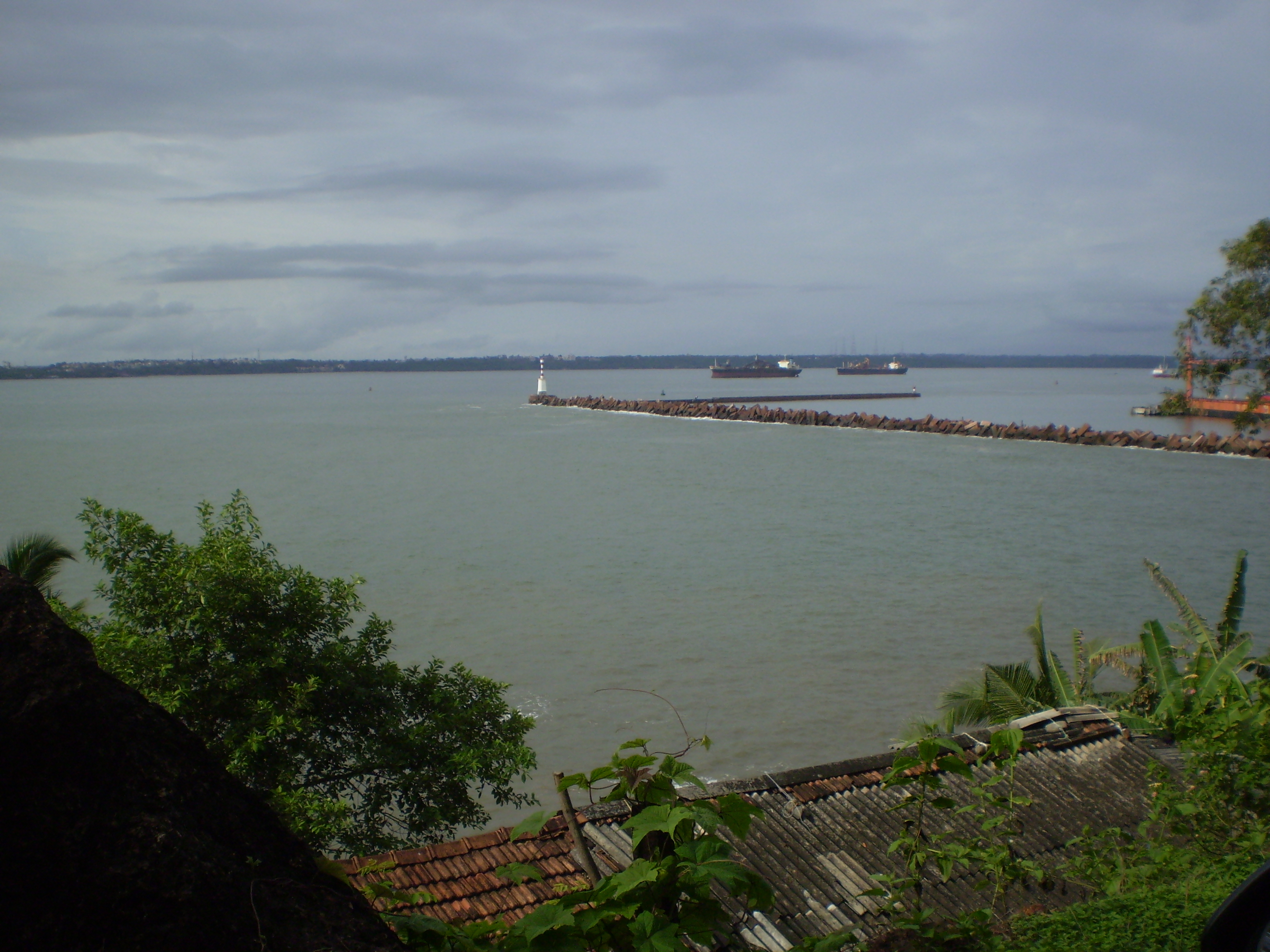
Breakwater at Mormugao Harbour

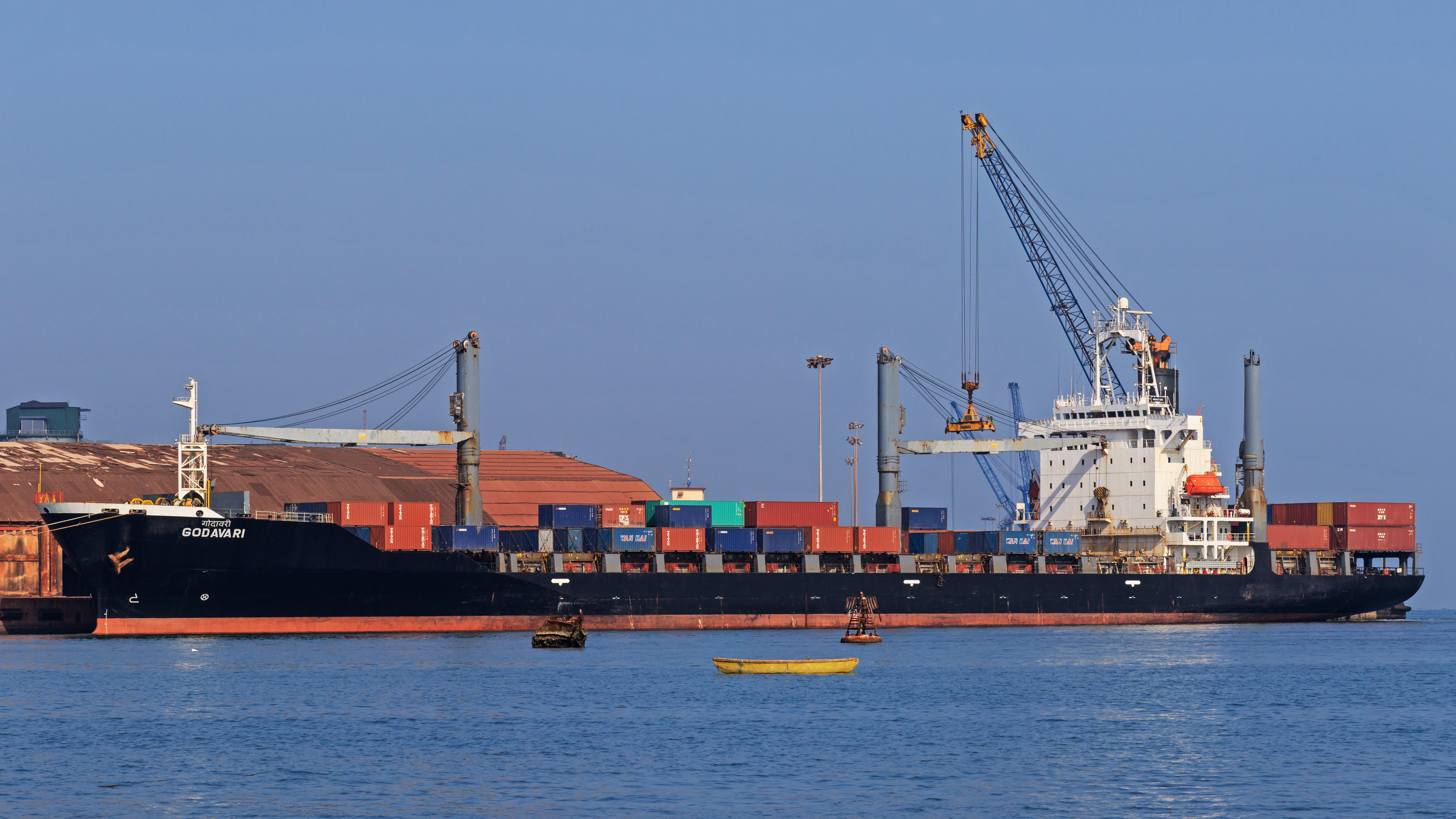
Container ship in Mormugao Harbour

When the Portuguese colonised parts of Goa in the sixteenth century, they based their operations in the central district of Tiswadi, notably in the international emporium 'City of Goa', now Old Goa. As threats to their maritime supremacy increased, they built forts on various hillocks, especially along the coast. In 1624, they began to build their fortified town on the headland overlooking Mormugao harbour.

The sultans of Bijapur, who had ruled Goa before the Portuguese, did not give up easily. There were several invasions. From the sea came the Dutch, who eventually took over from the Portuguese most of the coastal settlements: the Moluccas, Batticaloa, Trincomali, Galle, Malacca, Manar, Jaffna, Quilon, Cochin and Cannanore. From 1640 to 1643, the Dutch tried their best to capture Mormugão but were finally driven away.

In 1683, the Portuguese in Goa were in grave danger from the Marathas. Almost certain defeat was averted when Sambhaji suddenly lifted the siege and rushed to defend his own kingdom from the Mughal Emperor Aurangzeb. The narrow escape, no less than the decline of the City of Goa, convinced the Portuguese viceroy, Dom Francisco de Távora, that he should shift the capital of the Portuguese holdings in India to Mormugao's formidable fortress.

In 1685, the new city's principal edifices were under construction, with the Jesuit priest Father Teotónio Rebelo in charge. The Jesuit architects made a consistent effort to avoid the ornate style of the time. The austere viceregal palace still stands, having been used, after its short stint as a palace, in various capacities, including as a hotel which housed the British agents who in 1943 destroyed German ships anchored in Mormugao's neutral waters. Viceroys after Távora found Mormugao too secluded for their liking. The administrative headquarters were moved to the new city of Panjim, which is still Goa's chief city.

During World War II, the harbour of Mormugao was the site of Operation Creek, which resulted in the bombing of a German merchant ship, Ehrenfels, which had secretly been transmitting information to U-boats.

== Mormugao Port ==
Ever since it was accorded the status of a Major Port in 1963, the Mormugao port has contributed immensely to growth of maritime trade in India. It is the leading iron ore exporting port of India with an annual throughput of around 27.33 million tonnes of iron ore traffic.

The INS Mormugao has been named after the port.

== Transport links ==
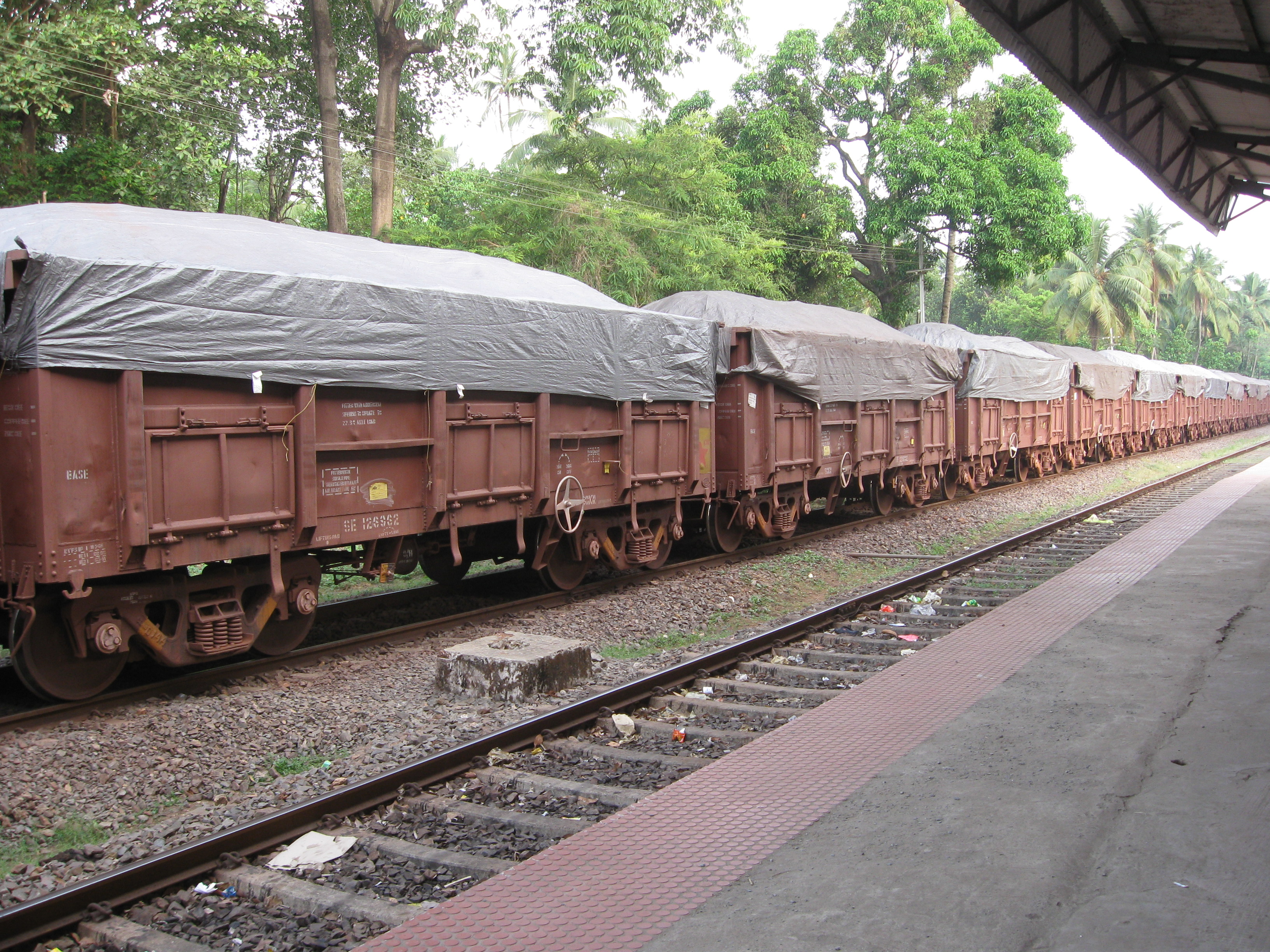
Train carrying Iron Ore to Marmagao Port

Epidemics devastated Mormugao during the eighteenth century, but after that its fortunes turned. As the importance of one of India's best natural harbours grew more apparent, Mormugao, which the British called Marmagoa, became a key trading point. It was chosen for the terminus of the new metre gauge railway linking the Portuguese colony to British India. For a fabulous price, the Western India Portuguese Guaranteed Railways Company, a British enterprise, modernised the port and built the railway. Both were opened to the public in July 1886.

Mormugao's city of Vasco da Gama was planned and built in the early years of the twentieth century. A city of officials, traders and migrant labourers, it had its Portuguese academies and British club life for several decades. Mormugão district continues to be unique in Goa.

Due to the fact that Goa's airport is located at Dabolim, the closest methods of arrival are via the railway terminus at Vasco da Gama, and the port, Mormugao. They are for many visitors’ - their first experience of Goa.

== Politics ==
The area is part of the South Goa (Lok Sabha constituency) (also known as Mormugão (Lok Sabha constituency) ). In the 2019 Lok Sabha elections, the South Goa Lok Sabha constituency was again won by Francisco Sardinha of Indian National Congress defeating Narendra Keshav Sawaikar of Bharatiya Janata Party, though Sawaikar had managed to gain lead in all 4 Lok Sabha constituencies of Mormugao.

Mormugao taluka also elects 4 MLAs to the Goa State Assembly. The current MLAs are Alina Saldanha from Cortalim (Goa Assembly constituency), Carlos Almeida from Vasco Da Gama (Vidhan Sabha constituency), Milind Naik from Mormugao (Goa Assembly constituency) and Mauvin Godinho from Dabolim (Goa Assembly constituency) all from the Bharatiya Janata Party.

The Mormugao Municipal Council comprises 21 wards, each represented by an elected councilor. It operates under the Goa Municipalities Act, 1968, which provides the legal framework for its administration, governance, and delivery of municipal services. The council governs an area of 27.36 km² (10.56 sq mi).

The Mormugao Municipal Council administers civic services through several departments. The Administrative Section manages civil registration and municipal property administration, while the Technical Section oversees building permissions, development works, infrastructure-related no-objection certificates, and the regulation of unauthorized constructions. The Accounts and Taxation Section is responsible for municipal finances, property taxation, trade and business licensing, revenue collection, and the issuance of income certificates. The Stores and Maintenance Section manages solid waste collection operations and the maintenance of the council’s vehicles and equipment.

== Climate ==
Climate data for Mormugao (1991–2020, extremes 1953–2020)
Month	Jan	Feb	Mar	Apr	May	Jun	Jul	Aug	Sep	Oct	Nov	Dec	Year
Record high °C (°F)	36.7 (98.1)	37.8 (100.0)	37.7 (99.9)	37.8 (100.0)	38.4 (101.1)	35.6 (96.1)	32.7 (90.9)	32.5 (90.5)	33.2 (91.8)	36.8 (98.2)	36.7 (98.1)	36.6 (97.9)	38.4 (101.1)
Mean daily maximum °C (°F)	31.8 (89.2)	31.6 (88.9)	32.1 (89.8)	33.1 (91.6)	33.4 (92.1)	30.9 (87.6)	29.3 (84.7)	29.2 (84.6)	30.0 (86.0)	31.6 (88.9)	33.3 (91.9)	32.8 (91.0)	31.6 (88.9)
Mean daily minimum °C (°F)	21.7 (71.1)	22.2 (72.0)	24.2 (75.6)	26.3 (79.3)	27.0 (80.6)	25.2 (77.4)	24.4 (75.9)	24.2 (75.6)	24.2 (75.6)	24.5 (76.1)	23.9 (75.0)	22.2 (72.0)	24.2 (75.6)
Record low °C (°F)	16.7 (62.1)	17.2 (63.0)	17.3 (63.1)	20.6 (69.1)	20.7 (69.3)	17.0 (62.6)	20.2 (68.4)	19.3 (66.7)	21.1 (70.0)	18.3 (64.9)	12.2 (54.0)	17.2 (63.0)	12.2 (54.0)
Average rainfall mm (inches)	0.4 (0.02)	0.0 (0.0)	0.5 (0.02)	5.6 (0.22)	79.4 (3.13)	840.0 (33.07)	885.2 (34.85)	518.2 (20.40)	288.5 (11.36)	156.2 (6.15)	22.4 (0.88)	3.2 (0.13)	2,799.5 (110.22)
Average rainy days	0.2	0.0	0.1	0.3	3.4	20.7	25.8	22.6	14.2	6.7	1.3	0.4	95.7
Average relative humidity (%) (at 17:30 IST)	62	65	69	70	71	83	86	86	83	78	67	61	74
Source: India Meteorological Department

== Education ==
Murgaon Education Society was established in 1971 with the goal of providing educational facilities at Vasco-da-Gama and in other parts of Murgaon Taluka. Mormugao Educational Society's College of Arts and Commerce locally known as MES College is a famous institution situated in Zuarinagar, which provides higher education in Arts and Commerce along with Birla Institute of Science and Technology (BITS) that caters to university level of education in the fields of engineering and medicine.

== See also ==
- Ports in India
- Mormugao Port Trust
