= Vasco da Gama, Goa =

City in Goa, India

Vasco da Gama
- City
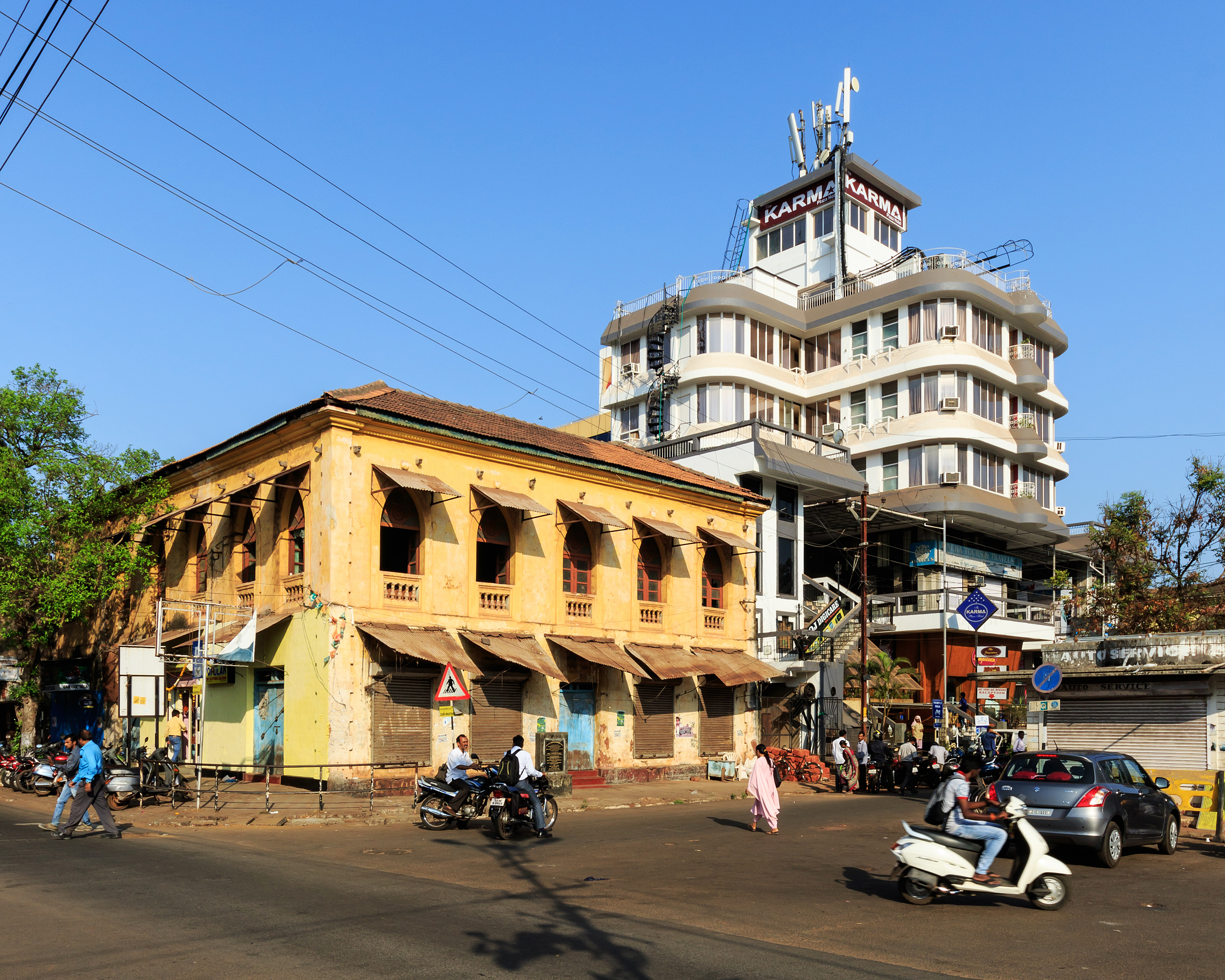
- A view of the city in 2016
- Vasco in Goa
- Coordinates: 15°23′53″N 73°48′40″E
- Country: India
- State: Goa
- District: South Goa
- Sub-district: Mormugao
- Named for: Vasco da Gama

Area
  - Total: 27.36 km^{2} (10.56 sq mi)
- Elevation: 43 m (141 ft)

Population (2011)
  - Total: 94,393
  - Density: 3,450/km^{2} (8,936/sq mi)
- Time zone: UTC+5:30 (IST)
- PIN: 403802
- Area code: 91-832
- Vehicle registration: GA-06
- Official language: Konkani
- Website: mmcvasco.com

Vasco da Gama (/ˌvæskoʊ də ˈɡæmə/, Portuguese: [ˈvaʃku ðɐ ˈɣɐmɐ]), often shortened to Vasco, is a city in the state of Goa on the west coast of India. It is named after the Portuguese explorer Vasco da Gama. It is the headquarters of the Mormugão taluka (subdistrict). The city lies on the western tip of the Mormugao peninsula, at the mouth of the Zuari River, about 30 kilometres (20 mi) from Panaji, Goa's capital, 28 kilometres (17 mi) from Margao, the district headquarters and about 5 kilometres (3 mi) from Dabolim Airport. The city is sometimes also referred to as Sambhaji Nagar after the Maratha king Sambhaji, a decision that has been controversial.

The city was developed along with the nearby Mormugao Port in 1886 and remained with the Portuguese Empire until the 1961 Indian military operation that annexed Goa. The 1888-constructed Mormugao Port remains a busy shipping route in Asia. It is one of the major ports of independent India. The shipbuilding area of Goa Shipyard Limited that builds Indian Navy and Coast Guard vessels was also built there in 1957 (during the Portuguese era). Initially built around the city's harbour as the 'Estaleiros Navais de Goa', the area has, since the end of Portuguese presence, expanded into construction for several other branches of maritime patrol and security. The Indian Navy has an obvious presence here, with its vast campuses and ports, which include the naval base INS Hansa.

== History ==
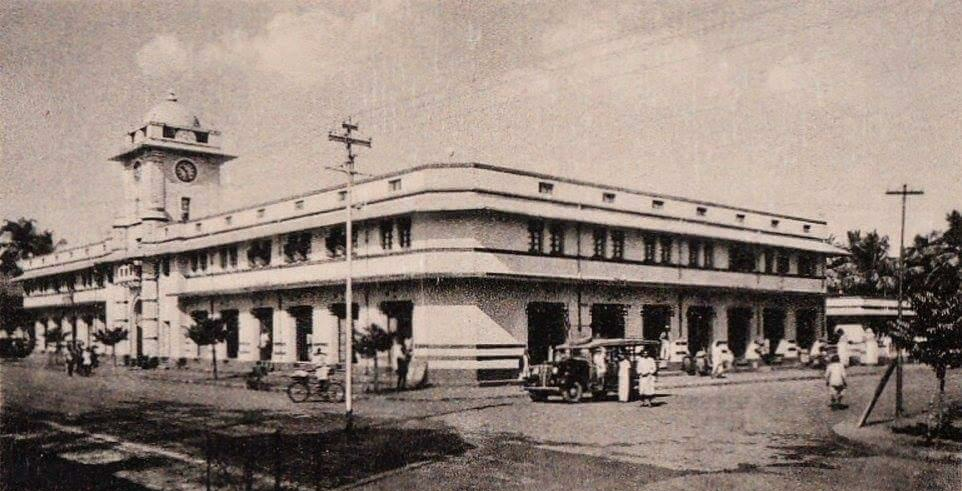
Vasco da Gama Municipal Market in 1958, with the Clock Tower on the left

=== Toponomy ===
The city, in the former Portuguese territory of Goa, is named after the famous Portuguese explorer and navigator Vasco da Gama, who held the title of Governor of Portuguese India. The city was named so by then Governor Ferreira de Amaral in 1886 when the Mormugao Port was being developed.

Vasco da Gama, 1st Count of Vidigueira was the first European to reach India by sea. His initial voyage to India (1497–1499) was the first to link Europe and Asia by an ocean route, connecting the Atlantic and the Indian oceans and, in this way, the West and the East. He reached Goa on 11 September 1524 but died at Kochi three months later. His remains were eventually returned to Portugal and interred at St Jeronimos monastery.

=== Alternate name: Sambhaji Nagar ===
After the Liberation of Goa in 1961, reports suggest that the city was renamed to Sambhaji Nagar, after Sambhaji, in 1971 and this is reflected in a few government records. This has long been cited as a political move by right-wing parties such as the Maharashtrawadi Gomantak Party in the 1960s and the other members of the Sangh Parivar, in 1997 and the Bharatiya Janata Party in 2015. Some sources also claim Sambhaji as the original name of the city, before the Portuguese.

=== Renovation of Clock Tower ===
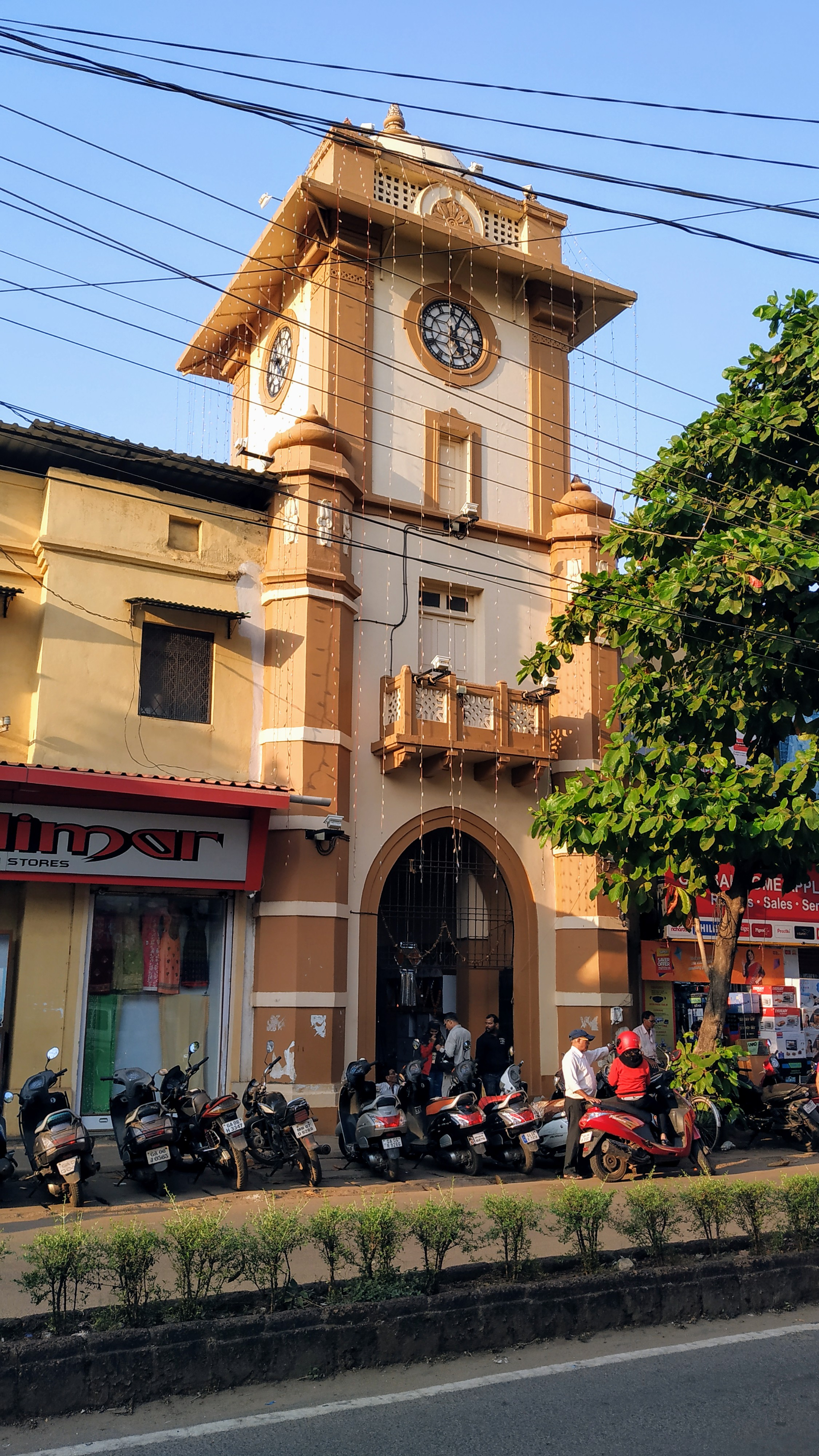
Clock Tower at Vasco da Gama, Goa

In 2015, after a campaign by the Goa Heritage Action Group and the History Lovers Group, the Mormugao Municipal Council (MMC) decided to renovate the clock tower of the municipal market in the heart of the city. Built in 1921, the complex is an example of Art Deco style of architecture. The renovation work was completed in 2017 with funding provided by the Rajaram and Tarabai Bandekar Charitable Trust, and the clock was brought in from Nashik.

== Climate ==
The city has a tropical monsoon climate (Koppen: Am)

Climate data for Vasco da Gama
Month	Jan	Feb	Mar	Apr	May	Jun	Jul	Aug	Sep	Oct	Nov	Dec	Year
Mean daily maximum °C (°F)	31.1 (88.0)	31.2 (88.2)	31.4 (88.5)	32.0 (89.6)	31.6 (88.9)	27.9 (82.2)	26.7 (80.1)	26.7 (80.1)	27.5 (81.5)	29.5 (85.1)	31.3 (88.3)	31.6 (88.9)	29.9 (85.8)
Daily mean °C (°F)	25.4 (77.7)	25.9 (78.6)	27.0 (80.6)	28.4 (83.1)	28.5 (83.3)	26.1 (79.0)	25.2 (77.4)	25.1 (77.2)	25.5 (77.9)	26.5 (79.7)	26.8 (80.2)	26.1 (79.0)	26.4 (79.5)
Mean daily minimum °C (°F)	20.4 (68.7)	20.9 (69.6)	23.0 (73.4)	25.2 (77.4)	26.1 (79.0)	24.9 (76.8)	24.3 (75.7)	23.9 (75.0)	23.9 (75.0)	24.2 (75.6)	23.0 (73.4)	21.5 (70.7)	23.4 (74.2)
Average precipitation mm (inches)	1 (0.0)	0 (0)	5 (0.2)	6 (0.2)	83 (3.3)	718 (28.3)	868 (34.2)	578 (22.8)	272 (10.7)	137 (5.4)	27 (1.1)	5 (0.2)	2,700 (106.4)
Average rainy days	0	0	0	1	6	20	22	21	18	12	3	1	104
Average relative humidity (%)	64	67	74	74	76	89	91	91	89	84	72	63	78
Source: Climate data.org

== Transport ==
Vasco is connected by road by the National Highway 17A and National Highway 17B, by rail by the Vasco da Gama railway station, by the sea through the Mormugao Port and by air through Dabolim Airport, thus serving as the main hub for most tourists visiting the state of Goa.

== Sports ==
As in the rest of Goa, football is the most popular sport in Vasco. Two teams from the town have participated in the I-League – Vasco Sports Club and Salgaocar Sports Club. Salgaocar SC were Champions of the 1998–99 season of the erstwhile NFL. Tilak Maidan is a 6,000-seater football ground located in the city, hosts Indian Super League matches. The stadium sporting a magnificent turf, hosted I-League matches during April 2013 as the home ground for the four teams from Goa in the league, when Fatorda Stadium was closed down for renovation.

Although cricket is not as popular as football, a Vasco resident Shadab Jakati plays for Goa in the Ranji Trophy first-class competition and has also been selected to play for the Chennai Super Kings IPL franchise. Railway Stadium is a cricket ground in Vasco da Gama. The only recorded match held on the ground was a first-class match between Goa and Kerala in the 1986/87 Ranji Trophy, which Kerala won by 6 wickets.

== Politics ==
The city of Vasco falls under the boundaries of the South Goa (Lok Sabha constituency) previously Mormugao Lok Sabha constituency in the Lok Sabha. The current Member of Parliament is Viriato Fernandes of the Indian National Congress.

The extended city of Vasco / Mormugao elects three representatives to the Goa Legislative Assembly:

- Mormugao: The current MLA is Sankalp Amonkar of the BJP.
- Vasco da Gama: The current MLA is Krishna Salkar of the BJP.
- Dabolim: The current MLA is Mauvin Godinho of the BJP.

== Research ==
The National Centre for Antarctic and Ocean Research (NCAOR) located at Headland Sada is a research and development institution administered by the Ministry of Earth Sciences. It is responsible for administering the Indian Antarctic Program and maintains the Indian government's Antarctic research station, Maitri. In addition to laboratories for marine sample processing/analyses, it hosts a special low-temperature ice core sample storage facility. It is also the nodal agency for Indian scientific participation in the deep sea drilling research under the aegis of International Ocean Discovery Program (IODP).

== Education ==
- The Birla Institute of Technology & Science, Pilani started its second campus BITS Pilani Goa Campus at Zuarinagar in Vasco da Gama. The campus offers undergraduate and postgraduate courses in engineering and science.
- The Navy Children School, established in 1987 under the aegis of Naval Education Society, is located in Vasco-da-Gama. It is one of eight similar institutions in India.
- The city has two Kendriya Vidyalayas, established under the aegis of the Indian Navy. Both are located at Mangor Hill in the Varunapuri compound.
- Mormugao Educational Society's College of Arts and Commerce, locally known as MES College, is an institution in Zuarinagar, Vasco-da-Gama which provides training in commerce and the arts.
- Mormugao Port Trust also runs three schools at the Primary, Secondary and Higher Secondary levels named Deepvihar.
- New Dawn Ashadeep School is a special school for the physically disabled.

== Gallery ==
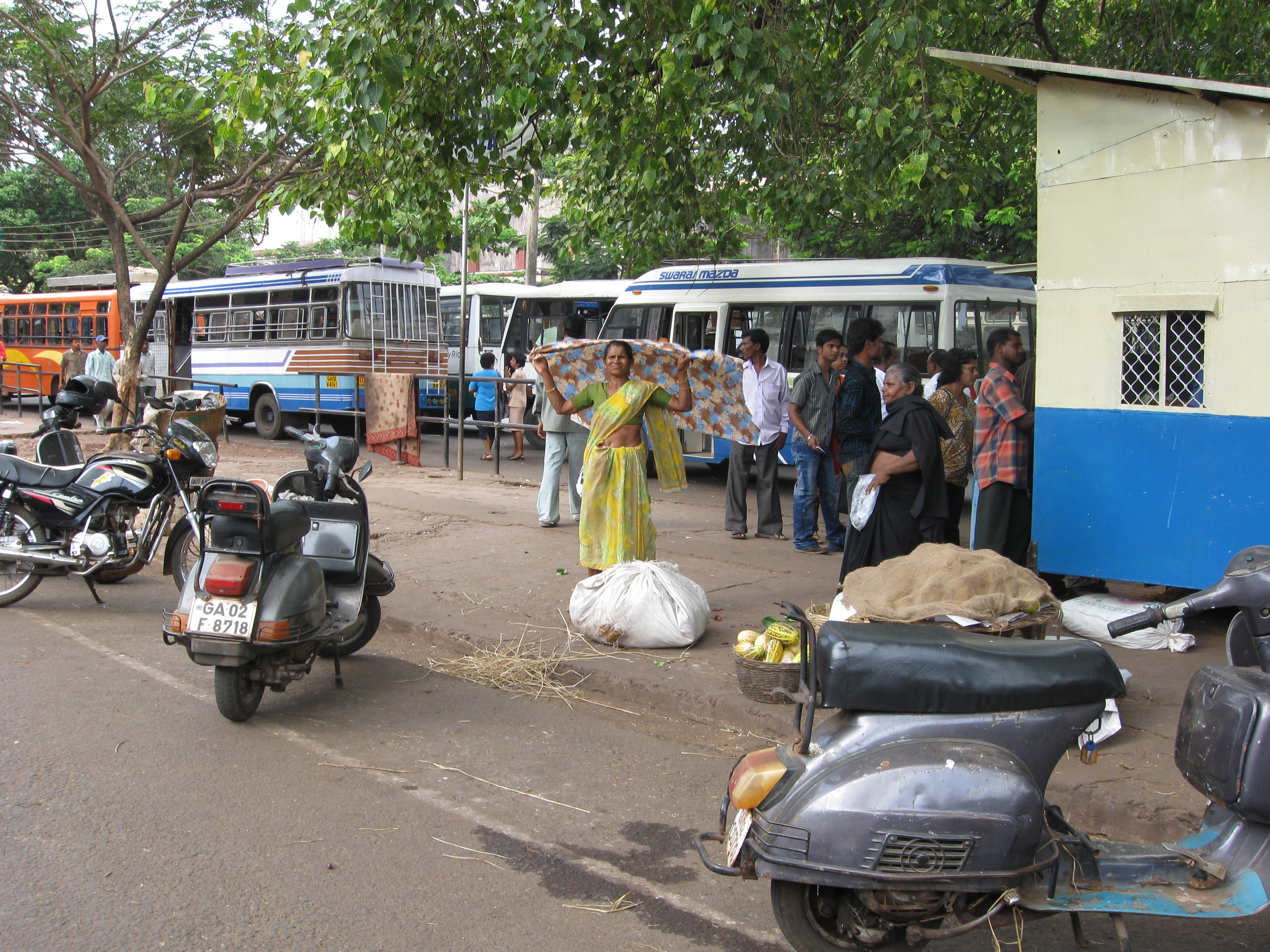
Old Bus station

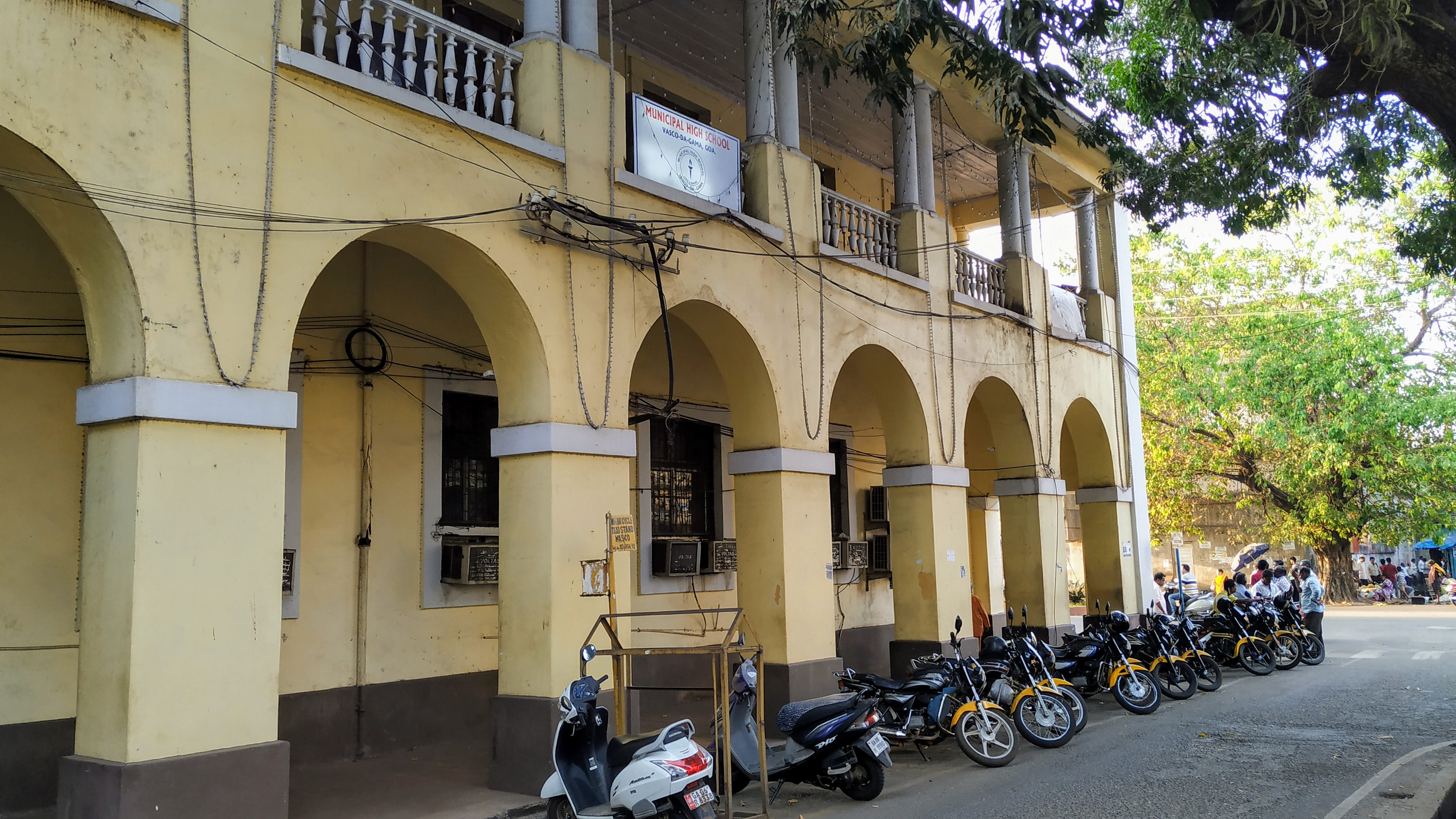
Motorcycle Taxi Stand and Municipal School

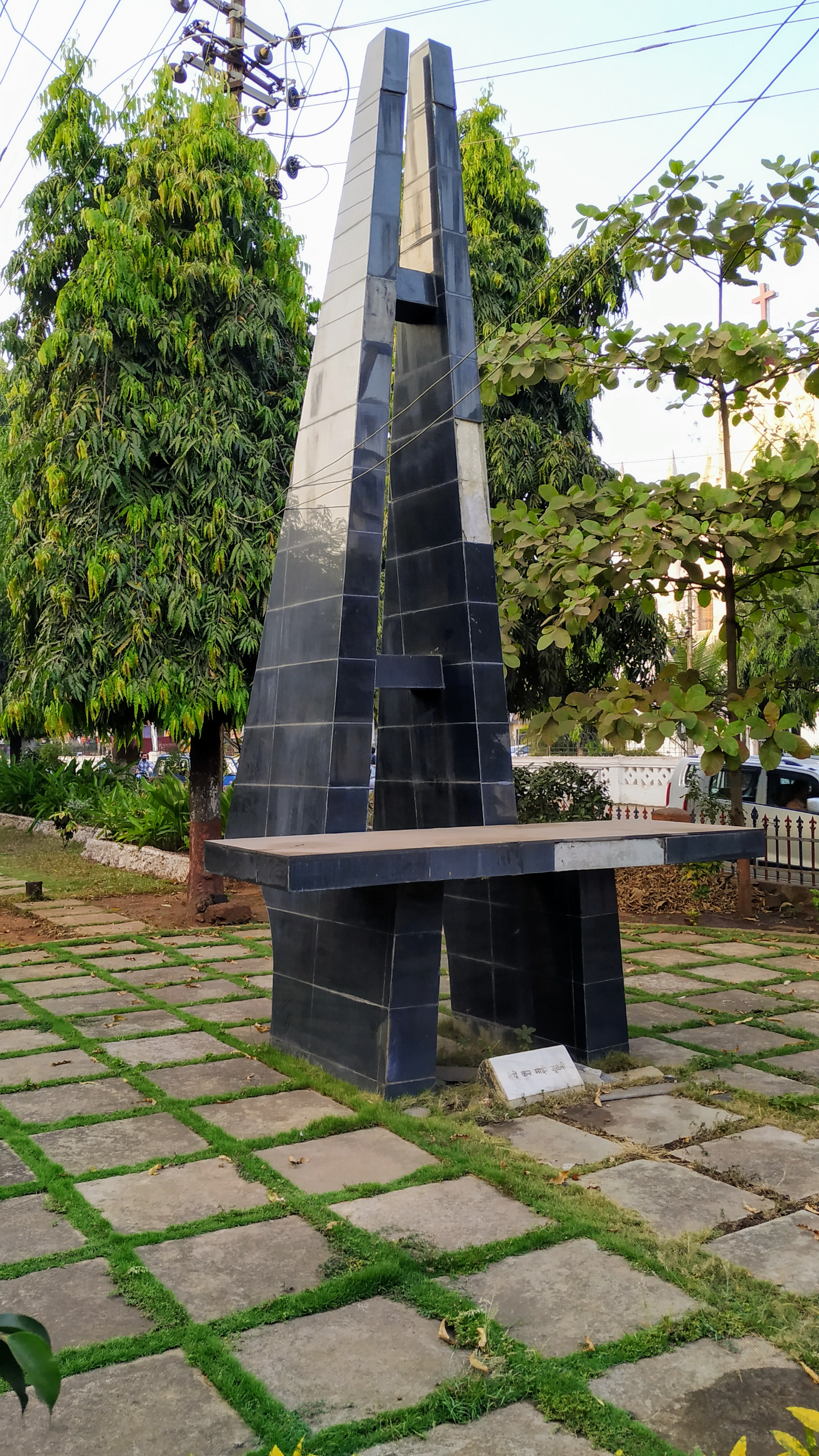
Martyrs Memorial (Hutatma Chowk)

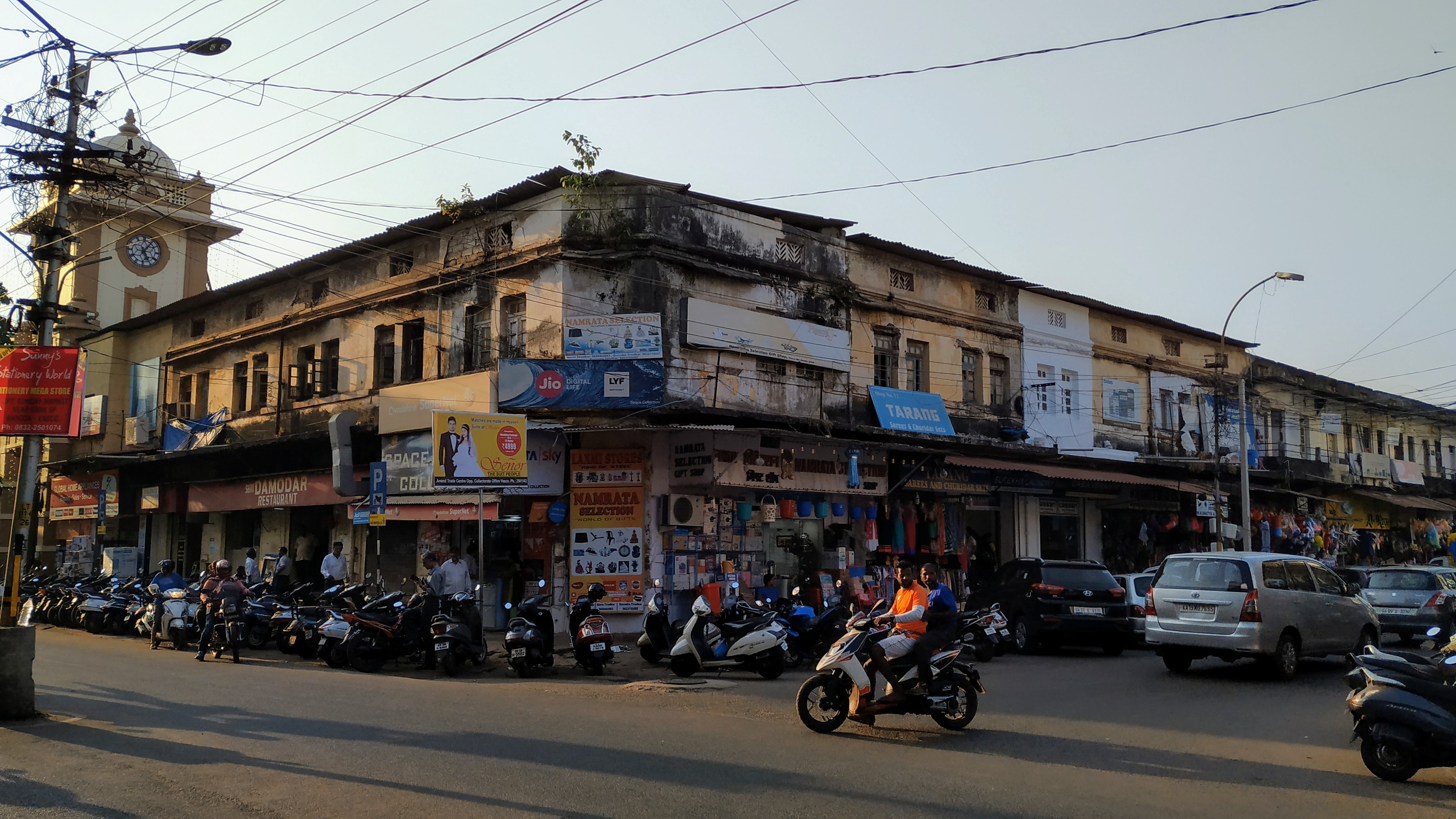
Old Municipal Market

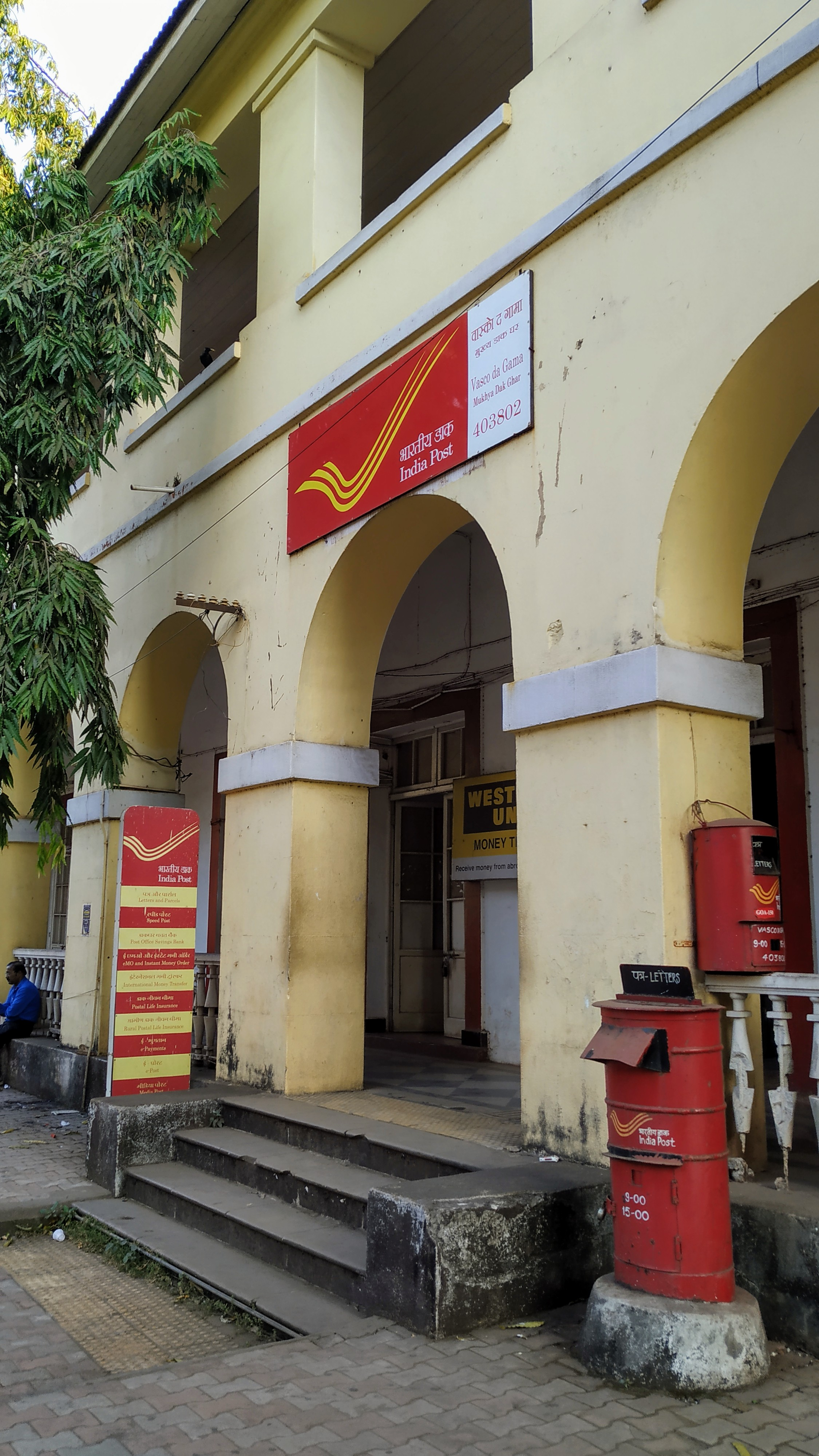
Post Office

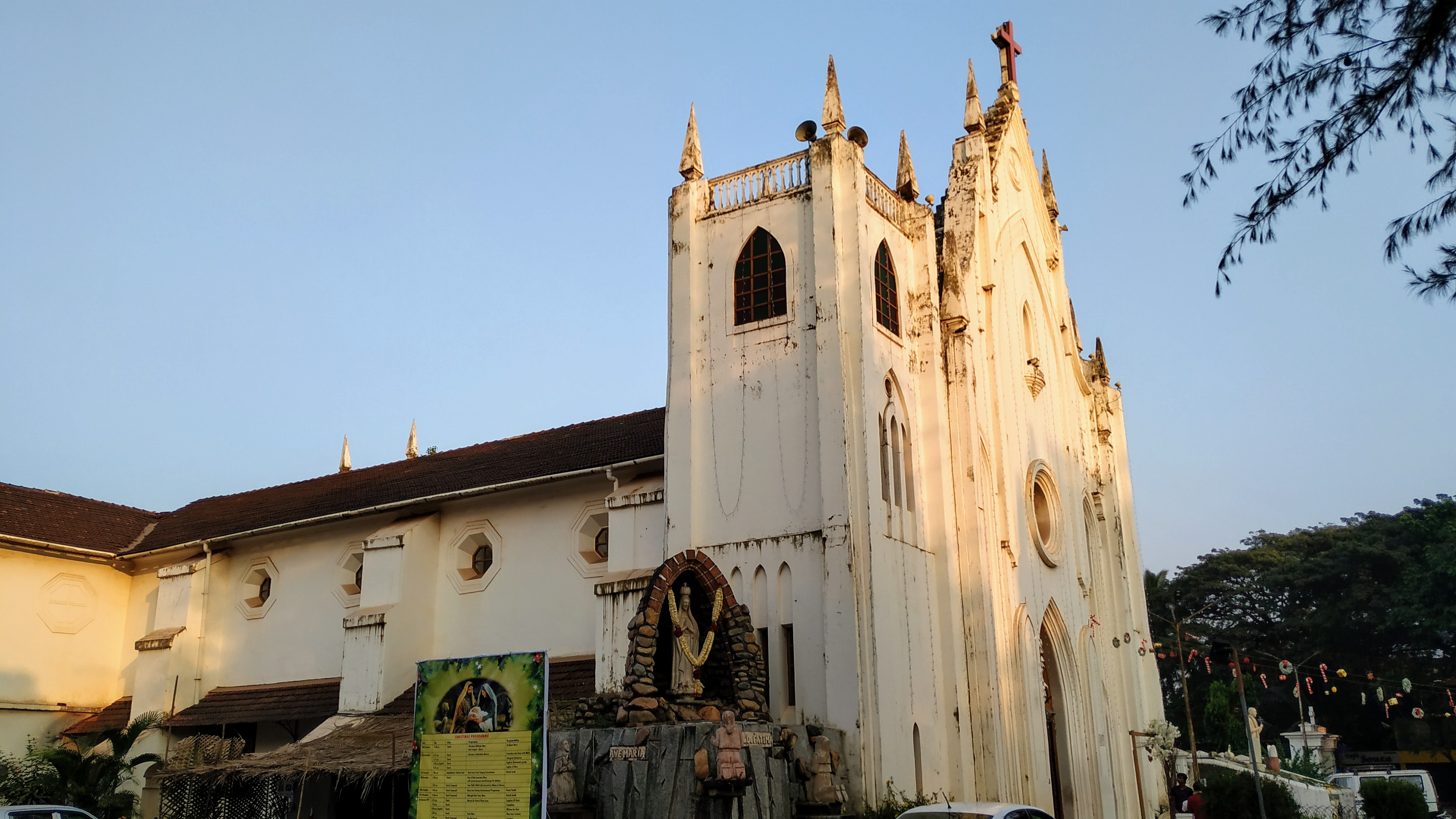
St. Andrew's Church

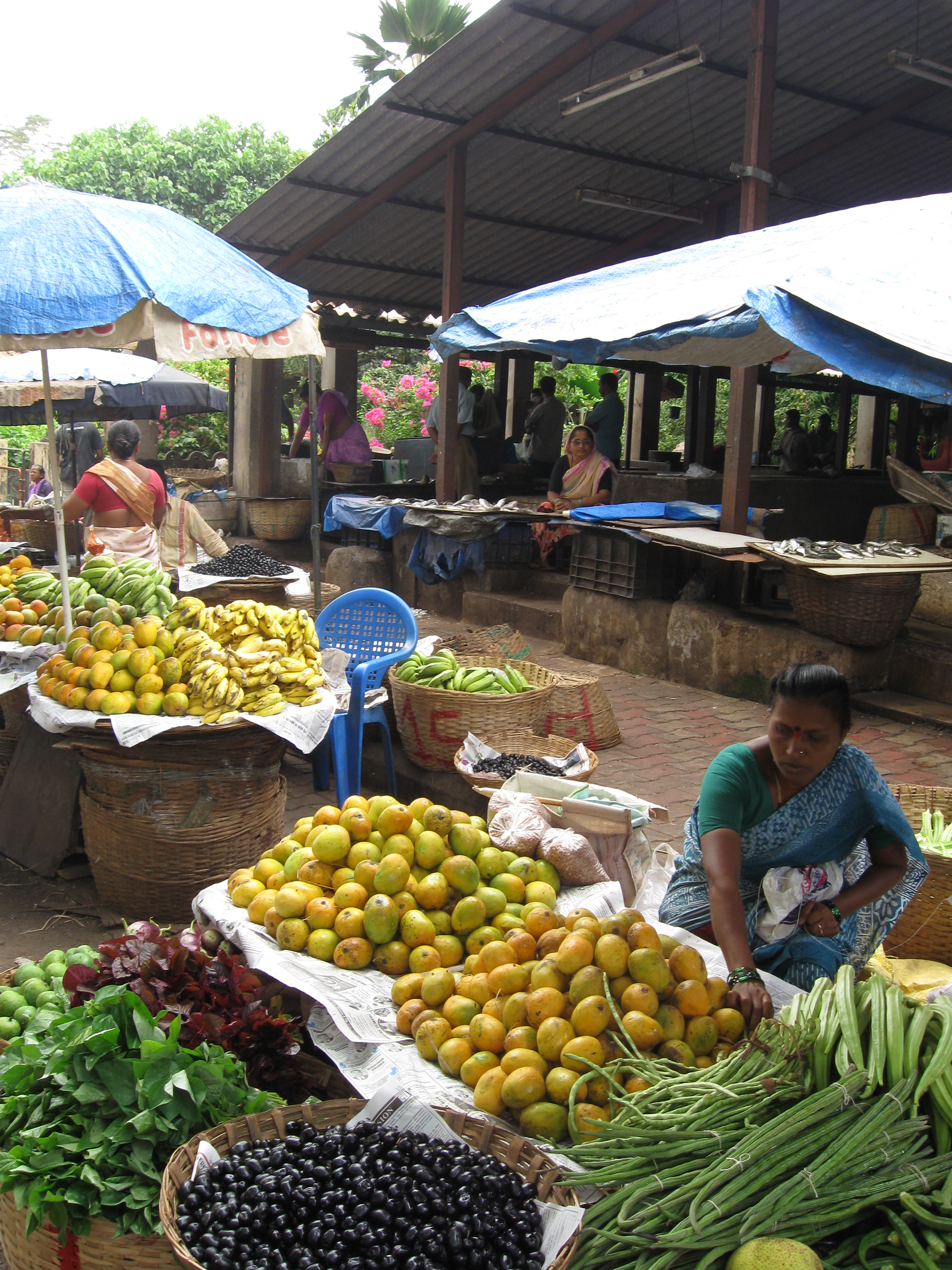
Main fish and produce market

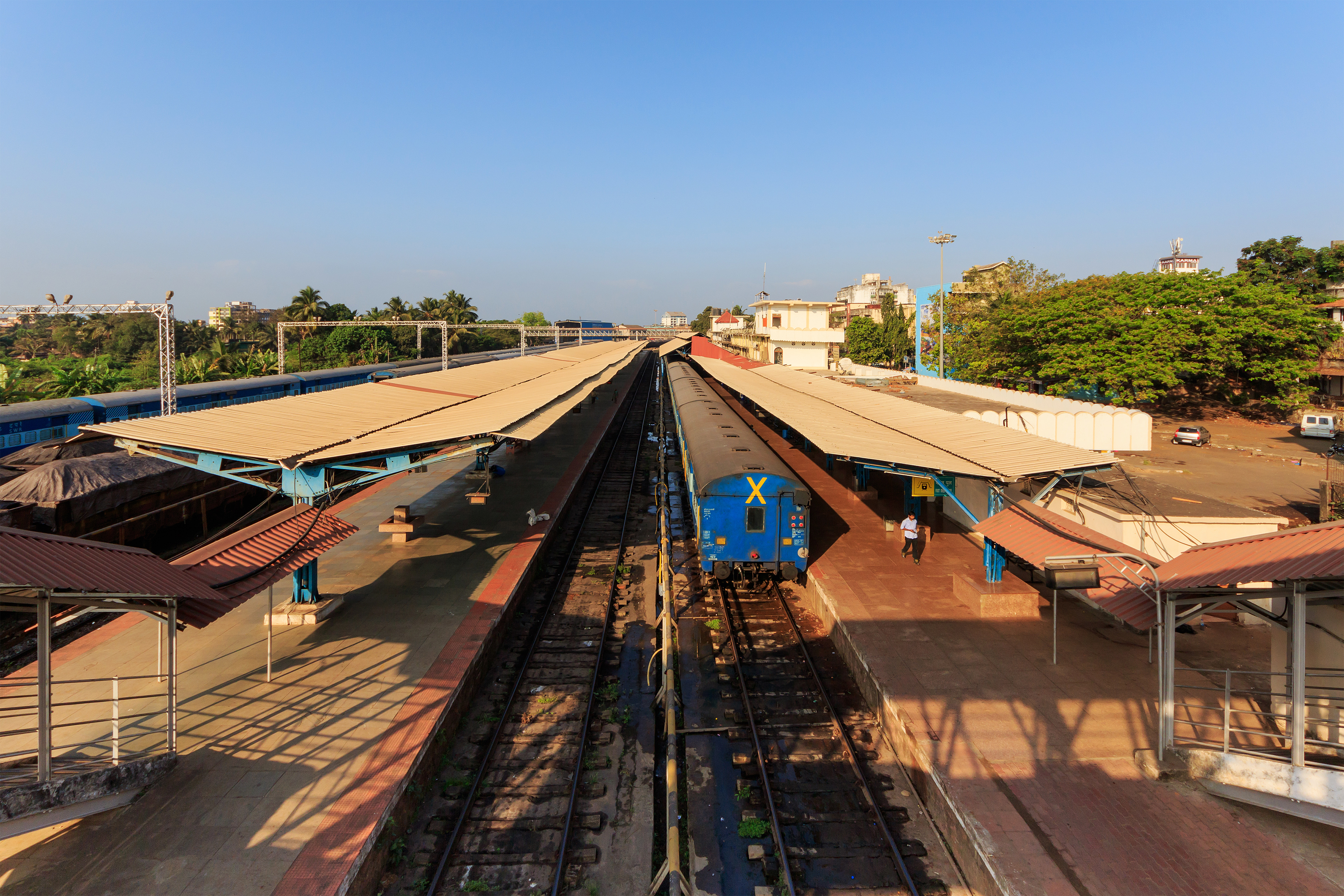
Vasco da Gama Railway Station

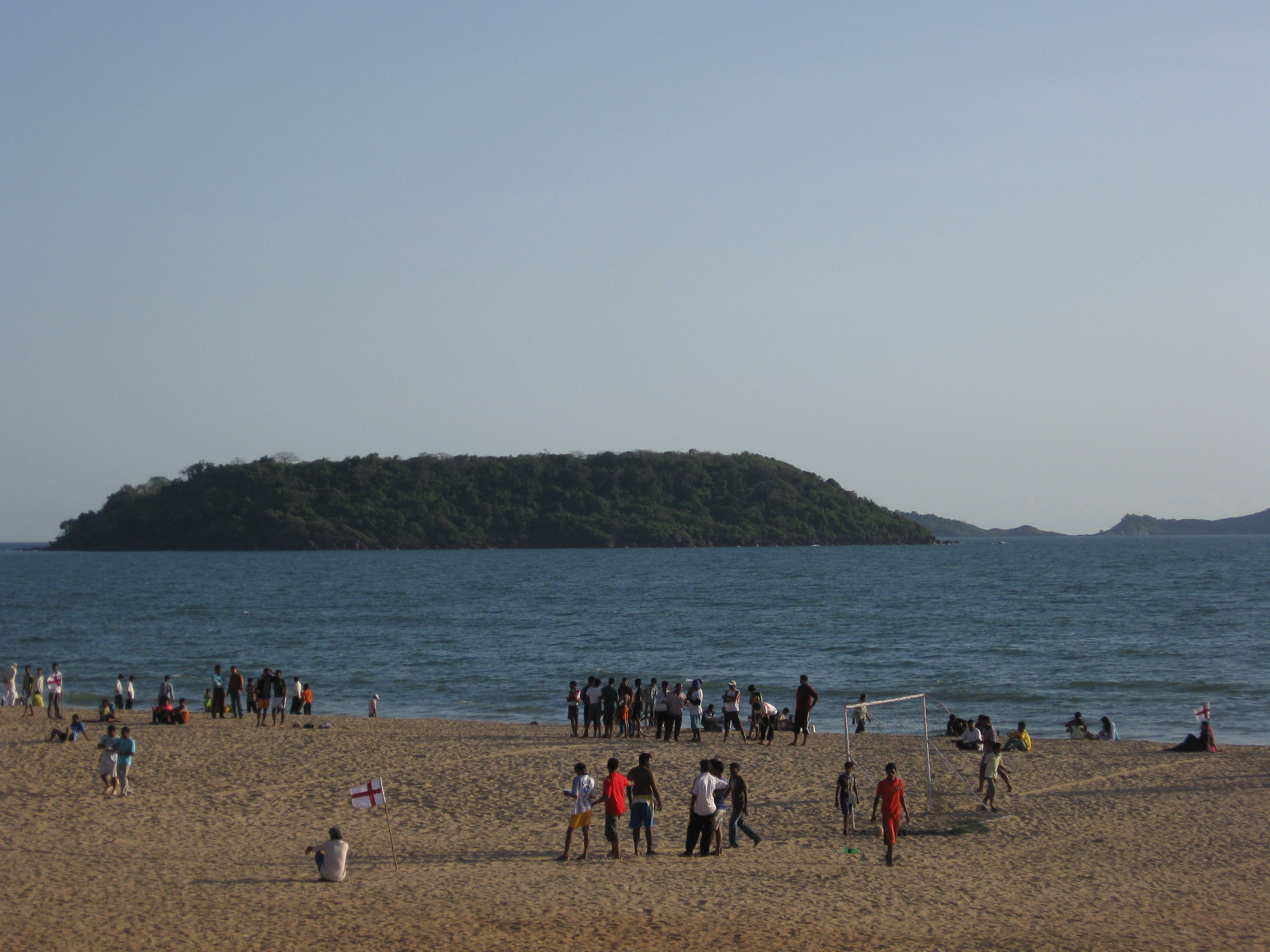
Bat's Island (Pequeno) seen from Baina Beach

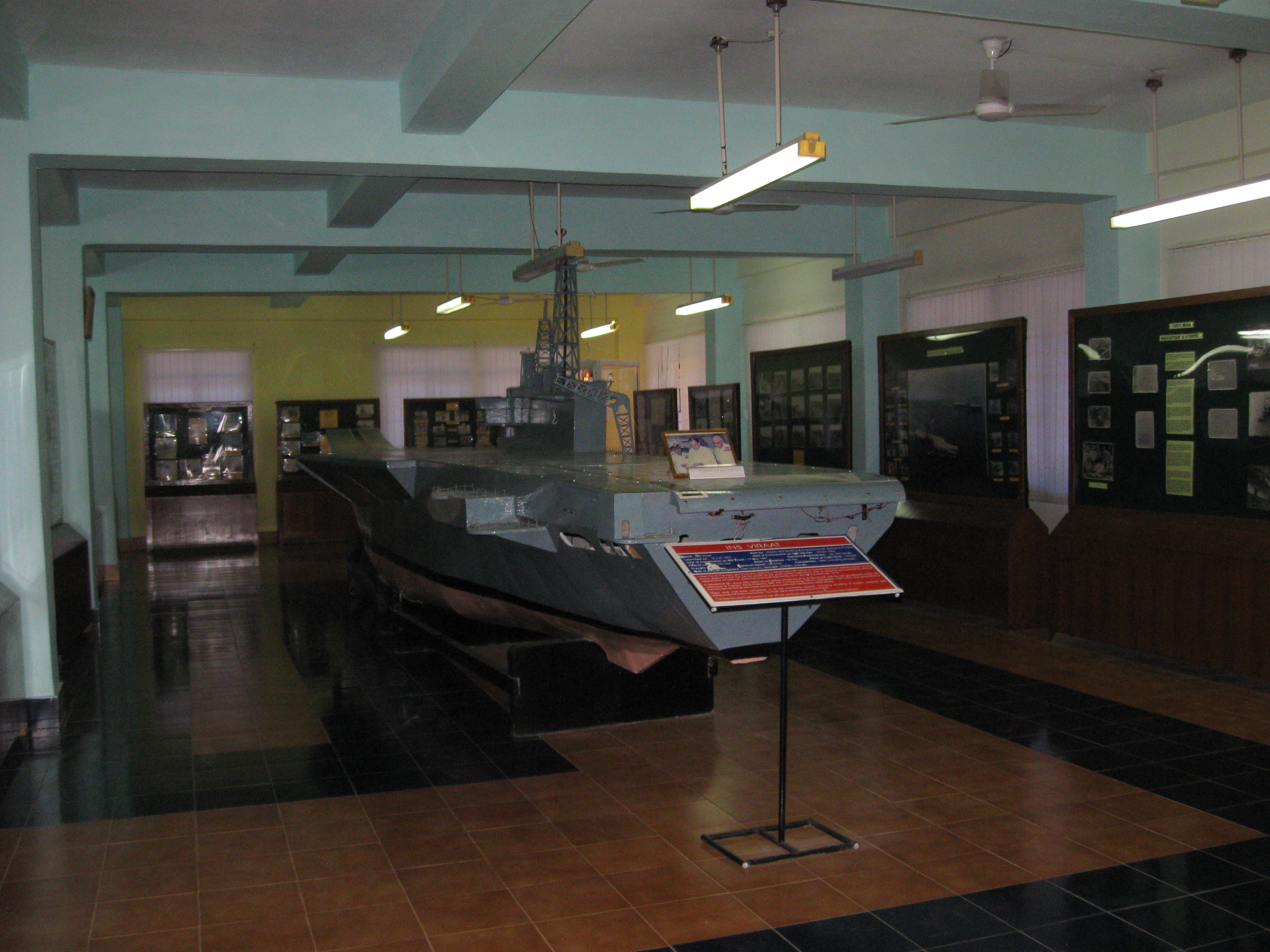
Replica of the INS Viraat at the Naval Aviation Museum
