= Neola Pereira =

Indian environmentalist (born 2000)

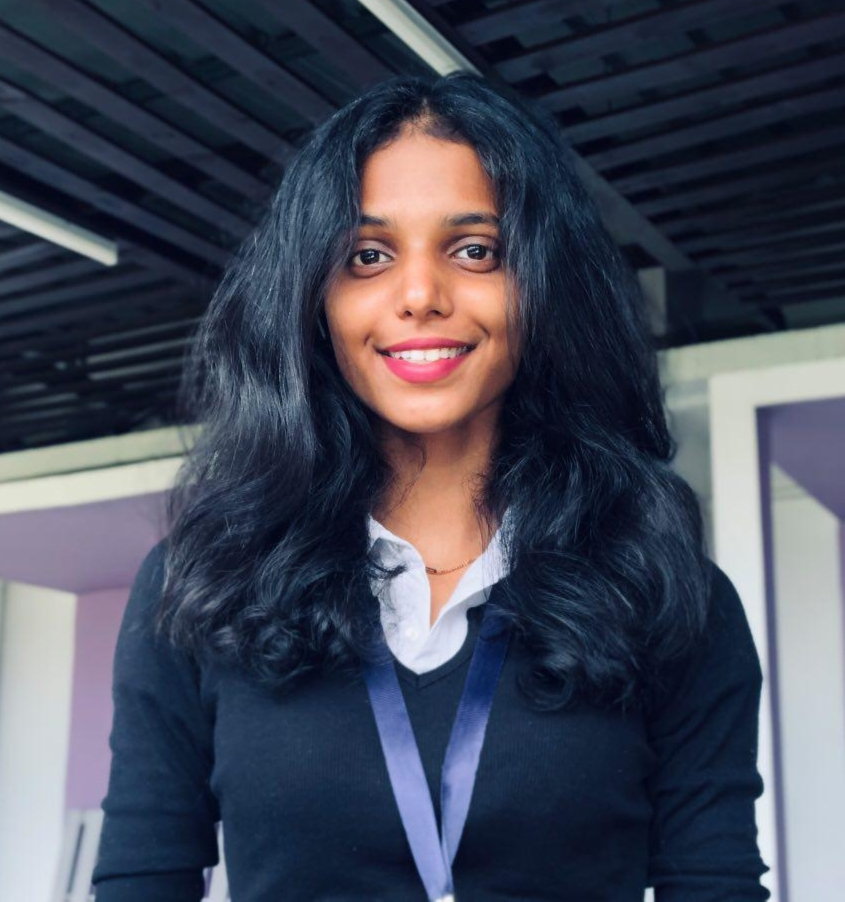
- Pereira in 2023
- Born: Neola Sybil Pereira; 18 April 2000 (age 26); Vasco da Gama, Goa, India
- Education: Regina Mundi High School (S.S.C)
- Occupation: Environmental activist
- Years active: 2019–2021
- Known for: Opposing environmental concerns in Goa
- Movement: Save Mollem
- Neola Pereira's voice "Lisboa" by Lorna Cordeiro: A cover performed by Pereira at the Creative Canvas 2017 in Pilar, Goa

Neola Sybil Pereira (born 18 April 2000) is an Indian environmental activist known for her advocacy against environmental concerns in the coastal state of Goa. She is actively involved in the Chicalim Youth Farmers Club (CYFC) and has played a significant role in the Save Mollem campaign. Pereira, along with the youth, has been vocal in opposing three linear projects; double tracking, the expansion of the national highway, and the transmission of power lines through the Western Ghats.

== Early life and education ==
Neola Sybil Pereira was born on 18 April 2000 to Santana Pereira and Maria Dolly Santiago in Vasco da Gama, Goa. She is the third of three children and has two elder brothers. Pereira hails from Chicalim. She attended Regina Mundi High School, where she served as the captain of Hayes House during the 2015–2016 academic year.

In that same year, Pereira, alongside Meera Roka, led the Hayes House to secure victory in the Inter-house championship for the third consecutive time during the annual sports event. In April 2021, she pursued her studies as an undergraduate specializing in business at a particular educational institution, the name of which has not been disclosed.

As of December 2022, Pereira is a student based in Chennai, India, with aspirations of joining the Indian Administrative Service.

== Activism (2020–2021) ==
On 21 November 2020, the Chicalim Youth Farmers Club (CYFC) expressed their opposition to three infrastructure projects in Mollem: the expansion of railway tracks, the widening of National Highway NH4A, and the construction of a high-tension power line. The CYFC threatened to take to the streets and withhold support for the government in the upcoming 2022 Goa Legislative Assembly elections unless their concerns were addressed. Pereira demanded the removal of the Railway Protection Force (RPF) and the discontinuation of land acquisition in Velsao, South Goa.

Pereira placed significant emphasis on the Sagar Mala project's commitment to generating ample employment prospects for young individuals. However, the specific initiatives associated with the project were appraised as detrimental, leading to widespread resistance from the younger demographic. Concerns were raised by activists who expressed apprehension regarding the efforts to enhance the railway infrastructure within the coastal state of Goa. These activists asserted that such endeavors may indicate a strategic intention to transform the region into a prominent center for coal production and distribution.

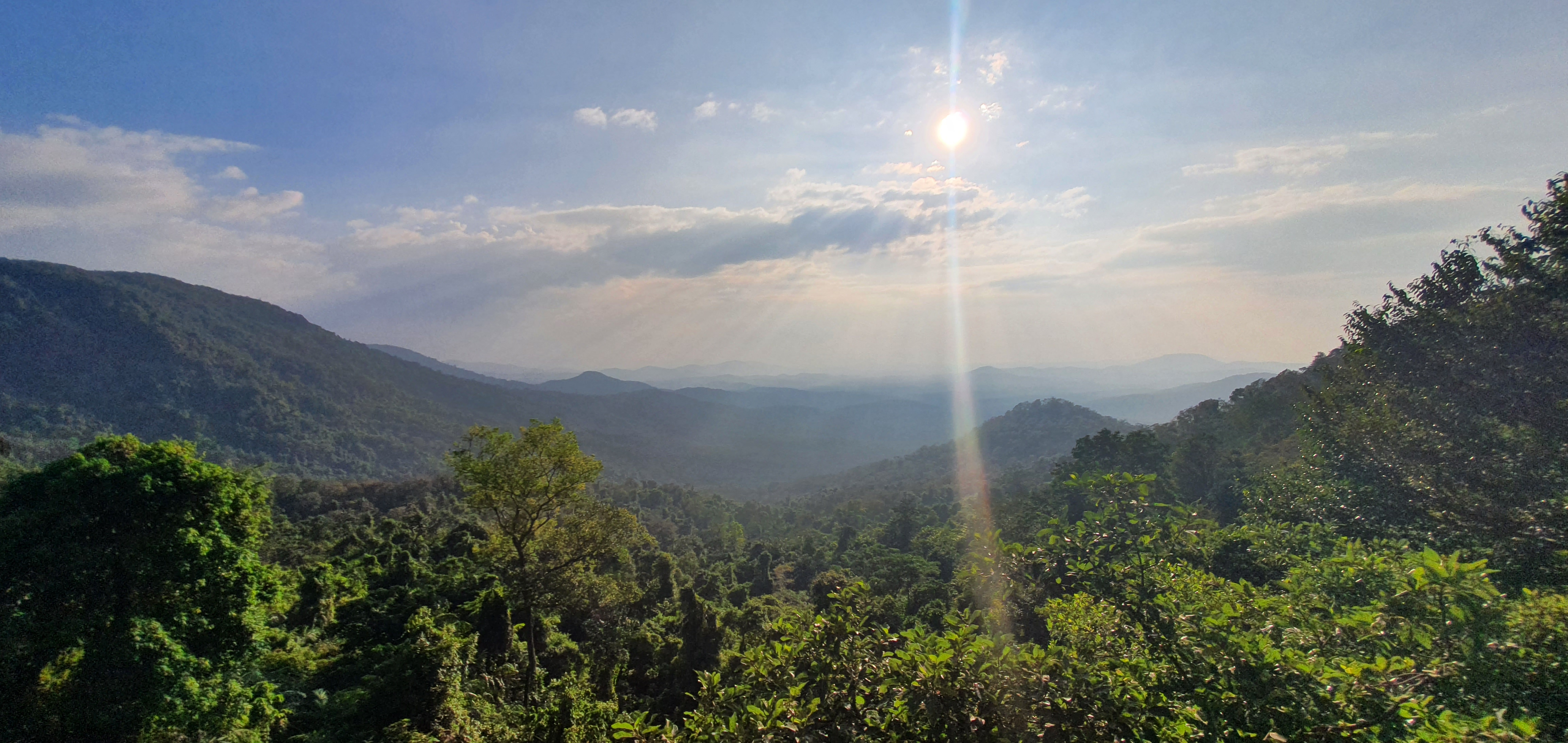
Skyline view from the NH748 of the Mollem forests in 2021

On January 22, 2021, a cohort of young individuals called upon the Central Empowered Committee (CEC), an entity established by the Supreme Court of India, to recommend the rescission of clearances granted to three linear projects located within the Mollem forests. Among the representatives who advocated for this cause were Pereira, Shirly Fernandes, Gabriella D'Cruz, Prifa Xavier, Hyacinths Aguiar, Myron Lucas, Romeo Dias, Mathson Miranda, and Darina Lobo. The group sought to capture the attention of the CEC and draw its focus towards the potential ramifications of these projects, which they believed would cause significant environmental and ecological damage. Additionally, they expressed concerns that the local community would not derive any benefits from the projects, while their ancestral homes were at risk of demolition.

In April 2021, an event took place involving Pereira and a vibrant flash mob dedicated to a crucial cause: the preservation of a jeopardized wildlife reserve. This endeavor was part of a larger movement driven by the youth of India, who were increasingly taking the lead in advocating for environmental concerns, much to the consternation of the country's authorities. Pereira firmly believed that the responsibility of safeguarding the environment extends beyond the realm of environmentalists alone. She undertook an extended campaign opposing a governmental initiative that involved the expansion of railway tracks, the widening of a highway, and the construction of an electricity transmission line that would traverse Mollem National Park. This park played a crucial role as the natural habitat for endangered tigers and other important feline species.

Pereira expressed her initial surprise about actively engaging in the battle against fossil fuels. In February, Disha Ravi, a 22-year-old activist focusing on climate issues, was apprehended by the authorities on sedition charges. The accusation against Ravi entailed her alleged involvement in creating a "toolkit" aimed at aiding the coordination of protests, which was subsequently shared on social media platforms, including with Greta Thunberg, a Swedish activist. Pereira, who had been personally detained by the police in December, admired Ravi and views her as an inspirational figure. Pereira emphasized the desire of young women, including herself, to not only pursue careers but also to utilize their voices for effecting meaningful change.

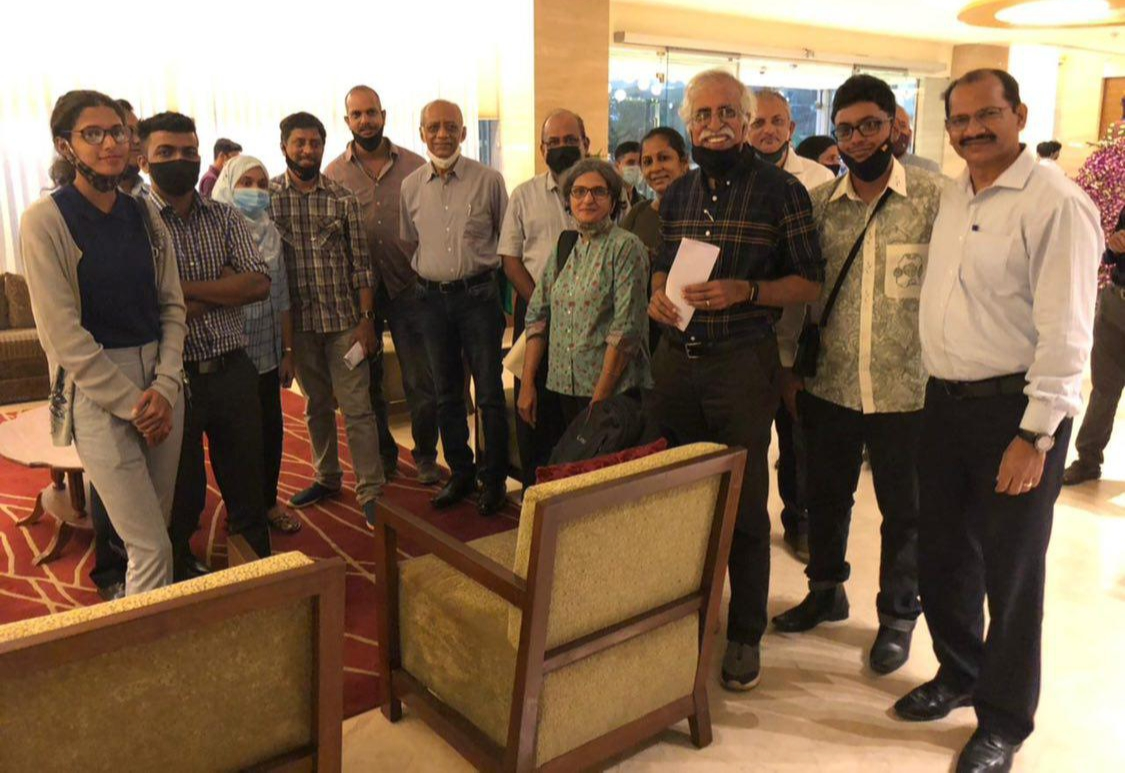
Pereira (extreme left) along with a group of environmentalists, including notable individuals Claude Alvares and Norma Alvares in 2021.

In 2021, Pereira expressed a clear view that the Mollem campaign was undeniably linked to climate change. She emphasized that the act of tree felling in Mollem had aggravated the situation. She remarked that the current circumstances were unprecedented, and if such actions continued, the problem would exacerbate further. Additionally, she mentioned the fortunate timing of the harvest in Chicalim on 14 November, but acknowledged that many farmers across the state encountered difficulties due to unseasonal rainfall.

In April 2021, it was reported that Pereira was actively preparing for a protracted struggle and downplaying concerns regarding potential repression. Pereira recounted an incident of detainment that occurred in December 2020, where law enforcement officials boarded a privately owned bus carrying protestors and instructed the driver to transport them to a police station. Pereira vividly described the situation as a state of entrapment and emphasized their desperate pleas for assistance. Shortly thereafter, Pereira and their companions began live-streaming the event on Instagram, attracting an audience of over 200,000 viewers and inspiring others to offer support. Pereira asserted that the government was apprehensive due to the significant outreach they had achieved, stating, "I am very confident in my ability to emerge victorious from this struggle."

During an interview with O Heraldo, Pereira expressed her aspirations for the community. She emphasized the importance of environmental education and highlighted that one does not need to be an environmentalist to care about the environment. Pereira believed that it is the collective responsibility of all individuals to prioritize environmental concerns. To address this issue, she actively engaged with people she encountered and undertook various initiatives aimed at resolving environmental challenges.

The Save Mollem campaign garnered widespread backing from various demographics, including retirees, church attendees, and particularly the younger generation, owing to its adept utilization of internet-based strategies. Notably, a "Jerusalema" dance challenge was enthusiastically embraced by hundreds of individuals throughout Goa. Mariano Proenca, a 68-year-old clergyman who participated in one of Pereira's demonstrations, reminisced about his childhood experiences of Goa's natural beauty. Expressing concern, he lamented that ongoing development projects were jeopardizing the preservation of nature, thereby depriving future generations of the opportunity to appreciate its splendor.

== Personal life ==
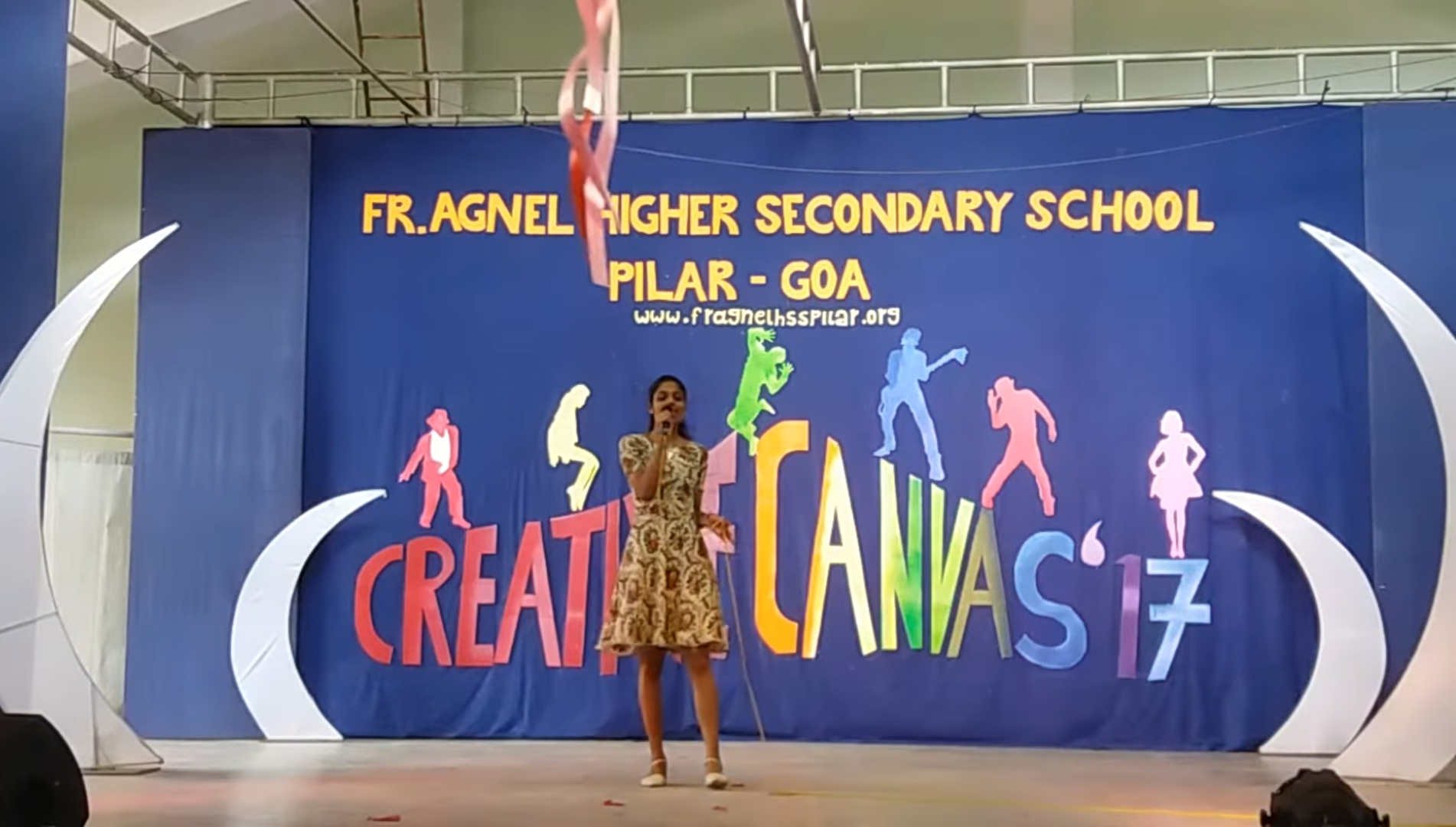
Pereira during a performance at the Creative Canvas 2017 in Pilar, Goa.

Pereira is a vocalist. On 14 October 2018, she achieved the position of 2nd runner-up in the teenage category at the 'Nightingale of Goa' competition, an event dedicated to recognizing original Konkani solo singing. The competition, organized by the Pilar Music Academy of the Pilar Fathers, took place at the Ravindra Bhavan in Margao.

Pereira draws profound inspiration from the words of Robert Swan, a British adventurer, who highlighted the significant risk posed to the planet when individuals rely on the belief that someone else will take responsibility for its preservation. This quote resonated deeply with Pereira and ignited her personal commitment to combating environmental challenges. Engaging in collaborative efforts with intellectuals and fellow nature enthusiasts, Pereira's initial motivation evolved into a passion to safeguard the environment and secure a sustainable future for generations to come.

== 2020 detainment ==
On 19 December 2020, Pereira, accompanied by a group of 35 individuals, including minors, embarked on a private bus journey from Vasco to Panjim with the objective of attending a peaceful function during the occasion of Goa Liberation Day. Pereira had expressed the importance of reaching the location by 2:00 pm to ensure the successful conclusion of the entire program prior to the commencement of the then President of India Ram Nath Kovind's event. However, before reaching their intended destination, the group encountered a contingent of law enforcement officials who halted the bus and assumed control of the situation. This intervention was carried out by four male police officers and a female constable who accompanied the group during the incident.

In numerous accounts, individuals expressed their inquiries to the law enforcement authorities regarding the grounds for their apprehension and the specific legal provisions from the Indian Penal Code (IPC) under which they were being held. Regrettably, they were met with silence as no official response was provided. Pereira recounted the events, stating that their journey was directed towards the northernmost region, with Pernem as their imminent destination. Many of them were actively streaming their experiences on various social media platforms, and in a plea to their audience, they sought assistance and support.

The progress of the bus was halted when an individual parked his bicycle in the middle of the road. As a result of the ensuing traffic congestion, concerned individuals inquired the police regarding the destination of the young passengers, particularly the children. Regrettably, the police refrained from providing any response and proceeded to transport the individuals to the police station. The individual responsible for obstructing the road pursued the bus to ensure that the young passengers were being taken back to their original pick-up location.

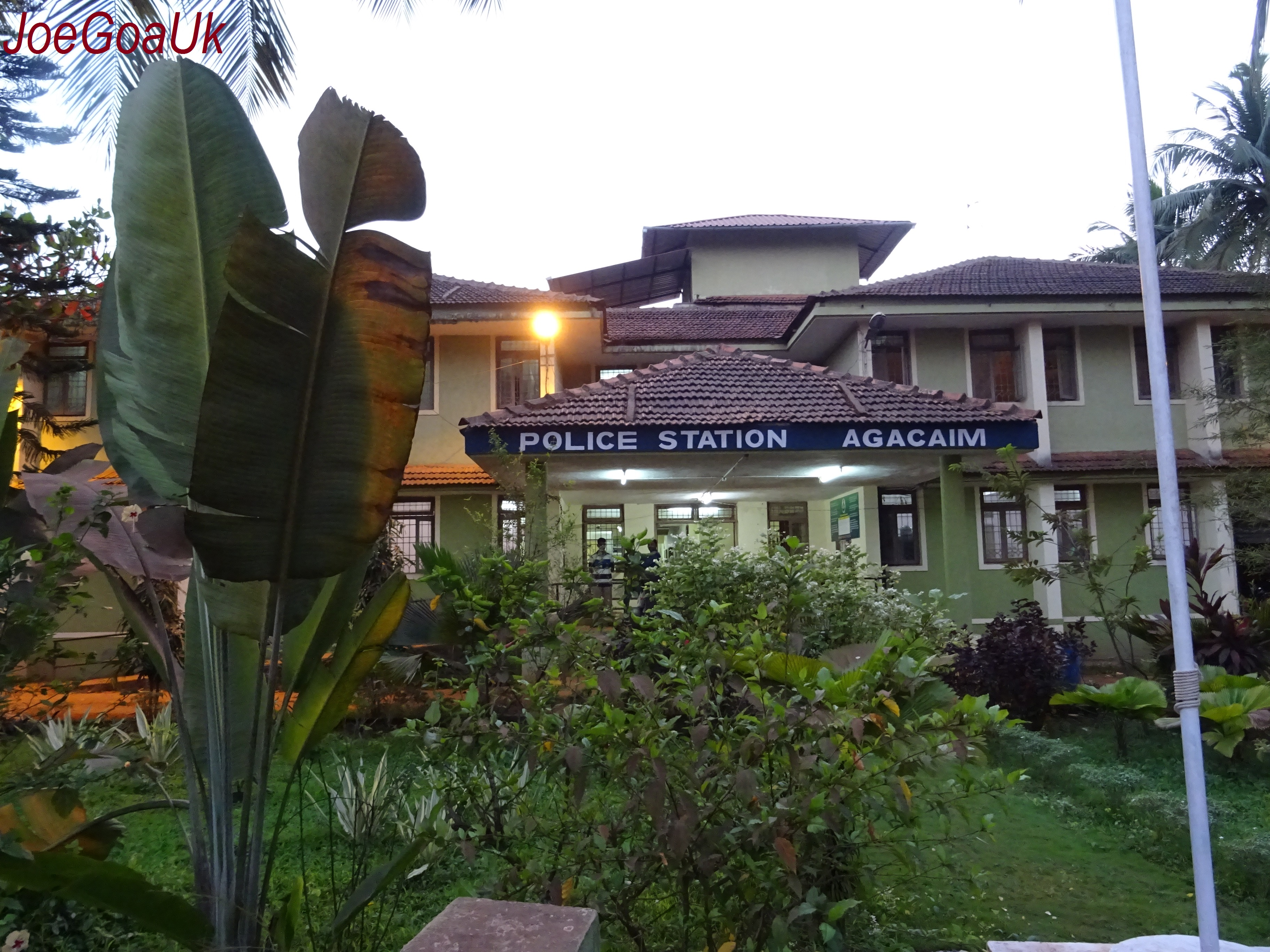
Façade of Agaçaim Police Station

Eventually, the police conveyed the group to the Agaçaim police station. Pereira expressed her disappointment with the lack of communication from the police officers, stating, "The officers remained unresponsive. Some of our young members fell ill during the journey, and although we requested water, they did not provide us with any." Following an extensive period of being driven around in the police bus, the group was subsequently transported to the Ponda police station.

In response to numerous appeals, the police decided to release the individuals. Pereira expressed her dissatisfaction, emphasizing that they were treated unfairly and labeled as terrorists despite not being involved in any acts of terrorism. Several of those detained had no affiliation with the campaign or group in any capacity. While an official statement from the department regarding the incident was undisclosed, a high-ranking police officer informed the media that the detentions were carried out for security purposes. The authorities took action as a precautionary measure to prevent potential disruptions to public order and safety.

In anticipation of increased security measures during the President's visit, prior notification was given to the organizers, requesting them not to hold protests in Panjim and suggesting alternative locations within Goa. However, despite the request, the organizers proceeded with demonstrations in Panjim, as confirmed by a senior official. The subsequent detention of individuals, including minors, caused significant discontent among the local population. Consequently, the parents of those detained made the decision to stage a peaceful protest at the original location, demanding an apology from the police.

== Other work ==
Pereira is an active participant in the Chicalim Parish Youth group of St. Francis Xavier Church in Chicalim. In 2019, she had the opportunity to take part in an event called Youth Connect, organized by the Diocesan Youth Centre. This overnight program took place at the St. Joseph Vaz Spiritual Renewal Centre, located in Old Goa. Accompanied by her companion, Cedric, Pereira joined a gathering of more than 133 young individuals from various regions of Goa who attended the event.

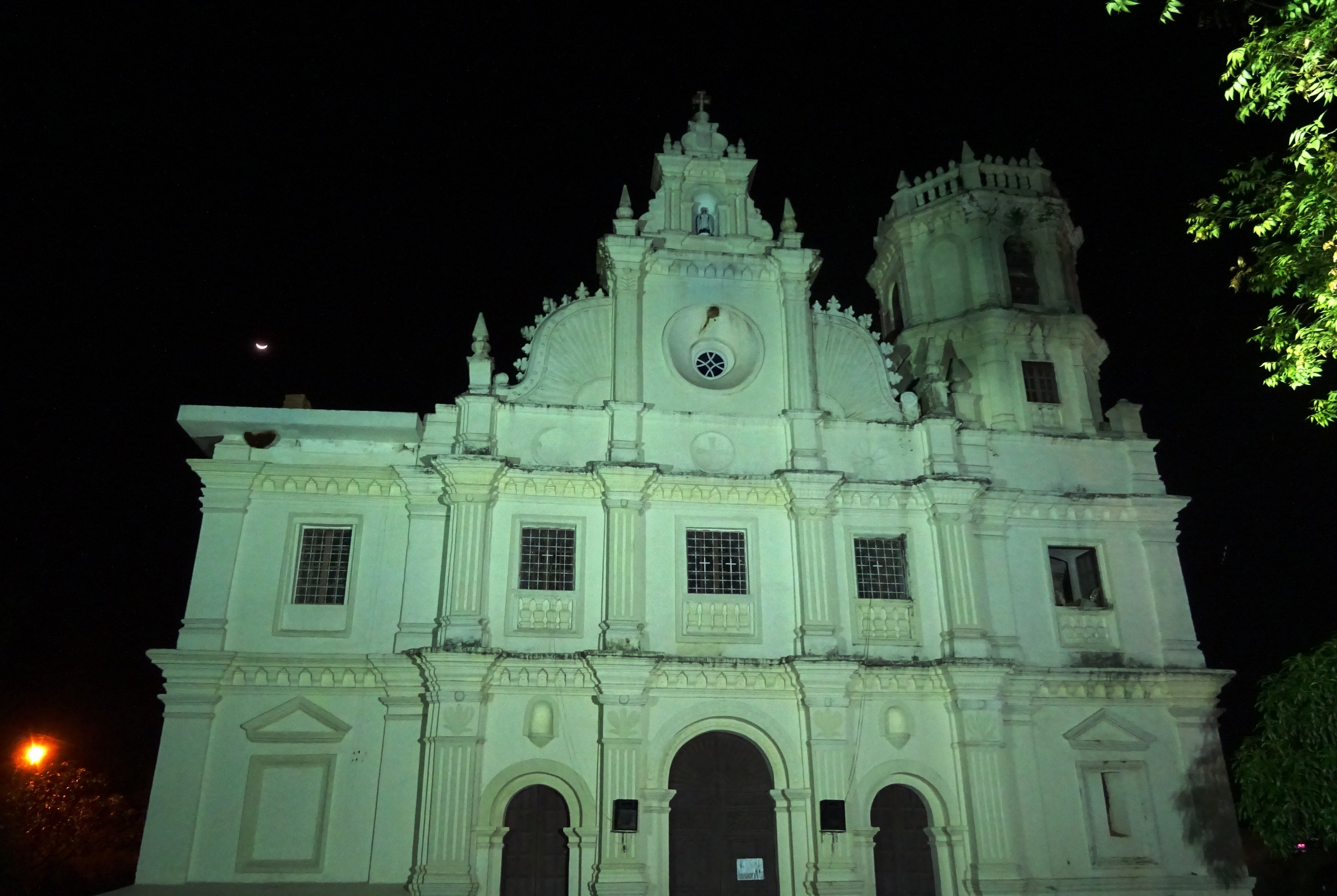
St. Francis Xavier Church in 2014

In 2019, Pereira actively participated during the inception of a philanthropic initiative called "The Giving Tree." This initiative was spearheaded by the youth group affiliated with St. Francis Xavier Church in Chicalim. The primary aim of this charitable endeavor was to provide assistance to families experiencing financial hardships during the festive Christmas season by presenting gifts to underprivileged children.
