= Nirmal Ulhas Kulkarni =

Indian herpetologist (born 1978)

- Born: 27 December 1978 (age 47); Mumbai, Maharashtra, India
- Known for: Herpetologist, Eco-warrior, Ecologist, Conservationist
- Notable work: The Goan Jungle Book

Nirmal Ulhas Kulkarni (born 27 December 1978 in Mumbai, India) is a herpetologist, field ecologist, conservationist, and wildlife photographer. Director (Ecology) of Wildernest Nature Resort, an eco-tel in the Chorla Ghats (Goa), Chairman of the Mhadei Research Centre, Team Lead of Hypnale Research Station and promoter of HERPACTIVE, a study initiative on Herpetofauna. As of December 2012, he lives in Goa.

== Early life ==
Nirmal's grandfather, Shantaram Yeshwant Kulkarni, often took him along on morning walks near their home in Mapusa, Goa, and taught him about the wildlife in their backyard. Their long morning walks together and evening tales were woven around the wildlife of the Konkan region.

== Career ==
A Bachelor in Applied Arts from the Goa College of Art, Nirmal also holds a Masters in Environment and Ecology from the Indian Institute of Environment and Ecology, New Delhi. In addition, he has completed a year-long course in Basic Herpetology from the Bombay Natural History Society. These foundation courses, during which he met experts in the field like Ashok Captain, Bittu Sahgal, Varad Giri, Dr. Ulhas Karanth and Romulus Whitaker, enabled him to leapfrog from a snake handler and nature photographer to a herpetologist.

=== Related work ===
In 16 years of ground work with communities, field staff, researchers and students, Nirmal has experimented the combination of science, photography, activism and linked field conservation, communities, livelihoods, natural resource management and environment protection, into a practical working model at Wildernest Nature Resort, Chorla Ghat, Goa and in the surrounding areas.

Nirmal has researched, mapped and recorded the secrets of the Mhadei Bio Region. He would often accompany renowned historian and environmentalist Mr. Rajendra Kerkar into deep forests, armed with just a camera. Those journeys whetted his appetite to know more about the region which was undocumented, and on several self-funded journeys he photo-documented the diversity of Mahdei – particularly lesser known animal species like reptiles and amphibians, insects and spiders.

By establishing the Mhadei Research Centre, the Northern Western Ghat's first independent field research station, he has established a single platform that trains young naturalists, brings communities and wildlife enthusiasts together, and documents the biodiversity of the region. His other base, The Hypnale Research Station at Kuveshi, Karnataka is considered as a beacon to follow for other field stations in the Western Ghats of India. Using these two bases, he has spent much of the last decade in inspiring young Turks to carry the mantle of conserving the Western Ghats for posterity.

=== Discoveries ===
- Discovery of Ichthyophis davidi
- Discovery of Gegeneophis goaensis
- Discovery of Gegeneophis mhadeiensis
- Range extension of sub-species of the pit viper (Peotobothrops jerdonii xanthomelas) - the Jerdon's Red spotted pit viper - from the Eaglenest Wildlife sanctuary in Arunachal Pradesh.
- Discovery of Fegervarya gomantaki

== Television and media ==
http://www.ndtv.com/video/player/news/nirmal-kulkarni-s-efforts-to-save-the-wildlife/237330

http://en.gaonconnection.com/india/campaign-to-create-awareness-about-threatened-python-species-in-india

== Honors and awards ==
- Nehru Yuva Award for spreading conservation message amongst the Goan youth for over a decade, January 2001
- Mudra award for Ad campaign on wildlife protection by Goa College of Art, Goa University, April 2001
- Sarpamitra award by Indian Herpetological Society for contribution to Reptile conservation in the Sahyadris in general and Goa in particular, March 2002
- Ecologist of the year Award for ecology-related work in the state of Goa by ECHO Goa, an organization working for nature conservation, November 2005
- 1st Place in State level Wildlife Photography contest in Nature Photography and Wildlife Photography competition organized by Forest Department, October 2008
- Gera Big Green Goenkar Award for work in wildlife conservation in Goa, June 2009
- Carl Zeiss Award for research and conservation initiatives, April 2011
- Nomination for Lokmat Gourav Puraskar 2012
- Karmaveer Puraskar November 2012.
- Vasundhara Award September 2013.
- Royal Bank of Scotland Earth Hero award 2013 in the ‘Inspire’ category in Delhi on 15 November 2013
- Sanctuary Asia Award 'Wind Under Wings' 2014

== Conservation initiatives ==
While working with communities, Nirmal's team has trained interest youth to become entrepreneurs and eco-warriors in the field. Volunteers, students and professionals have joined in various capacities for field conservation by sacrificing time and toiling hard to collate data, conduct outreach programs and influence policy.

As part of his scientific pursuit - • He has headed and contributed to several research projects:

- National Biodiversity Strategy and Action Plan – studying man-reptile relationship in Sattari Taluka
- Sahyadri Ecologically Sensitive Area – documenting and compiling reptile species
- Indian Herpetological Society – creating a detailed database of snakes in Goa, Karnataka and Maharashtra for an e-guide
- Goa Forest Department – participation in three wildlife census
- Habitat monitoring and impact on the Olive Ridley Sea Turtles at Morjim beach, which ultimately led to the conservation of their nesting areas
- Mhadei Bachao Abhiyan – independent study on the impact the Mahdei river diversion will have on the Herpetofauna
- Compilation of basic biodiversity checklists of sacred groves in Sattari Taluka
- Archeological Society of India – documentation of heritage iconography in Sattari

He has significant discoveries to his credit -

- Goan caecilian (Gegeneophis goaensis) – Sattari District, Keri Village, Goa
- Mahdei caecilian (Gegeneophis mhadeiensis) – Chorla Village, Khanapur Taluka, Karnataka
- Chorla Giant striped Ichthyophis (Ichthyophis davidi) from Chorla and Castle Rock in Karnataka
- Range extension of sub-species of the Pit Viper (Protobothrops jerdonii xanthomelas) – the Jerdon's Red Spotted Pit Viper – Eaglenest Wildlife Sanctuary, Arunachal Pradesh

In addition, he has worked as a volunteer with the Wildlife Conservation Society for estimating prey for tigers in the Nagarhole Wildlife Sanctuary in Karnataka, and as a group team leader on a Conservation Programme at the Eaglenest Wildlife Sanctuary, Arunachal Pradesh. He is also involved in data collection and consultancy services on eco-tourism and wildlife research projects in six states, including Goa, Arunachal Pradesh and Uttaranchal. His experience in setting up and running Wildernest Nature Resort, an eco-tel in the heart of Chorla Ghats, holds him in good stead.

Nirmal's growing role as an activist can be seen in the successful ‘Save the Frogs’ campaign against the local consumption of Indian Bullfrogs, which he led along with co-campaigner Clinton Vaz and the Goa Forest Department. The campaign included awareness-cum-law enforcement activities. He was also part of a team that worked on conserving the Bhimgad Forests in Karnataka. Their efforts ultimately led to the creation of the Bhimgad Wildlife Sanctuary. The efforts by his team under Nirmal's leadership also have helped declare the Mahdei Wildlife Sanctuary as a Proposed Tiger Reserve and bring attention to the Mahdei Dam Project that is slated to irreversibly damage prime Western Ghats habitat.

He is associated with and connected to multiple state and national-level organizations which focus on ecological and wildlife conservation. Most notably, he is affiliated to:

- Goa State Wildlife Advisory Board
- Madras Crocodile Bank Trust and Centre for Herpetology
- Goa Heritage Action Group
- Indian Bird Conservation Network and Goa State Bird Conservation Network
- Western Ghats Core Group – Goa State
- Bombay Natural History Society
- Mahdei Bachao Abhiyan
- Sahyadri Ecologically Sensitive Area (SESA) Committee
- Katraj Snake Park and Uttara's Ark, a Wildlife rehabilitation center cum snake park at Katraj, Pune
- TigerLink network, a national network formed to conserve the tiger and its habitat
- Conservation and Livelihoods network, a network formed to protect community rights as well as natural habitats in the country
- Indian Herpetological Society, a body working in the field of reptile conservation in the country
- Vivekanand Environment Awareness Brigade, an NGO involved in spreading conservation awareness in the state

He was assisted, and mentored by stalwarts in the field of biodiversity research and documentation, most notably Dr. Claude Alvares, Dr. Manoj Borkar, Dr. G K Bhatt and Dr. M. K. Janarthanan.

Nirmal and his team work with communities, both urban and rural, with youth and children, with professionals and tourists and in all these target groups the approaches are different and depend on issues as well as needs. The confidence building measures include providing sustainable livelihoods to over 200 families directly or indirectly, reviving age old green traditions, documenting intellectual property issues and providing platforms for communities as well as individuals to rise. The Children's Outreach Programme is the backbone of their initiatives and touches 30 schools across 3 states, which has been acknowledged on a national level by wildlife conservation groups as well as by the media.

Nirmal Kulkarni was invited to the Philippines in August 2013 on a series of lectures and talks. He was invited to speak on ‘Engaging youth for conservation through field research training in India’ by the University of Cebu and the KAS Environmental Law Talks committee. He was also a speaker at "Nurturing Biodiversity Protection among Children" that was organized by the Philippines Earth Justice Center and Dept of Education, City of Cebu Province. Nirmal also engaged with Forest stewards of the Tabunan forests and with Councilor archival at the Eco House on issues ranging from conservation and recycling to wildlife documentation. He was also a speaker at the Forum on Eco Tourism that was organized by Cebu City government and Grassroots Travel. Nirmal was also interviewed on a local television channel by the Cebu lady lawyer's association and his work was covered in local newspapers.

His efforts in the Goa State have been covered by CNN-IBN, BBC Open Country, NDTV, Zee News, Sahara News, ETV Marathi, Star News and other local media. Also, his personal databank of professional images of Goa's hinterland and diversity is used by various NGOs, individuals, and institutions in the state as well as nationally for education and creating awareness.

== Books ==
Nirmal has authored The Goan Jungle Book which is aimed at educating students in particular and the Goan populace in general about Goa's lesser known wildlife.
