= List of people from Bengaluru =

Notable People from Bengaluru

This is a list of notable people from Bengaluru.

== Founder and Architect of Bengaluru ==
- Nada Prabhu Kempe Gowda

== Scientists ==
- C V Raman – Nobel Prize in Physics (1930), Bharat Ratna (1954)
- M. Visvesvarayya – Bharat Ratna, in 1955, Indian civil engineer, statesman, Diwan of Mysore
- C. N. R. Rao – Bharat Ratna (2014) Indian Institute of Science (Material Sciences) Bharat Ratna (2014)
- H Narasimhaiah – Indian physicist, educator, writer, freedom fighter and rationalist Padma Bhushan (1984)
- Bangalore Puttaiya Radhakrishna – geologist
- Kumble R. Subbaswamy – physicist
- Sachidananda Kangovi - Aerospace engineer, IT executive, and author

== Politicians ==
- H. D. Deve Gowda - former prime minister
- H. D. Kumaraswamy - former chief minister of Karnataka
- Gundu Rao - former Chief Minister
- Siddaramaiah - former Chief Minister
- B S Yediyurappa - former Chief Minister
- Ramalinga Reddy - former State Home Minister and various ministry, seven time MLA from Bangalore
- D. K. Shivakumar - former minister of medical education
- B.Vaikunta Vaikunta Baliga - former Law Minister; former Speaker, Mysore State
- S.Bangarappa - former Chief Minister
- S. R. Bommai - former Chief Minister
- George Fernandes - former Defence Minister
- Kengal Hanumanthaiah - former Chief Minister
- Ramakrishna Hegde - former Chief Minister
- Qamar ul Islam - former Housing and Labour Minister
- Basappa Danappa Jatti - former Vice-President
- M.N. Jois - former M.L.C, Deputy Speaker of Legislative Council - Mysore State
- Mallikarjun Kharge - former State Minister (various portfolios); former Union Labour Minister in the Manmohan Singh Government; current leader of Opposition in Lok Sabha
- S. M. Krishna - former External Affairs Minister of India; former Governor of Maharashtra; former Chief Minister of Karnataka
- H.N.Ananth Kumar - former Union Minister and MP
- Kadidal Manjappa - former Chief Minister
- Veerappa Moily - Minister of Petroleum and Natural Gas; former Chief Minister
- K. H. Muniyappa - union minister of state for railways
- S. Nijalingappa - former Chief Minister
- Nandan Nilekani - Chairman of the Unique Identification Authority of India (UIDAI)
- J. H. Patel - former Chief Minister
- Veerendra Patil - former Chief Minister
- M. A. M. Ramaswamy - Rajya Sabha MP and industrialist
- K. C. Reddy - former Chief Minister
- Dharam Singh - former Chief Minister
- Devaraj Urs - former Chief Minister
- H. Vishwanath - former Minister

== Kannada writers ==
- Kuvempu – poet, Jnanpith awardee
- U. R. Ananthamurthy – Kannada writer, thinker and Jnanpith awardee
- Da Ra Bendre – poet, Jnanpith awardee
- S. L. Bhyrappa – writer, novelist
- V. K. Gokak – writer, Jnanapith awardee
- Masti Venkatesh Iyengar – Jnanpith awardee
- T. P. Kailasam – Kannada writer, playwright
- Chandrashekhar Kambar – Jnanapith awardee for his contributions to Kannada literature
- K. Shivaram Karanth – Kannada writer, Jnanapith awardee
- Girish Karnad – Kannada writer, playwright, actor, Jnanpith awardee
- K. S. Nissar Ahmed – Kannada poet
- Sudha Murthy

== Other writers ==
- Mahesh Dattani – English playwright and Sahitya Akademi award winner
- Ramachandra Guha – historian and Sahitya Akademi award winner
- Sangu Mandanna – English-language writer
- Anita Nair – English author of the books Ladies Coupe and Mistress
- Malathi Rao – English-language writer, Sahitya Akademi award winner
- Madhuri Vijay – English-language writer, Pushcart Prize winner

== Entrepreneurs ==
- G. R. Gopinath – founder of Deccan Aviation and Deccan 360
- Kiran Mazumdar – founder of Biocon, a biotechnology company
- N. R. Narayana Murthy – founder of Infosys
- Nandan Nilekani – Co-founder of Infosys
- V. G. Siddhartha – founder of Café Coffee Day

== Sportspersons ==
=== Athletics ===
- Ashwini Nachappa – former athlete

=== Badminton ===
- Prakash Padukone – badminton player
- Ashwini Ponnappa

=== Billiards ===
- Pankaj Advani – billiards and snooker World Champion

=== Cricket ===
- Mayank Agarwal – Indian cricketer
- John Bean – English first-class cricketer and British Army officer
- Vijay Bhardwaj – former Indian allrounder
- Raghuram Bhat – former Indian left-arm spinner
- Roger Binny – former Indian all rounder
- Stuart Binny – all rounder
- B. S. Chandrasekhar – Wisden Cricketer of the Year in 1972
- Rahul Dravid – batsman, former India Captain and has taken highest number of catches in international cricket
- Dodda Ganesh – former medium pacer
- Sunil Joshi – retired all rounder
- Syed Kirmani – retired wicket-keeper
- Prasidh Krishna – fast bowler
- Veda Krishnamurthy – Indian woman cricketer
- Vinay Kumar – medium pacer
- Anil Kumble – leg spinner, Test Captain, India's highest wicket taker, former Indian National Cricket Team coach
- Abhimanyu Mithun – Indian cricketer
- Devdutt Padikkal – Ranji player
- Manish Pandey – Indian cricketer
- Venkatesh Prasad – retired fast bowler; India's former bowling coach
- Erapalli Prasanna – retired off spinner
- KL Rahul – Indian cricketer
- Javagal Srinath – retired fast bowler, match referee
- Robin Uthappa – Indian cricketer
- Vellaswamy Vanitha – former Indian woman cricketer
- Sadanand Viswanath – former Indian wicket-keeper
- Gundappa Ranganath Vishwanath – former Indian cricket captain (1979–1980)

=== Hockey ===
- Ashish Ballal – hockey goalkeeper
- Arjun Halappa – Indian hockey team

=== Motorsports ===
- Arjun Maini – Asian Le Mans Series and Deutsche Tourenwagen Masters driver
- Akhil Rabindra – GT4 European Series driver
- Nikhil Pai – Indian rallying co-driver
- Shreyas Hareesh – Indian motorcycle racer

=== Swimming ===
- Nisha Millet – Olympian at Sydney Olympics 2000

=== Tennis ===
- Rohan Bopanna

== Entertainers ==
=== Kannada and Indian cinema ===
- Dino Morea – actor, supermodel
- Ramesh Aravind - actor
- Sandeep Chowta - music director, producer
- Guru Dutt - actor, director, producer
- Dwarkeesh - actor, comedian
- Nicole Faria (born 1990) – actress, model, Miss Earth 2010
- Hamsalekha - music director, lyricist, dramatist
- Jaggesh - actor
- Amoghavarsha JS - filmmaker
- Kalpana - actress, Minugutare
- Puttanna Kanagal - director
- Girish Kasaravalli - director
- Kashinath - actor
- Feroz Khan - actor, editor, producer, director
- Sanjay Khan - producer, director and actor
- Bangalore Latha - playback singer
- Malashree - actress
- Manjula - actress
- Nithya Menen - actress
- Anant Nag - actor, brother of Shankar Nag
- Shankar Nag - actor, producer, director
- Nayanthara - actress, producer (born in Bengaluru from Malayali ancestry)
- Deepika Padukone - model, actress
- Prema - actress
- Prakash Raj - actor, director, producer
- Rajinikanth - actor
- Dr. Rajkumar - actor, singer, producer
- Puneeth Rajkumar - actor, son of Dr. Rajkumar
- Raghavendra Rajkumar - actor, son of Dr. Rajkumar
- Shiva Rajkumar - actor, son of Dr. Rajkumar
- Ramya - actress, politician
- Kiran Rao - producer, screenwriter, and director
- V. Ravichandran - actor, director, producer, music director, editor
- Anushka Sharma - actress
- Soundarya - actress
- Srinath - actor, Pranaya Raja, Shubha Mangala
- Sudeepa - actor, director, producer, singer, host
- Darshan Thoogudeep - actor
- Chi. Udayashankar - dialogue writer and lyricist
- Upendra - director, actor, producer
- Rockline Venkatesh - actor, film producer
- Dr. Vishnuvardhan - actor, singer
- Yash - actor

== Architects ==
- K. Jaisim
- Kamal Sagar

== Spiritual leaders ==
- Shivakumara Swami
- Balagangadharanatha Swamiji

== Other notable people ==
- R. K. Baliga – founder of the Electronics City in Bangalore
- Shakuntala Devi – known as the "human calculator"
- Trivikrama Mahadeva – organiser of funerals for tens of thousands of paupers
- Thomas Mohan (born 1959) – wildlife photographer and civil engineer
- Maya Rao (1928–2014) – Kathak Guru; founder of Natya Institute of Kathak and Choreography
- Major Sandeep Unnikrishnan AC, (15 March 1977 – 28 November 2008) – military officer
- Dr H. N. Shubhada – educationalist
- Veeranarayana Pandurangi – Sanskrit scholar

== See also ==
- List of people by India state
- List of people from Karnataka
