= Shubhada =

Shubhada can be a feminine given name or a surname. Notable people with the name include:

== Given name ==
- Shubhada Chari, Indian author, folklorist, and teacher
- Shubhada Gogate, India-based author
- Shubhada Varadkar, India-based author and dancer

== Surname ==
- H. N. Shubhada, India-based education researcher
