= Gomantak Marathi Academy =

Marathi organization in Goa, India

Gomantak Marathi Academy was a pro-Marathi organisation established in 1987. It had more than 56 centres working for the development of language and culture of Marathi population in Goa. The academy mobilised support for various activities like literature, culture, art, and drama, worked to make Marathi an official language in Goa, and believed that Konkani is dialect of Marathi. It contributed significantly to defending the Marathi language and its diasporic people in Goa.

However, the government of Goa stopped its annual grant and formed a new Goa Marathi Academy on 12 August 2014 under the chairmanship of Prof. Anil Samant with the following members: Ashok Naik, Chandrakant Gawas, Pournima Kerkar, Vallabh Kelkar, Paresh Prabhu, Sagar Jawadekar, Gajanan Mandrekar, Janardan Verlekar, Tushar Tople, Anand Mayekar, Dashrath Parab and Shashank Thakur.
