= Heta Pandit =

Indian heritage activist (born 1954)

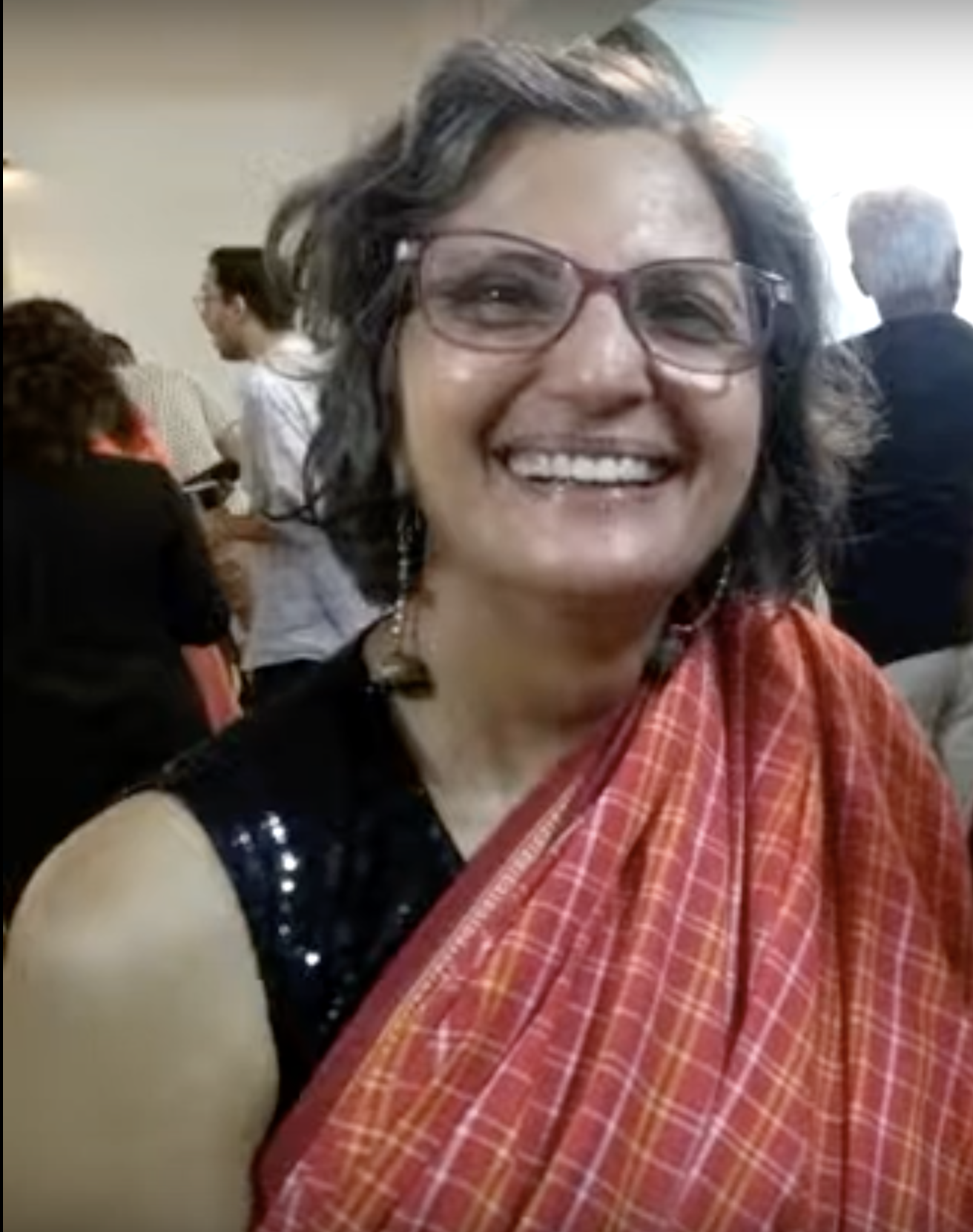
- Heta Pandit
- Born: 1954 (age 71–72)
- Occupations: Historian, writer

Heta Pandit (born 1954) is an Indian writer, researcher, and heritage activist whose work focuses on documenting Goa’s architectural and cultural legacy. She has explored the historic Goan homes, their local customs and practices.

== Career ==
In 2002, she co-founded the "Goa Heritage Action Group". In 2015, she hosted the Heritage First Festival, which included walking tours and workshops at multiple locations, aiming to educate people about Goan heritage and culture. She also co-founded "Heritage First Goa" in November 2024.

In 2023, Pandit published Stories from Goan Houses, in which she examines the architectural features, family histories, and cultural practices surrounding old Goan homes. Two years later, in 2025, she wrote the book Grinding Stories. Folklorist Shubhada Chari assisted her translating the folksongs and other stories. She learnt about the "Oviyos" when she met Rajendra Kerkar and Pournima Kerkar. Pandit is working on translation of Pournima Kerkar's book "Vismrutichya Umbarthavar" from marathi to english. This book explores the cultural significance of everyday objects like grinding stones and their links to local traditions. Nevertheless, Dr. Luis Dias points out, Pandit is not Goan and laments her status as an "outsider," and "sensationalist."

== Advocacy and themes ==
Pandit’s writings often stress the cooperative nature of Goan society, describing how local communities have historically supported each other through difficult circumstances. She notes that Goans sometimes even extend help to adversaries during crises, reflecting a strong sense of solidarity.

She also promotes responsible development and tourism, urging homeowners to protect the architectural character of their properties and surrounding landscapes. In her view, conservation efforts must include not only physical structures but also the stories that define Goan identity.

== Awards ==
Business Award 2021
