= Pournima Kerkar =

Indian author and folklorist

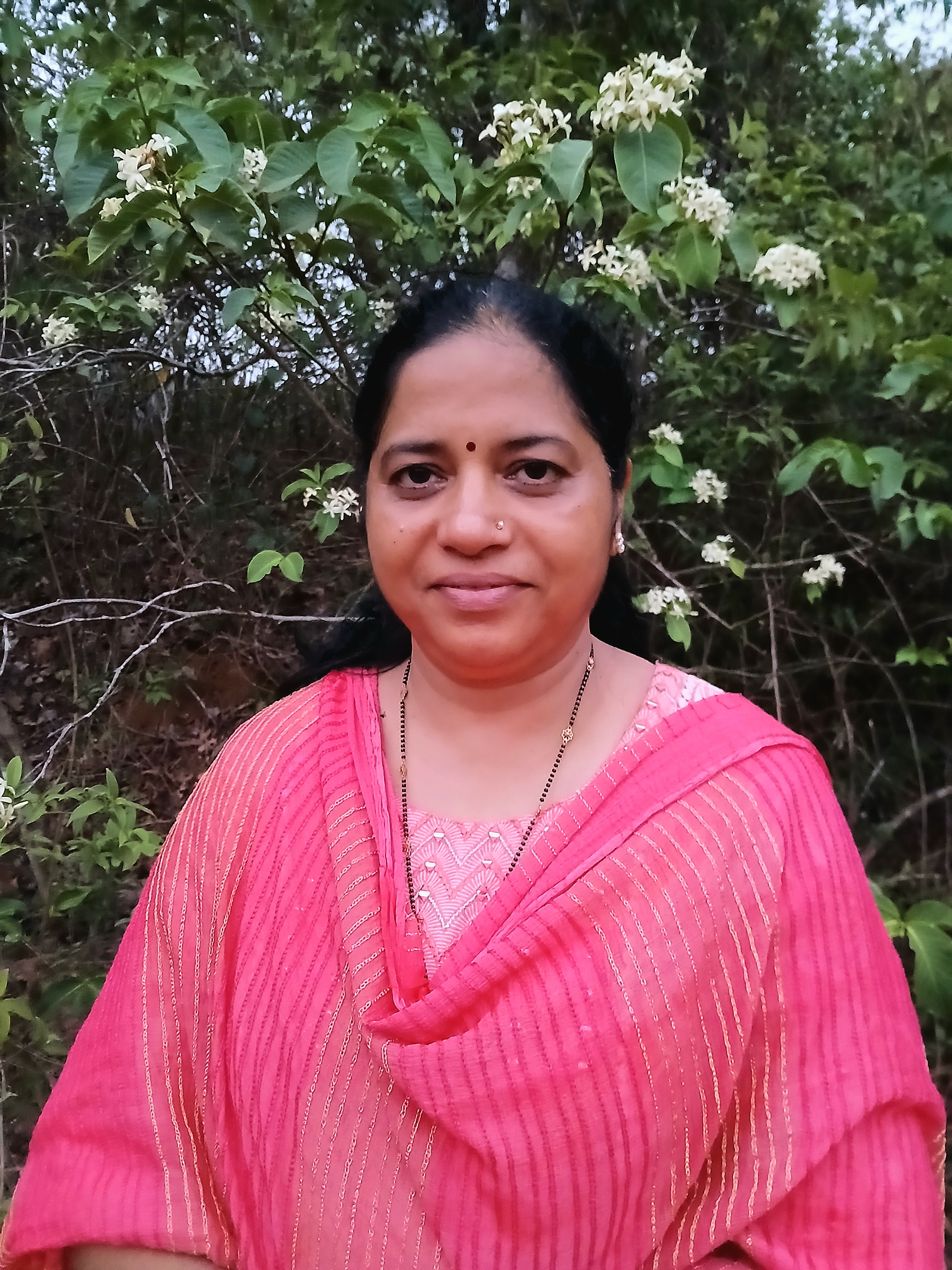
- Kerkar in 2026
- Born: Paliem, Goa, India
- Occupations: Author; folkorist; researcher; teacher
- Spouse: Rajendra Kerkar
- Children: 1

Pournima Rajendra Kerkar is an Indian author, folklorist, researcher and teacher who writes about the eco-cultural heritage and allied stories of Goa and neighbouring regions. She and her husband, Rajendra Kerkar, practice a Gurukul style teaching at their home where students stay and learn with them. She received the Green Teacher Award from the Sanctuary Nature Foundation for contribution in environmental education, conservation and social work. She is a member of the State Level Steering Committee for implementation of National Education Policy 2020. Additionally she is the president of the Vivekanand Sahitya Sanskruti Abhivruddhi Manch.

== Early life ==
Pournima Kerkar was born in Paliem, Goa. Her father was a teacher and she developed interest in the folkculture since her childhood. She holds Masters degree in Konkani and Marathi.

== Career ==
Kerkar practices teaching at Dnyanprakash Mandal Bicholim's Higher Secondary School, Mulgao. Her work includes documentation and promotion of local folklore. She has studied Goan festivals and rituals such as Dhalo, Dhillo, Shigmo, and Aitaar Pujan. She discusses the scientific and ecological basis of festivals celebrated in specifically in Shravan month.

Along with Vivekanand Environment Awareness Brigade, Kerkar advocates for the use of indigenous food sources associated with medicinal plants and wild vegetables through digital platforms. She organised cultural Fiesta in June, 2014 and co-ordinated Purva rang programme for golden jubilee celebration of Kala Academy in 2019. Kerkar scripted and acted in the play "Majhiya Anganat Saye" that showcased the culture, tradition, folksongs, festivals and rural lifestyle of Goa. Besides her documentation, she is a recognised children's rights activist and organises educational camps for children.

Kerkar's marathi book Vismrutichya Umbarthyavar is translated in Hindi as "Chutati Paramparaye" by Vijaya Dixit. Heta Pandit has translated the same book in English as "Objects from Goan Homes".

== Personal life ==
Following her marriage to environmentalist Rajendra Kerkar, she moved to Sattari and resides in Keri village situated at the foothills of Western Ghats. They chose not to send their daughter Samrudhdi to any formal school and instead allowed her to learn on her own. Samrudhdi is a speaker at Tedxtalk.

== Awards and recognition ==
- B. B. Borkar Memorial Award (1999)
- Green Teacher Award, Sanctuary Nature Foundation (2011)

== Selected bibliography ==
=== English Books ===
- Objects from Goan Homes (2026)

=== Marathi Books ===
- Spandan (poetry)
- Govyatil Dhalotsavache Swarup
- Anubandh Lokgangeche
- Vismrutichya Umbarthyavar

=== Hindi Books ===
- Chutati Paramparaye (Translated by Vijaya Dixit)(2023)

=== Konkani Books ===
- Kalij Usavala (2025) Translated into Marathi by Pournima kerkar

== Research Papers ==
- Storyteller of Goa, Subhadra Arjun Gawas
