= Rahul Alvares =

Indian herpetologist and author

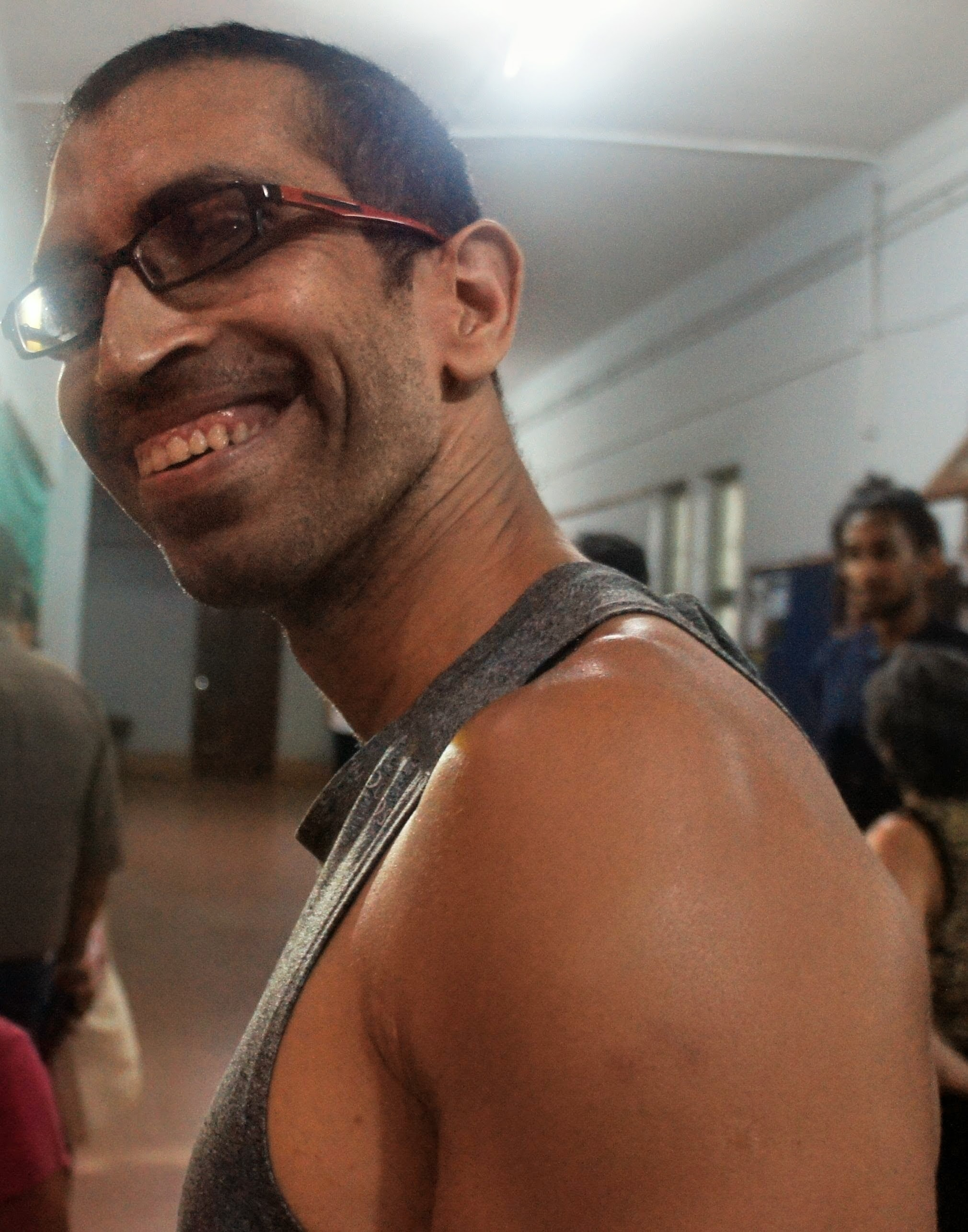
- Born: Goa, India
- Occupations: Herpetologist, wildlife photographer
- Parents: Claude Alvares (father); Norma Alvares (mother)

Rahul Alvares is an Indian herpetologist, author, and wildlife photographer based in Goa. He is known for his work in snake rescue, wildlife conservation, and for his books regarding wildlife and experiential education.

== Early life and education ==
Alvares was born to Norma Alvares and Claude Alvares, an environmental activist. He grew up in Goa.

Following his completion of the 10th grade, Alvares chose to take a one-year hiatus from formal schooling to pursue practical learning. During this period, he volunteered at the Madras Crocodile Bank Trust, where he worked under the mentorship of herpetologist Romulus Whitaker.

== Career ==
=== Herpetology ===
Alvares began his career by rescuing snakes from residential areas. He works as a personal trainer and as a birdwatching guide to earn a living. He is also a wildlife photographer, and has published books featuring his own photos of snakes. He advocates for the coexistence of humans and snakes.

=== Writing ===
Alvares has authored several books based on his experiences with nature and education. In 1999, he published Free From School, a memoir detailing his gap year and experiences at the Madras Crocodile Bank Trust.

In 2003, he released The Call of the Snake, which documents his experiences catching snakes in Goan towns and villages. He has also co-authored Birds of Goa and authored Snakes of Goa.

== Works ==
- Free From School (1999)
- The Call of the Snake (2003)
- Birds of Goa
- Snakes of Goa (2024)
