= The Goenchi Mati Movement =

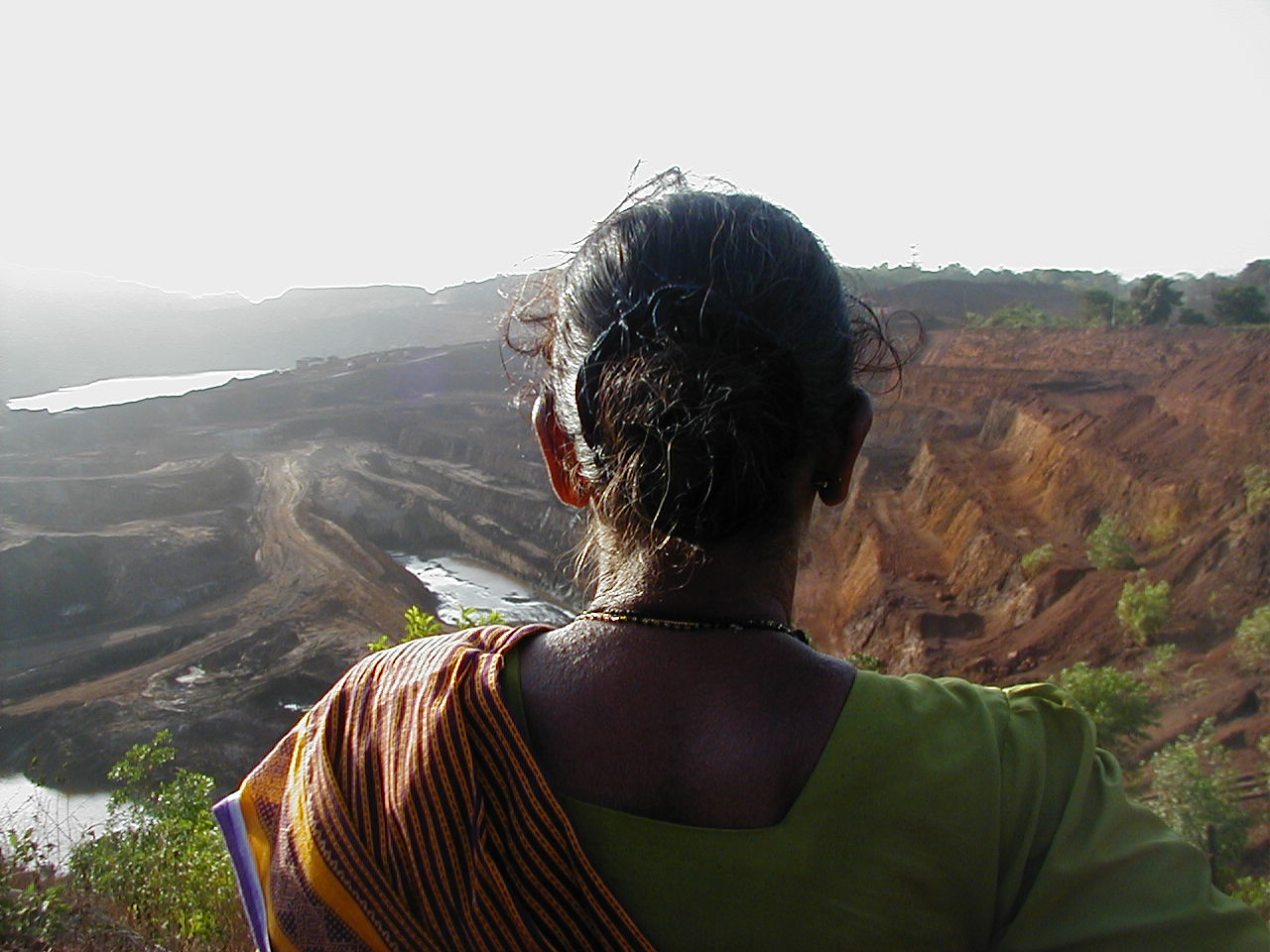
Villager looking at mining devastated areas in Goa, India.

The Goenchi Mati Movement is an environmental campaign over the issue of mining in Goa that has put forth the demand for the setting up of a "Goenchi Mati Permanent Fund" to "preserve our ancestral wealth for future generation". In the local Konkani language, the words "Goenchi Mati" literally means soil of Goa.

== Name, campaign ==
The campaign has been quoted as saying, "We do not inherit the Earth from our ancestors, we borrow it from our children." Its name has also been translated from the Konkani as Goa's land or Goa's earth. The movement was initiated in 2014, and "advocates mining reforms, an issue of massive importance in Goa as it is the largest social and environmental problem in the state."

Rahul Basu of the Goenchi Mati Movement has been quoted as saying, "Our work has mainly revolved around litigation in the Supreme Court. Our manifesto has repeatedly raised the issue of miners’ rights versus the rights of future generations to Goa's minerals."

== Origin ==
Its roots have been traced to the Indian Supreme Court Writ Petition (Civil) 435 of 2012, "which requires the creation of a Goan Iron Ore Permanent Fund." In 2012, the Indian Supreme Court "declared all mining activities in the State illegal as they were being carried out without valid licenses and leases. It also held that any lease grant, including renewals, must adhere to constitutional requirements."

Tiny Goa is one of India's richest iron ore areas, and has exported up to one-third of India's ore exports in some past years. According to the movement, however, "publicly available data shows that for the eight year period 2004-05 till 2011-12, the State of Goa has received less than 5% of the value of its ore (after considering all associated expenses). This works out to a meagre Rs. 2,387 crores when it ought to have captured Rs. 53,833 crores. Quick calculations show that the State of Goa has declining wealth on account of the sale of its natural resources for a pittance."

== Promoters ==
This movement, as well as what it calls the "Ore Chor! 144" campaign, were promoted by the Goa Foundation, an environmental group based in the former Portuguese colony of Goa, now a state on the Indian west coast, "in direct response to mining in Goa." Formed in 1986, the Goa Foundation has spearheaded a number of local environmental issues in Goa, particularly over luxury tourism, mining and the like.

== Outlook and principles ==
The group says it campaign has been based on two principles:

- Non-renewable resources like minerals belong to the people with the state being the trustee
- Future generations should get access to resources that are at least equal to what is available to the present generation

== Campaign demands ==
The campaign demands have included:

- Zero loss Mining: The state of Goa should ensure that the full value of the minerals is captured.
- All mineral receipts be treated as capital receipts. Mineral receipts are to be treated as capital receipts, which will reduce the volatility in government revenue.
- All receipts from minerals be deposited in a Permanent Fund. A permanent fund is sought where the state is the trustee and the future generations are the beneficiaries. The Government Pension Fund of Norway has been pointed to as a model.
- Distribution of fund income as a citizen's dividend. This will create a stake for the citizens in their minerals and leave the state as a non-mineral state, on the lines of the Alaska Permanent Fund#Permanent Fund Dividend.
- Mechanics of implementation. The state can mine and auction off the ore and raise the contract on a per ton basis.

== Brief timeline of mining in Goa ==
- Goa has large deposits of iron ore, and has been extracting and exporting it since Portuguese times (pre-1961).
- 1906 Portuguese decree granting Mining Concessions in Goa, from September 20, 1906.
- 1947: First export of 100 tonnes.
- 1954: Exports rise to a million tonnes.
- 1971: Exports touch 10 million tonnes.
- 1980s: Exports touch 13-15 million tonnes.
- 1987: Parliament enacts the Goa, Daman and Diu Mining Concessions (Abolition and Declaration as Mining Leases) Act 1987 (May 23, 1987) by which all Mining Concessions granted by the erstwhile Portuguese government were treated as Mining Leases. As per this Act, a mining concession has been deemed to be a mining lease under section 4, "the concession holder becomes the holder of such mining leases under the Mines and Minerals Act". Every mining concession specified in the First Schedule of this act shall, be deemed to have been abolished, and is a mining lease granted under the Mines and Minerals Act.
- 2003: Villagers around the mines at Netravali, Sanguem, Goa, shut in 2003 reported "...huge improvement in the quality of stream water and yield of local produce." Cited by, p. 9.
- 2004: The Goa (Prevention of Illegal Mining, Transportation and Storage) Rules 2004.
- 2007 onwards: Extraction ramped up, due to China's economic boom and the subsequent spike in iron prices.
- 2010: Justice M. B. Shah Commission appointed for inquiry of illegal mining of iron ore and manganese (S.O.2817(E)) Nov 22, 2010.
- 2012: Iron ore exports reach a whopping 42 million tonnes per year.
- 2012 The Goa (Prevention of Illegal Mining, Transportation and Storage) Rules 2012
- 2012: Shah Commission says known reserves and extraction rates means iron ore would be exhausted within nine years. It says dumping of waste as a by-product of extraction was causing potentially irreversible environmental damage. The report gave 22 recommendations, many of which related to the lack of intergenerational awareness, and the need for rapid action.
- 2012: Goa Foundation submits a petition which led to the prohibition of new mining activities starting in Goa.
- 2012: Goa's mining operations suspended first by the Goa [BJP] Government on September 10, 2012, after the Justice M. B. Shah Commission Report was tabled in the Parliament three days earlier.
- 2012: Some 139 Environmental Clearances were suspended by the Ministry of Environment and Forests on September 14, 2012, followed by the Supreme Court order for ban on mining operations in the State on October 5, 2012, in the context of the Goa Foundation petition 435/2012.
- 2012: Supreme Court of India ban on mining Interim ban on mining in Goa by the Supreme Court of India in October 2012.
- 2014: Supreme Court of India ban on mining revoked
- 2014: Goenchi Mati Movement begins, advocating for mining reforms
- 2015: BJP, now in government in Goa (and Delhi too), decides to renew the mining leases in Goa; effectively reversing the 2012 ruling. Mining pushed forward in earnest, as there were no restrictions.
- 2017: In Feb, prior to the Goa Assembly Elections, the GMM gains support of the Aam Aadmi Party (AAP) and the Goa Su-Raj Party (GSRP). Its work was also endorsed by British MP John McDonnell

== See also ==
- Save Mollem
- Goa Foundation
