= Shubhada Chari =

Indian author, folklorist and educator

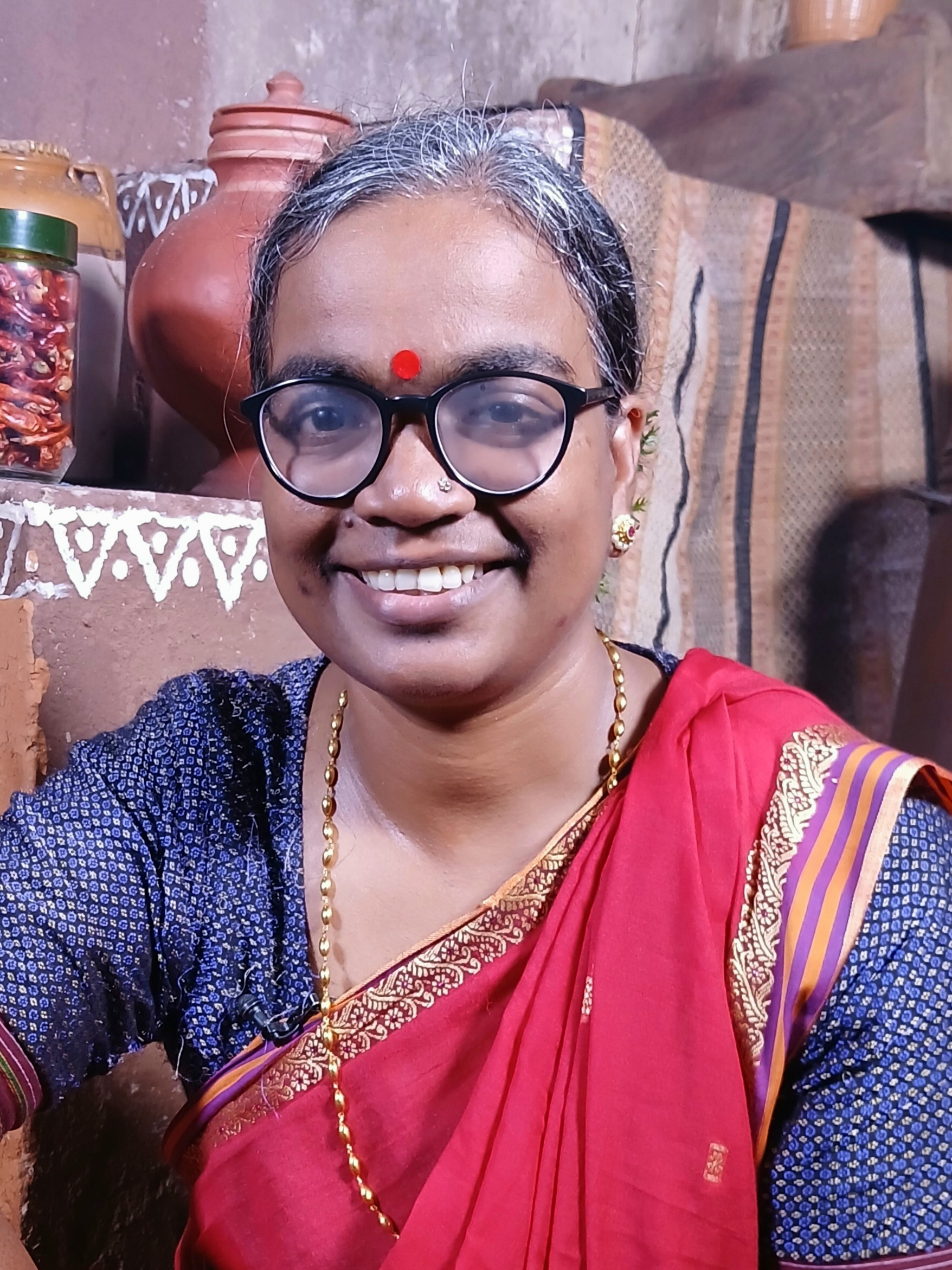
- Shubhada in 2026
- Occupation: Teacher
- Known for: Environmental education
- Notable work: Antarang Mhadayiche (Book)
- Awards: Yuva Pratibha Puraskar

Shubhada Chari is an Indian author, folklorist and teacher, who specialises in riverine culture and folklore of Goa. She was interviewed under the title "Daughter of Rivers".

== Early life and education ==
Chari is a resident of Sal, a village in Bicholim taluka of Goa. She pursued her field studies under the guidance of Goan environmentalist Rajendra Kerkar, staying at his Gurukul, assisting him in documenting the basin of Mhadei river. In 2015, she was awarded "Yuva Pratibha Puraskar" collectively by the Directorate of Art and Culture, Goa and West zone cultural centre, Udaipur for her contribution to folklore. She was a student of History and participated in field discoveries such as ancient stone inscription found at Borde in Bicholim village and Hero stones worshiped at Kuneshwar.

== Career ==
Chari works as a school teacher and is a member of Vivekanand Prerana Pratisthan in Keri. As an environment educator, she has worked alongside the Vivekanand Environment Awareness Brigade (VEAB), directing street plays highlighting various environmental issues including pollution and wildlife protection.

== Folk research ==
She has directed numerous cultural programmes on Doordarshan Goa. As a vocalist and folk researcher, she served as a translator and research assistant to the author Heta Pandit for her book "Grinding stories of Goa". Following her field research on the basin of river Mhadei and its cultural association she wrote a book 'Antarang Mhadeiche"focused on the importance of the Mhadei river, in Marathi language. This publication traces the river course from its upstreams in the Western ghats to its mouth on the west coast of India. The work highlights the history of river system and highlights its role as a lifeline that sustains local communities by providing drinnking water, fish, and transportation. She has written and directed the musical programme "Nadi Vahate" that creates awareness about damming and diversion of river Mhadei. She is a singer and presented folksongs at various programmes. Sunaparanta – Goa centre for arts hosted a programme titled "Grinding stories – songs of Goa" where she performed a play and sung the traditional "Oviyo" songs along with other women.

She has also worked with Kaavi colours and was interviewed as an artist for the feature film on Kaavi art and was interviewed on Doordarshan Goa under the title "Inspiring Enterpreneurs" about her work in promoting the traditional art form of Goa.

Dr. Madhav Gadgil was the chief guest for publication of her book "Dhangar Stree" which highlights the status of Forest Dwelling Communities. Chari documents the wild varieties of vegetables and creates awareness about the traditional way of cooking them. She shares insightful anecdotes along with the stories associated with such vegetables.

== Books ==
- Antarang Mhadeiche, (Marathi)
- Dhangar Stree (Marathi)

== Awards ==
- Yuva Pratibha Puraskar (2015)
- Sahitya Puraskar – Goa Marathi Academy (2022)
