= Rajendra Kerkar =

Indian environmentalist and writer (born 1965)

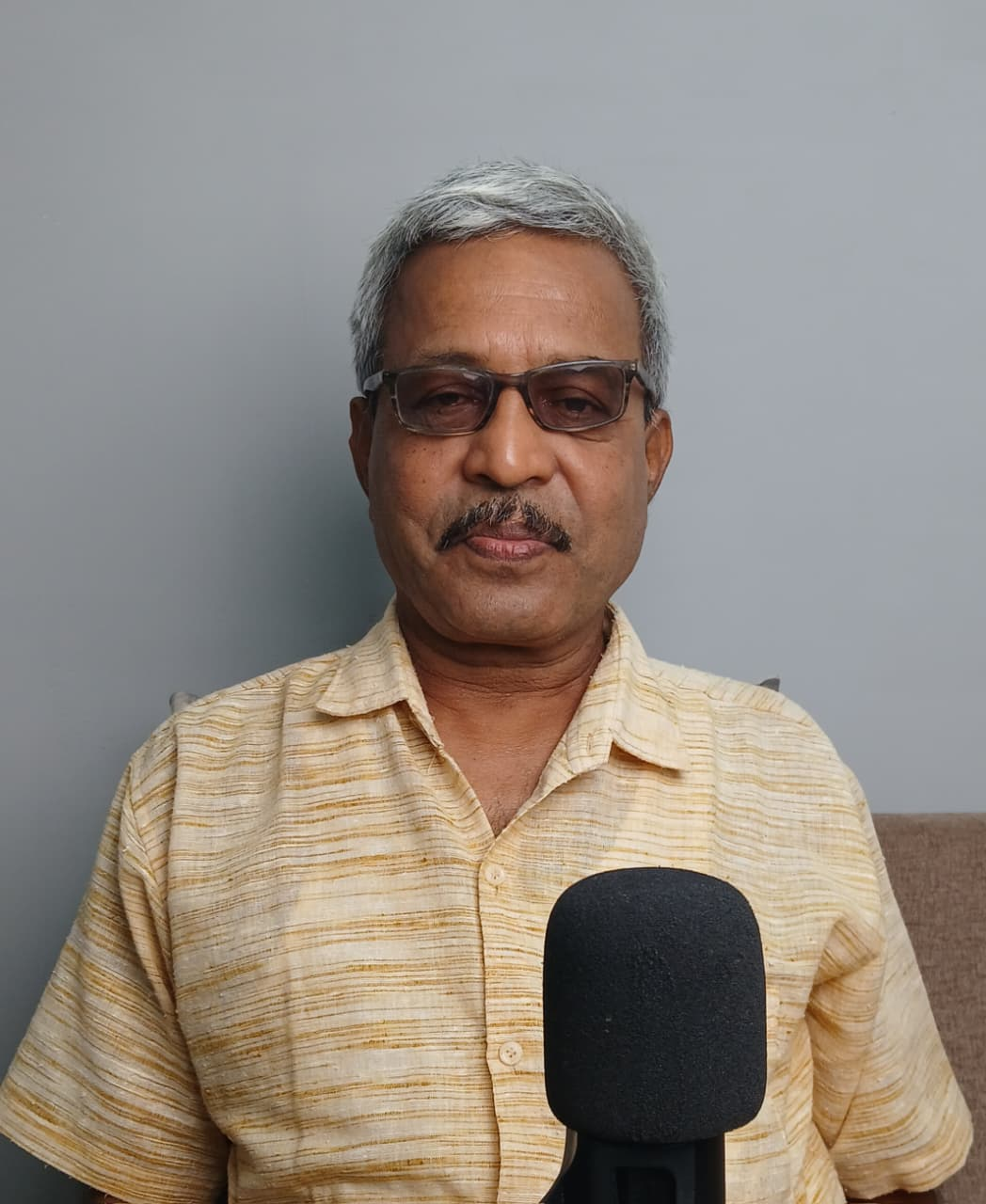
- Kerkar in 2025
- Born: Rajendra Pandurang Kerkar; 1965 (age 60–61); Bicholim, Goa, India
- Occupations: Environmentalist, writer, journalist
- Spouse: Pournima Kerkar

Rajendra Pandurang Kerkar (born 1965) is an Indian environmentalist, author, journalist, and researcher who focuses on writing about the environment of Goa and its neighbouring regions. A former teacher, Kerkar resigned from his profession to focus on Environmental Education. Interestingly, he and his wife, Pournima Kerkar, has transformed their home into a Gurukul, where students learn through observation and experience, by staying with them. He is the secretary of Mhadei Bachao Abhiyan and initiated the movement for the declaration of the Mhadei Wildlife Sanctuary and the Netravali Wildlife Sanctuary, notified in 1999. He has written about the tiger presence in Goa and has proposed the declaration of a tiger reserve in Goa. Additionally, he is the founder of the Vivekanand Vidya Mandir school in Keri, Goa.

== Career ==
Kerkar is the founder of the Vivekanand Environment Awareness Brigade, an NGO dedicated to environment education and conservation. He began spreading the knowledge about environment through news articles and slideshow presentations. He was first nominated as a member of the National Wildlife Board in 2014

In the 1980s, when Kerkar was appointed for North Goa Paryavaran Vahini scheme, he brought to the notice of district magistrate the adverse effects of illegal sand extraction, killing of fish by chemical and explosives. In 1986, he established the Swami Vivekanand Smruti Sangh. From this platform he initiated the movement for cultural, social, educational and environmental awareness.

Kerkar highlighted the need to preserve the origin point of the Mhadei and Zuari rivers. At that time, Goa was under President's rule. Along with Durgesh Kasabekar and the team, Kerkar proposed to then Governor of Goa J. F. R. Jacob that the forests of Sattari and Sanguem should be given the status of wildlife sanctuaries because of the presence of tigers. When Governor asked for the evidence, Kerkar produced the claws of tiger that was found dead in Pissurlem village. Subsequently on 18 May and 31 May 1999, Mhadei and Netravali wildlife santuries were notified, respectively. Kerkar has been featured on Sanctuary Asia magazine as among the Ten Tiger Defenders of India.

When mining activities still continued inside the sanctuaries, Kerkar wrote a series titled Khan Khan Mati in a Marathi newspaper about illegal mining operations and visited the affected areas with his student Arnold Noronha who took photographs. When Goa Foundation filed this information to the High Empowered Committee appointed by Supreme Court of India, it directed to close down the mining operation inside the wildlife sanctuaries. Following this act, his bike was hit by a truck belonging to a mine owner and he escaped with minor injuries.

After almost a decade, on 28 February 2009, another tiger was killed. Kerkar published a newspaper article about this, which led to the investigation and arrest of several locals. During this period, he and his family faced a social boycott.

Kerkar is the thematic expert committee member of Goa State Biodiversity Board and served on a seven member committee formed by the Government of Goa to determine the proposal for inclusion of the Dhangar community in the Scheduled Tribes list. He worked with Heritage society, Goa circle and he documents the heritage of Goa. He wrote various articles on environmental and social impact of several types of mining activities which helped the mining affected villages to argue at public hearing.

In 1995, Kerkar started organising workshops, nature orientation camps in association with World Wide Fund, Goa. In July 1997, along with scientist Nandkumar Kamat, he participated in Goa River Conservation Network, advocating for the protection Goa's riverine ecosystems. When there was opposition to the two wildlife sanctuaries notified in 1999, he organised discussions on its importance along with Vivekanand Smruti Sangh. He assisted researchers to report the Three Redlisted trees from swampy relics of Goa and also helped on field visits to document the species Aponogeton nateshii. He was a member of Thomas committee for identification of private forest.

In 2000, he compiled information about community conserved areas in Goa for Kalpvriksha, Pune headed by Ashish Kothari. He wrote articles about Cultural facets of Goa on Parmal, Magazine of Goa Heritage Action Group from 2005 to 2008. Kerkar worked with Goa Foundation and documented the rivers and sacred groves of Goa for National Biodiversity Strategy Action Plan in 2002 and wrote articles for the book "Fish Curry and Rice" edited by environmentalist Claude Alvares. He wrote an article titled Conserving the Mhadei for the book "The River Mhadei : The science and politics of diversion".

Kerkar has also scripted the award winning Marathi film Devrai produced by Doordarshan Goa. The film Flowing with Mhadei river is based on his research and he selected the locations for video recording. As of 2026, he organises "Parikrama", a monthly trail to explore the heritage and ecology of Goan villages. He was presented a certificate of membership of Roots & Shoots by English primatologist Jane Goodall on behalf of Jane Goodall Institute.

When ecologist Madhav Gadgil with his committee visited Goa to study the Western ghats, Kerkar proposed for declaration of the notified Wildlife sanctuaries as a tiger reserve.

== Personal life ==
Kerkar was born in Bicholim, Goa, and resides with his wife, Pournima, and daughter, Samrudhdi, in Keri village in Sattari taluka. He comes from a family of freedom fighters. His father, Pandurang Dulba Kerkar, served in the Goa Liberation Army and his great-grandfather was involved in the final revolt against the Portuguese rule.

Kerkar spent his childhood traveling several kilometres on the bicycle. When he realised that his family's financial situation was not good, he sold breads, biscuits, ice cream and newspapers to earn money. He began rescuing injured animals including birds and snakes. Kerkar and his wife opted not to send their daughter for formal schooling, instead allowing her to learn on her own from nature.

== Fellowship ==
Kerkar was awarded Braganza Pereira Foundation, Lisbon, Portugal in 2002 through which he prepared monograph of Dhangar Gauly community.

== Awards ==
- Vincent Xavier Verodiano Award (2001)
- Keshav Anant Nayak Smruti Samajsevak Puraskar (2008)
- C.P.R Environmental Education Centre Award For Environmental Education (2009)
- Dr. Anil Awachat Sangharsh Sanman Puraskar (2010)
- Muktangan Mitra Sangharsh Sanman Puraskar (2010)
- Green Teacher Award (2011)
- Green Ambassador of Goa (2012)
- Goraksha Puraskar (2015)
- Arte e cultura award (2015)

== Selected publications ==
=== Books in English ===
- Natural Heritage of Goa
- Sacred Flora of Goa
- Sacred Groves of Goa
- Glimpses of Goa
- The Way We Were
- Jainism in Goa

=== Books in Marathi ===
- Majya Matiche Gayan
- Gandh Maticha
- Vividhatene Natalela Gova
- Mahima
- Valvetihas Sange Vadvadlanchi Kirti

=== Research papers ===
- Gaur, A. S., & Kerker, R. (2007). Stone sculptures of goddesses on the boats from Goa, west coast of India. Bulletin of the Australasian Institute for Maritime Archaeology, 31, 18–25.
