= Save Mollem =

Social movement in Goa, India

- Date: 2020–2021
- Location: Largely in Goa, India
- Also known as: My Mollem; Amchem Mollem
- Cause: Planned deforestation in the Bhagwan Mahaveer Sanctuary and Mollem National Park
- Outcome: Supreme Court-appointed Central Empowered Committee (CEC) recommendation against the three projects

Save Mollem, also known as My Mollem and Amchem Mollem, is a social movement that aimed to protect the planned deforestation in the Bhagwan Mahaveer Sanctuary and Mollem National Park in Goa, India. The movement gained recognition for its involvement by millennials and the unique artwork created to spread awareness.

== Background ==
In December 2019, a newly constituted State Wildlife Advisory Board (SWLAB) met for approximately an hour. They discussed many projects, including:

- the double tracking of the existing railway line
- an electricity transmission line for electricity
- a highway expansion proposal

All of these would affect the Bhagwan Mahavir Wildlife Sanctuary. The projects first came into public view when a wildlife scientist wrote a cover-story in The Hindu in May 2020 that pointed out that two of these projects, the transmission line and the highway, were cleared during the COVID-19 lockdown in India. These projects would require the felling of at least 91 hectares (9,10,000 square meters) of forest. These two also did not carry out a wildlife assessment. While the transmission line had cleared a wildlife assessment, it was contradictory, since scientific consensus agrees that power transmission lines have harmful effects on wildlife.

Reports suggested that the highway and railway expansion would benefit the Mormugao Port Authority, which would be able to increase its coal export capabilities, favouring companies like JSW Group, Vedanta Limited and Adani Group, who export this coal.

The Mollem wildlife sanctuary is part of the Western Ghats, which have been declared as a World Heritage Site by UNESCO. The area in particular is home to 128 varieties of unique species of fauna.

== Timeline of notable events and demonstrations ==
=== 2020 ===
On World Environment Day, 5 June 2020, a group of around 150 scientists, academics, conservationists and concerned citizens from across the country wrote to Union Minister of Forests and Environment (MoEF) Prakash Javadekar. They urged him to reconsider the approvals granted to the three projects that threatened the Bhagwan Mahaveer Wildlife Sanctuary and the Mollem National Park. By this time, the number of trees to be felled were pegged at 55,000.

In the months that followed, students and activists launched online petitions to spread awareness about the issue. They also spread memes on social media, such as Instagram and Twitter. The hashtag #SaveMollem was used as a way to draw attention to the magnitude of the problem. The movement became known for its involvement of millennials. Multiple artworks were also created as part of the movement. They shared that Fridays for Future was one of their inspirations. The movement was also known as "Amche Mollem" and "My Mollem".

On 18 June, 18 scientists wrote to Forest Minister Javadekar, addressing the issue. This was followed by letters from 427 medical and nursing students on 9 July, 159 representatives from the tourism industry on 28 July, and 249 artists on 1 August.

During the one day Goa Legislative Assembly session in July 2020, the Chief Minister of Goa, Pramod Sawant, who also holds the forest portfolio admitted that almost 70,000 trees would be cut down for the three projects. A couple of days after the Assembly session, the Leader of Opposition, Digambar Kamat, wrote to the Central Empowered Committee (CEC) of the Supreme Court stating that he was not in favour of the “dubious forest clearances” given to the three projects. He lamented that the projects were being viewed in isolation, instead of as part of Goa's largest protected area.

On 15 August 2020, on account of Independence Day, multiple protests were held across Goa.

In October 2020, on a visit to Goa, Union Minister for Environment, Forest and Climate Change Prakash Javadekar said at a press conference that he was not aware about the opposition to the three controversial linear projects proposed in and around the protected forests at the Wildlife Sanctuary. He said that he had received no written objections to the projects, despite environmental activists and other various groups from the state sending the Ministry of Environment, Forests and Climate Change dozens of written representations digitally and by post.

A few days later, Curtorim MLA Aleixo Reginaldo Lourenco sent a letter to the Ministry of Environment, as well as the Goa Chief Minister saying that their feigning ignorance on the protests was disturbing to Goans. He reiterated that numerous Goans including students, teachers, architects, artists, scientists, and travel and tourism operators, had written to him over four months on the issue, and that he had written to the Centre over the issue of Mollem being stripped of its green cover.

Around the same time, noted Konkani writer Damodar Mauzo in a video on Mollem, urged Goans to unite and back the people of Mollem in their fight to save the forests from destruction. In the video, he also recited a poem on the ongoing struggle to save the forests penned by a Mollem local Sharaschandra Khandeparkar.

On the night of 1 November 2020, during the COVID-19 pandemic in India, hundreds of people sat on the railway lines passing through Chandor. The protestors included activists, members of different political parties, and citizens of different backgrounds and age groups. Six protestors were charged for unlawful assembly and rioting, despite people stating that the protest was peaceful.

On 7 December 2020, protests were held in Panjim outside the office of the Forest Department in Panaji. Other protestors marched from the Church Square to the Forest Department. Law enforcement officials boarded a privately owned bus carrying protestors and instructed the driver to transport them to a police station. Neola Pereira and others live-streamed this on Instagram, attracting an audience of over 200,000 viewers.

=== 2021 ===
In March 2021, the MoEF granted its approval for the clearing of 140 hectares of forest land for the double-tracking project.

In April 2021, the Supreme Court-appointed Central Empowered Committee (CEC) recommended against the three projects. While the double tracking project was cancelled, the transmission line was recommended to be shifted to an existing 110 KV line, and the highway expansion project was recommended to get an environmental clearance (EC) first.

Also in April 2021, Neola Pereira and other youth organised a flash mob, indulging in a "Jerusalema" dance challenge.

== Reactions ==
Responding to the letters sent to Javadekar, CM Sawant stated, "The opposition to these projects is coming from Africa, England and Russia. Those who have not seen Goa and Mollem are now commenting about it from foreign countries." The Minister for Power in Goa, Nilesh Cabral, stated that the protestors should "first start using solar power" (before complaining about a power transmission line).

== Awards and accolades ==
The Save Mollem campaign was recognised for the Sanctuary Wildlife Service Awards 2021 by Sanctuary Asia magazine.

== See also ==
- The Goenchi Mati Movement
- Goa Foundation
