= Khotachiwadi =

Village in Maharashtra

- Village
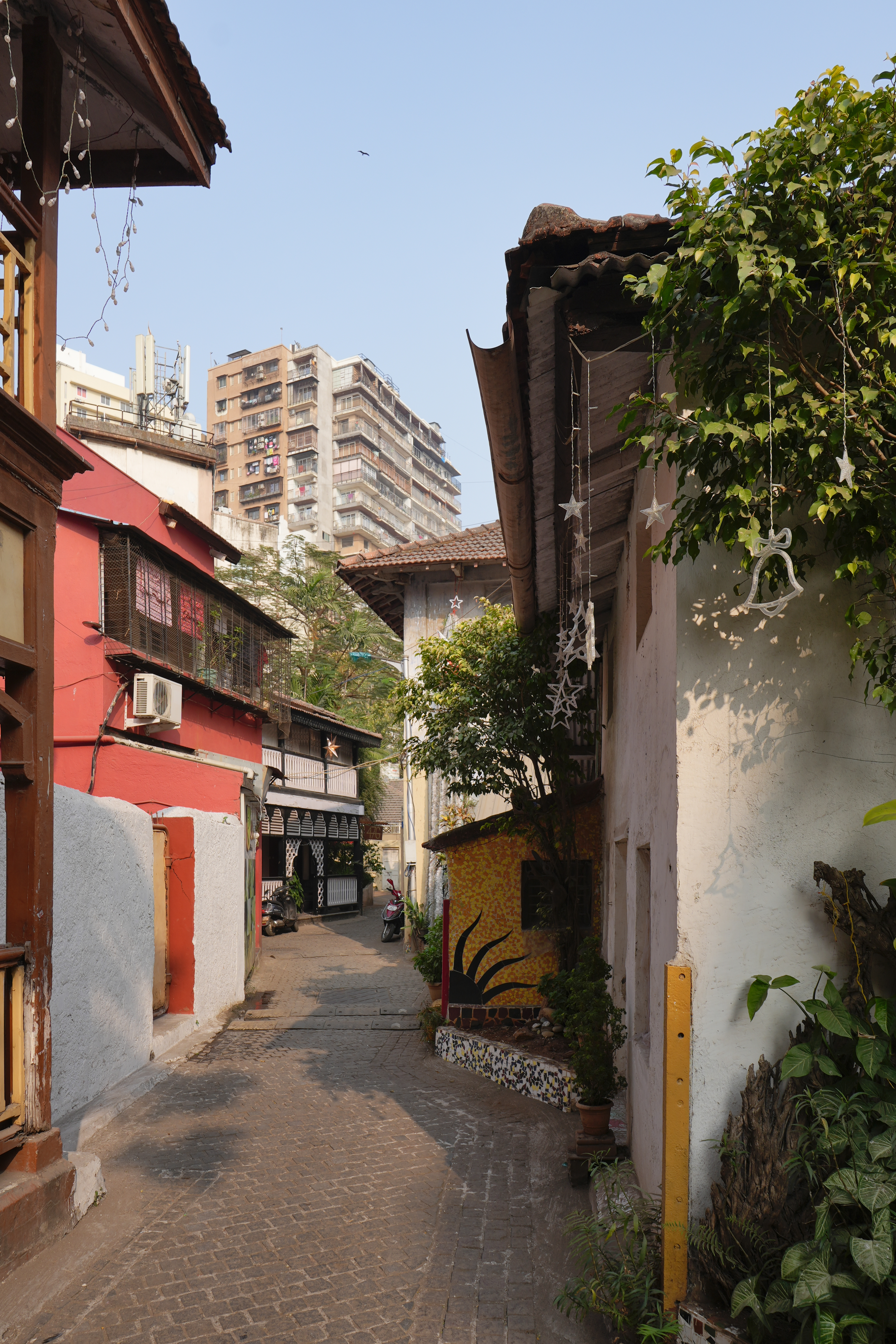
- Lanes and heritages houses of Khotachiwadi
- Nickname: "Old Goa in Mumbai"
- Interactive map of Khotachiwadi
- Coordinates: 18°57′20″N 72°49′13″E
- Country: India
- State: Maharashtra
- District: Mumbai City
- Metro: Mumbai

Government
  - Type: Municipal Corporation
  - Body: Brihanmumbai Municipal Corporation (MCGM)

Languages
  - Official: Marathi
- Time zone: UTC+5:30 (IST)
- PIN: 400004
- Lok Sabha constituency: Mumbai South
- Public transit: Charni Road; Girgaon

Khotachiwadi (lit. 'Khot's wadi (orchard') is a heritage village in Girgaon, Mumbai, India. Houses generally conform to the old-Portuguese style architecture.

== Etymology ==
The name "Khotachiwadi" translates to "Khot's wadi (orchard)". The village was founded in the late 18th century on land owned by Waman Hari ‘Khot’ (local supervisor), a member of the Pathare Prabhu community, who sold plots of the land to local East Indian families. It was also fondly known as 'Old Goa in Mumbai'. There used to be 65 of these houses, now reduced to 28 as old buildings are being pulled down to make way for new skyscrapers.

== Architecture ==
Houses are made of wood, with a large open front verandah, a back courtyard and an external staircase to access the top bedroom.

== Residents ==
Most of the residents now descend from the original inhabitants of Mumbai. Recently Gujarathis, Marwadis have moved into the area. Majority are Maharashtrian Christians.

== Gallery ==
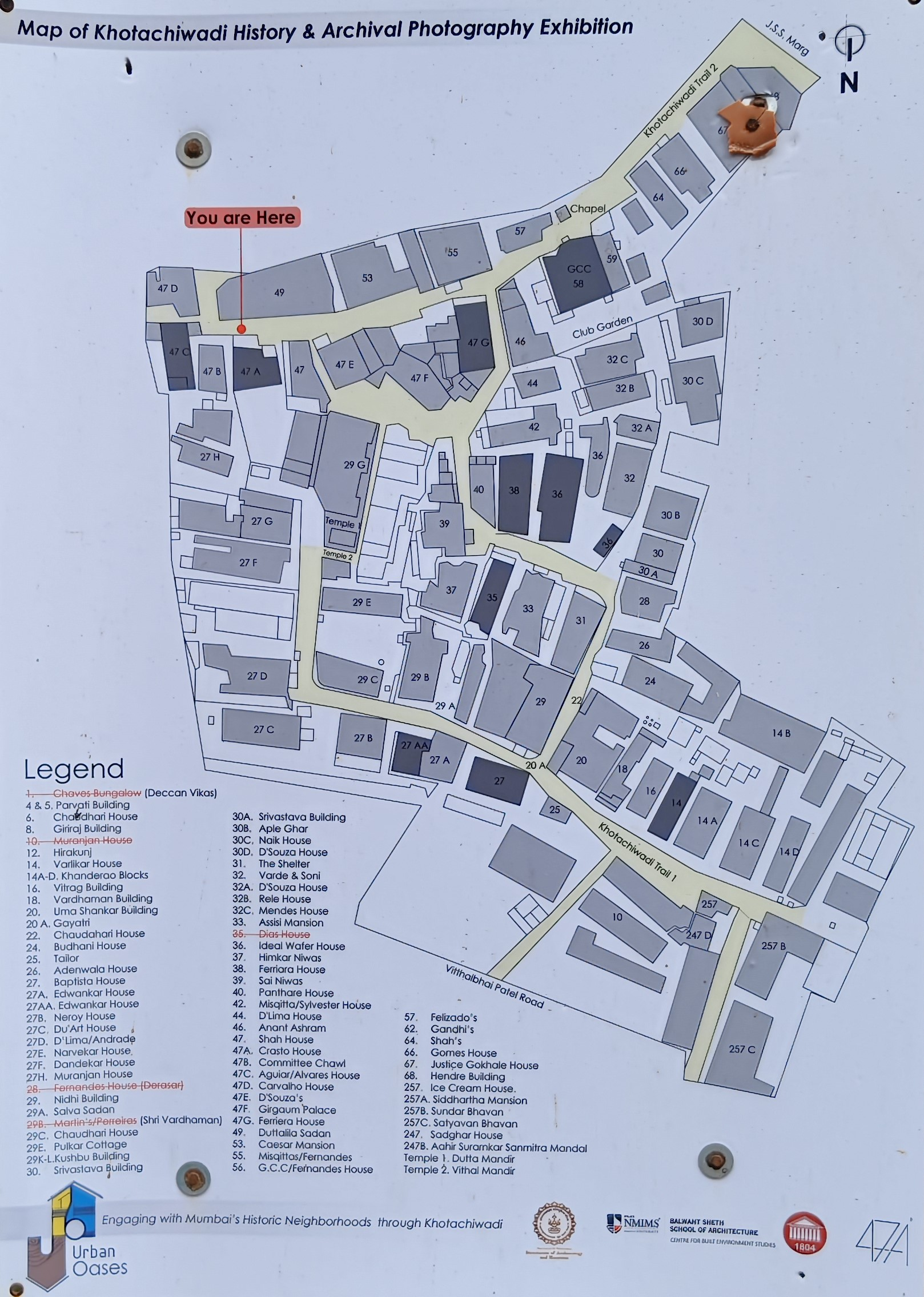
A Map of Khotachi Wadi

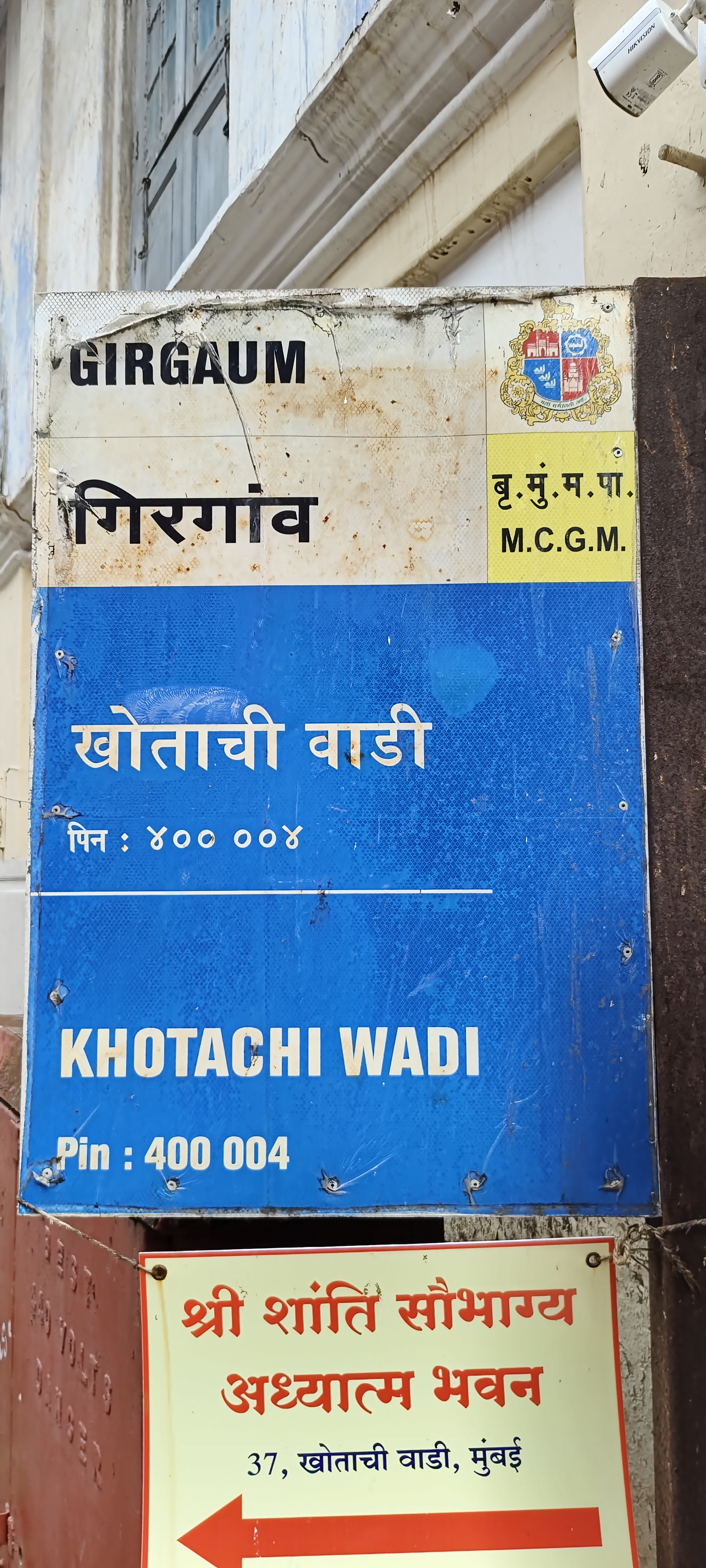
Name board of Khotachi wadi
