= Claude Alvares =

Indian environmentalist

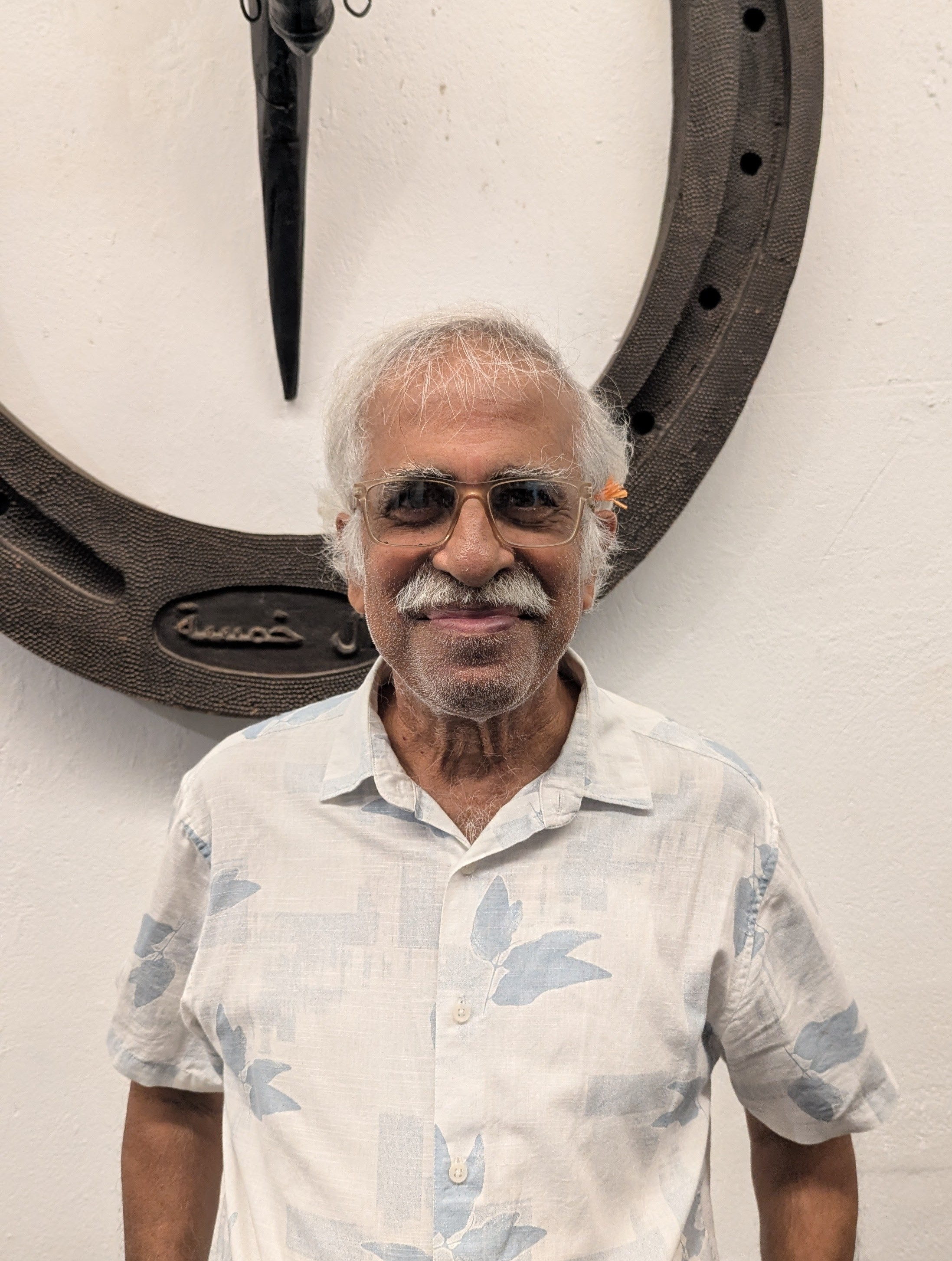
- Alvares in 2025
- Born: Claude Alphonso Alvares; 1947 or 1948 (age 78–79); Bombay, Bombay Presidency, Dominion of India
- Education: St. Xavier's College; Eindhoven University of Technology (Ph.D.)
- Occupations: Environmentalist, Author, Editor
- Known for: Goa Foundation, Other India Press
- Spouse: Norma Alvares (m. 1977)
- Children: 3, including Rahul Alvares

Claude Alphonso Alvares (born 1947 or 1948) is an Indian environmentalist based in Goa. He was the editor of the Other India Press and Director of the Goa Foundation, an environmental monitoring action group that has filed successful public interest litigation cases. Alvares was a member of the Goa Coastal Zone Management Authority of the Ministry of Environment and Forests (MoEF). He was also a member of the Supreme Court High Level Committee on Hazardous Waste (1997–2000) and the Supreme Court Monitoring Committee (SCMC) on Hazardous Wastes constituted by the Supreme Court of India (2000–2007).

== Early life ==
Alvares was born in Bombay, Dominion of India to Mangalorean Catholic parents. He grew up in Khotachiwadi and attended St. Xavier's College, where he met his future wife Norma. In 1976, Alvares completed a PhD from the School of Philosophy and Social Sciences at the Eindhoven University of Technology. He and his family moved to Goa in 1977. After starting a short-lived rural development project, Alvares began writing for The Illustrated Weekly of India while Norma studied law. She completed her degree in 1985.

== Goa Foundation ==
In 1986, the Parliament of India passed the Environmental Protection Act. Together with like-minded Goans, the Alvares founded the Goa Foundation in that same year to increase societal awareness and combat evasion of the new environmental standards. In 1987, the Foundation filed its first public interest litigation case against sand miners who were causing erosion of the local beaches; represented in court by Adv. Ferdino Rebello, the Foundation was successful in halting this activity. The Foundation also filed cases against Ramada and other beach resort developers who were flouting building codes.

== Other activism ==
Alvares has campaigned against genetically modified crops. His 1986 Illustrated Weekly of India article "The Great Gene Robbery" criticized the U.S.-funded International Rice Research Institute's program to replace indigenous crop varieties with their own less-robust ones. He also opposed Monsanto's attempts to market genetically modified versions of vegetables such as brinjal.

Alvares founded the Other India Bookstore in Mapusa during the 80's; in 1990, he also founded Other India Press to publish books on organic farming, homeschooling, and the environment.

== Personal life ==
Alvares lives in Parra, Goa, with his wife, Norma Alvares, an environmental lawyer whom he married on 15 October 1977. The couple have three sons, Rahul, a herpetologist, Samir, and Milind.

== Bibliography ==
=== Author ===
- Homo faber: technology and culture in India, China and the West from 1500 to the present day, The Hague [etc.]: Nijhoff, 1980, New edition: The Hague [etc.]: Nijhoff, 2007 - Indian edition: De-Colonizing History: Technology and Culture in India, China and the West: 1492 to the Present Day, - The Other India Press, Goa, 1991 - Paperback Edition: Decolonizing History: Technology and Culture in India, China and the West 1492 to the Present Day, Apex Press, 3rd edition 1991, ISBN 0-945257-40-6
- "The Great Gene Robbery", published in the Illustrated Weekly of India in 1986.
- "Science", in: The Development Dictionary, ed. by Wolfgang Sachs, London and New Jersey: Zed Books, 1992, pp. 219–232
- Science, development and violence. the revolt against modernity, Delhi [etc.]: Oxford University Press, 1992
- "Goa may be worse than Bellary", Deccan Herald, Bangalore, 2 October 2011

=== Editor ===
- Another Revolution Fails: Investigation into How and Why India's Operation Flood Project Went Off the Rails, Ajanta Publications 1987, ISBN 81-202-0118-3
- Unwanted guest: Goans v/s Du Pont, Mapusa: Other India Press, 1991
- (with Merryl Wyn-Davis) The Blinded Eye: 500 Years of Christopher Columbus, Other India Press, 1993
- Organic Farming Source Book, Other India Press, 1996
- Fish Curry and Rice - a source book on Goa, its ecology and life-style, 4. rev. ed., Mapusa: Goa Foundation, 2002, ISBN 81-85569-48-7
- Multiversity: Freeing Children from the Tyranny of Schooling, Other India Press, 2006, ISBN 81-85569-64-9

== See also ==
- Science and technology studies in India
