= Norma Alvares =

Indian advocate and social worker (born 1951)

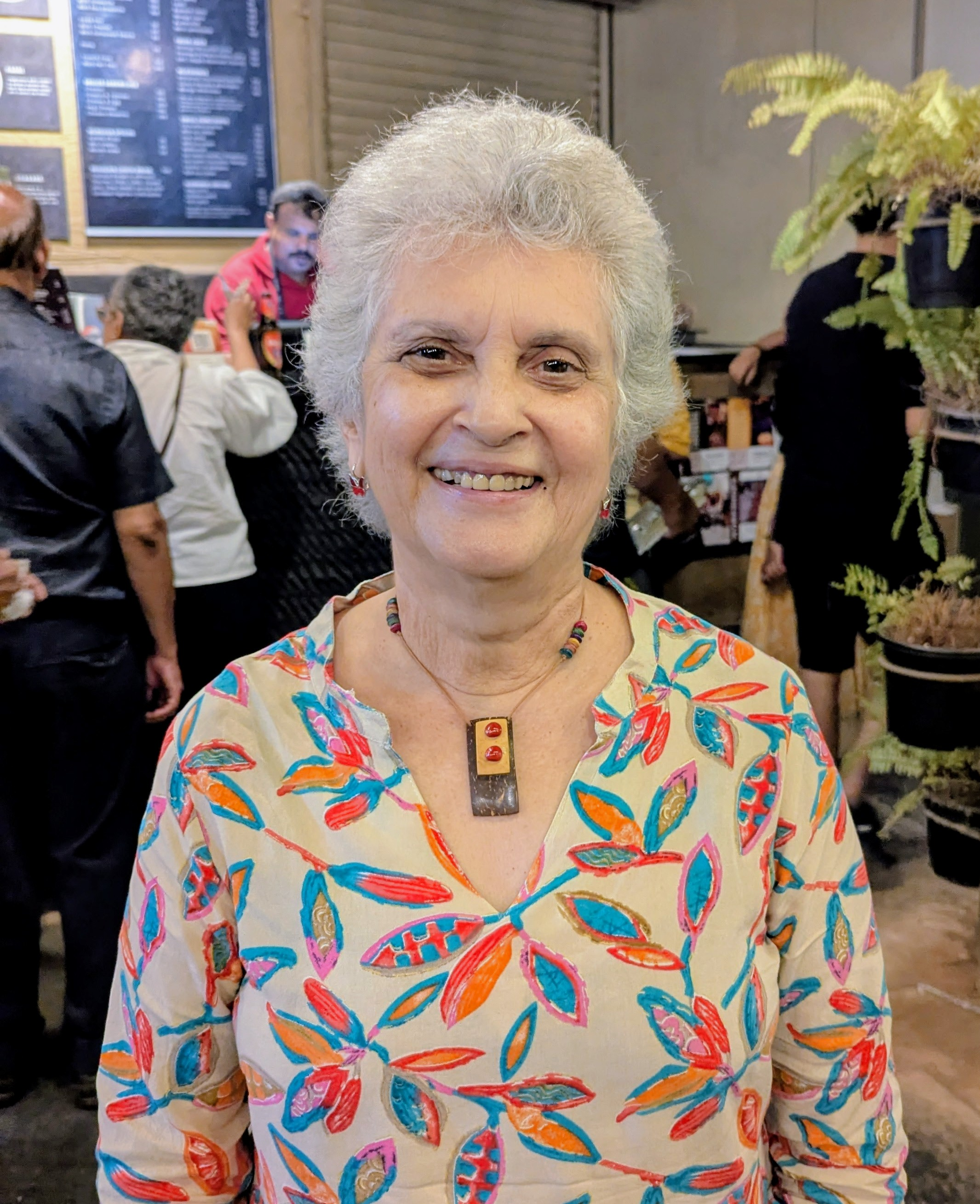
- Alvares in 2025
- Born: 28 April 1951 (age 75); Bombay, Bombay State, India
- Occupations: Advocate; social worker; environmental activist
- Known for: Goa Foundation
- Spouse: Claude Alvares (m. 1977)
- Children: 3, including Rahul Alvares
- Awards: Yashadamini Puraskar (2001); Padma Shri (2002)

Norma Alvares (born 28 April 1951) is an Indian senior advocate, social worker and environmental activist based in Goa.

== Early life ==
Norma Alvares was born on 28 April 1951 in Bombay, Bombay State, India. She graduated in law from St. Xavier's College, Mumbai and entered environmental activism.

== Career ==
Under the aegis of the environmental action group Goa Foundation that was started by Alvares' husband, Claude, she initiated a public interest litigation (PIL) in 1987 to save the sand dunes of Goa, the first ever PIL filed in the state. She has been involved in over 100 PILs and has served as an amicus curiae.

Her efforts are reported in winning a favourable court order for blocking a DuPont factory and in another one which restricted the mining activities in Goa. She is the president of the Goa branch of People for Animals and is the founder of Other India Book Store and Other India Press.

Alvares was designated as Senior Advocate by the Bombay High Court in 2024.

== Personal life ==
She married Claude Alvares, an environmentalist, on 15 October 1977. The couple currently resides in Parra, Goa with their three sons, Rahul, a herpetologist, Samir, and Milind.

== Awards and accolades ==
Alvares was honored by the Government of India, in 2002, with the fourth highest Indian civilian award of Padma Shri. The Government of Goa honoured her with the Yashadamini Puraskar in 2001.
