= Thomas Mohan =

Wildlife photographer

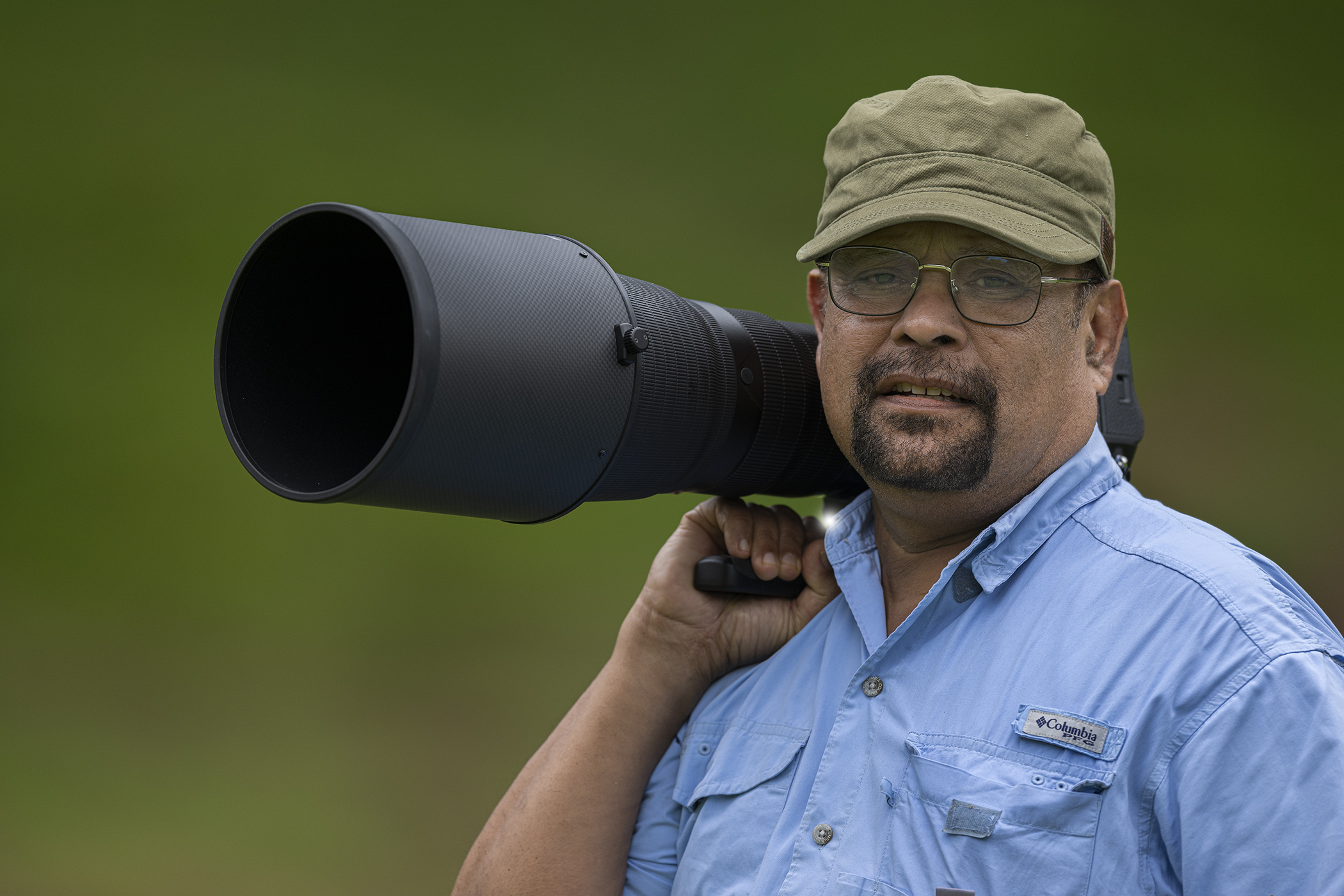
- Born: Bangalore, India
- Occupations: businessman and Wildlife photographer
- Years active: 2015 - Present
- Website: www.mohanthomasphotography.com

Thomas Mohan (born 1959) is a wildlife photographer and civil engineer. He has travelled around the world for his passion for photography.

He is a civil engineer born and raised in Bangalore, India. Hailing from a photography family he started photography at the very young age with a Yashica box camera.

He is a Nikon Expertive, and a Managing Partner of Canon group.

Thomas Mohan was self-taught. He uses Nikon D6, D850, D4s bodies and Lenses 600 f4, 400 f2.8, 300 f2.8, 70-200 f 2.8,24-70 f 2.8, 14-24 f2.8, 105 f2.8 for his photography.

== Awards ==
- Muthukulam Raghavan Pillai Award, 2015
- DCP Photographer of the year for 2015 and 2016
- FIAP Biennial World Cup Gold Medalist
