= Other India Press =

Indian publishing house

Other India Press is a small alternative publishing house and bookstore in Mapusa, Goa, India. It deals mainly in environmental, alternative and Third World books, and sells the same mainly by mail order. Though little known in Mapusa itself, it is widely popular in alternative circles across India and beyond, and has a very useful selection of alternative books and also Goa-related books.

== Other India, OIP, OIB ==
Norma Alvares, one of the founder of this network with a group of others, formed an NGO (non-governmental organisation) called Other India, "to market and publicise alternatives in education, health-care, the environment and other fields."

The OIP (and its sister Other India Bookstore) was located at Goa, India. OIB, or the Other India Bookstore, says it offers the "most complete range of books on Goa, environmental issues, and alternative books from India". The Other India Bookstore closed in March 2022 due to the loss in revenue after the Covid-19 pandemic and the conversion of many other booksellers to digital sales.

== Fish, Curry and Rice ==
One of its publications is Fish Curry and Rice, a guide to environmental issues in the fast-changing small state of Goa. It incorporates information that, according to the OIB, makes it "a comprehensive sourcebook on Goa, its ecology and life-style."
