= Goa Foundation =

Environment organisation

- Formation: 1986
- Founder: Claude Alvares and Norma Alvares
- Type: Non profit organization
- Headquarters: Panjim, Goa
- Publication: Fish, Curry And Rice
- Website: goafoundation.org

The Goa Foundation an Indian environmental organisation based in Panaji, Goa. It was founded by the husband and wife Dr. Claude Alvares and Adv. Norma Alvares in 1986. It is specialised in taking legal course of action for protection of Goa's environment.

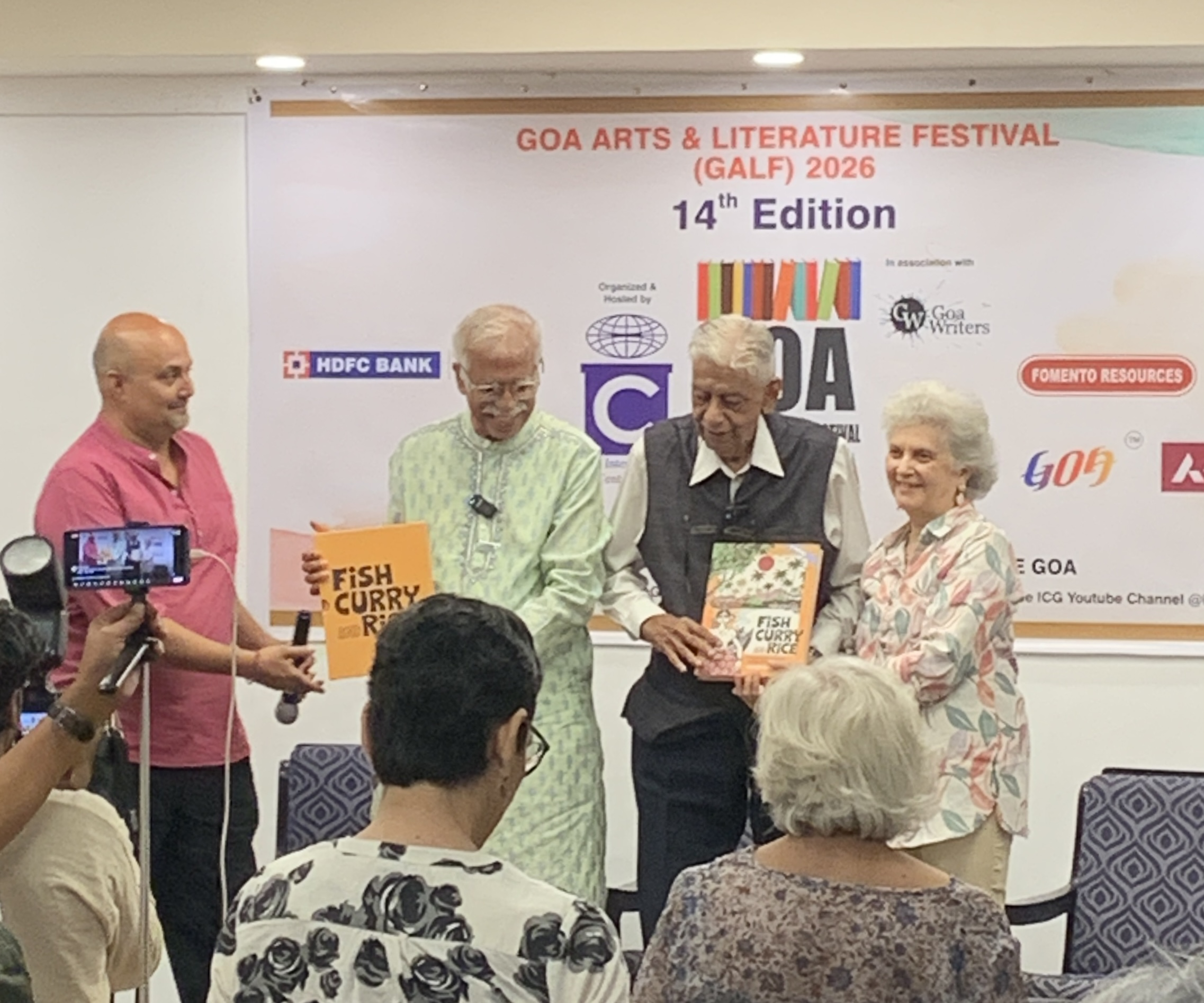
Public launch of the supporters edition of Fish Curry And Rice at the Goa Art And Literature Festival 2026. Standing (Left to Right): Vivek Menezes, Claude Alvares, Edgar Ribeiro and Norma Alvares

== Work areas ==
The office of the Foundation is also known as "Citizen's Hub" and is situated at the unique place known as the "cut of the hill" or Corte do Oiteiro in Panaji.

Dr. Claude Alvares is the Director of Goa Foundation. His wife, Senior advocate Norma Alvares has led the foundations legal battle.

The foundation fought hundreds of legal battles in High court and Supreme court on issues such as mining devastation, protection of forest and unplanned urbanisation.

In 1987, she filed first PIL on behalf of Goa Foundation challenging the granting of mining leases for sand extraction on the beaches. The Foundation has completed 40 years and shaped the public discourse around valuing the environment and human connection.

The efforts of the Foundation resulted in the Supreme court of India issuing a ban on the illegal mining in Goa.

It today holds influence with the judiciary, government and the general public, having persisted with its environmental agenda for nearly four decades with over 300 Public Interest Litigations across the National Green Tribunal,Bombay High Court and Supreme Court of India.

== Environment Education ==
Management of Solid Wastes: The Foundation continues to work on specific environmental problems facing the state of Goa including the management and handling of solid wastes; for these projects, it has been supported by the Goa government and the UNDP Small Grants Project. Its most recent project in this direction is the removal of plastic litter from the Goan environment.

The Foundation has been nominated to the Goa State Coastal Zone Management Authority and to the Supreme Court Monitoring Committee on Hazardous Wastes (which is an all-India responsibility).

The National Green Tribunal (NGT) has given clearance to the application given by the Goa Foundation for the construction of the Tiracol bridge. the Tribunal pointed out that the construction will be monitored by state agencies for the safekeeping of the set environmental guidelines.

== Fish, Curry And Rice ==
In 1993, the foundation published citizen's report of Goa's ecology and environment called "Fish curry and rice". More than 80 public interest litigations were filed in the High court and Supreme court by 2006. The book is edited by Claude Alvares and features the work of over 170 community contributors and is currently in its 5th edition which has been released at the Goa Arts and Literature Festival 2026 by Former Chief Planner of the Govt of India Edgar Ribeiro on 14 February 2026.

== Public Interest Litigation Repository ==
The foundation is currently digitizing its extensive library of over 300 Public Interest Litigations it has been involved with on Internet Archive for public access. The PIL catalogue and archived petition documents can be browsed on the Goa Foundation PIL Repository

== Public interest law course ==
The foundation advocates for the use of PILs as an effective tool for forcing the state to enforce existing laws to protect the environment. The foundation organizes a series of public workshops every two years in Goa to activate citizens in effective use of PILs. The 2024 workshop lectures can be viewed on YouTube: Public Interest Law Course.

== See also ==
- The Goenchi Mati Movement
- Save Mollem
