= H. N. Shubhada =

Dr. H.N Shubhada is an educationalist from Bangalore. She is the winner of 13 National Awards from NCERT and Kittur Rani Chennamma Award from S. M. Krishna, former Chief Minister of Karnataka for her educational research on special children. She is the co-founder of Bhandhavya Education Trust which is the first of a kind Integrated School in Karnataka.

== Works ==
- Nelada Nakshatragala Nantu (ನೆಲದ ನಕ್ಷತ್ರಗಳ ನಂಟು), Stree (ಸ್ತ್ರೀ) and Nanna geleye Gibran (ನನ್ನ ಗೆಳೆಯ ಗಿಬ್ರಾನ್).
