= Vivekanand Environment Awareness Brigade =

Vivekanand Environment Awareness Brigade (VEAB)
- Founded: 04-10-2001
- Founder: Rajendra Kerkar
- Type: Non-governmental organization
- Headquarters: Keri, Sattari, Goa, India
- Region served: Western Ghats
- Fields: Environment, Wildlife Conservation
- Publication: Sacred Flora of Goa
- Website: https://veabgoa.com/

Vivekanand Environment Awareness Brigade (VEAB) is an environmental organisation based in Keri, Sattari, in the North Goa district of Goa, India. Founded on 4 October 2001, by environmentalist Rajendra Kerkar, the organisation focuses on environmental education, wildlife conservation and animal rescue operations across Goa and the adjoining Western Ghats region.

== History ==
VEAB is a non-governmental organization founded by Indian environmentalist Rajendra Kerkar. In 1986, he established the Swami Vivekanand Smruti Sangh, which eventually led to founding the Vivekanand Environment Awareness Brigade (VEAB) in 2001 in Keri village situated at the foothills of Western Ghats. This organisation conducts various activities to educate the public on the flora and fauna of Goa and highlight the importance of conserving it.

Rajendra Kerkar : Founder of Vivekanand Environment Awareness Brigade

The volunteers of the Brigade have monitored the movement of Tiger across forested areas of Goa including Mhadei Wildlife Sanctuary through pugmarks, faeces and kill reports. The e-book was also released on International Tiger Day to highlight the ecological, cultural and legal aspects of conservation of Tiger. The brigade is also active in the rescue of the wild animals.

Besides conducting physical programmes, the Brigade acts as a publisher of books.

== Advocacy ==
In 2008, when Karnataka Government began canal excavation to dam and divert the Mhadei river, VEAB submitted an application to the Central Empowered Committee highlighting its adverse effects on wildllife and the surrounding Western Ghats region.

== Environmental awareness ==
The Brigade organizes field visits, naturalist training workshops through camps, plantation drives for school students, bird watching programs, night trails and visual presentations. Adventure activities like rock climbing and trekking were also organised in the past. Along with Kerkar, the Brigade presented cultural programs based on subjects related to plants and wildlife. The Brigade worked for a decade to promote use of biodegradable materials to reduce the plastic pollution. The street plays are conducted annually alongside pamphlets distribution to discourage the use of firecrackers during the celebration of festivals. In 2018, the Brigade started conducting street plays in various towns of Goa, highlighting the issues of Plastic pollution, Human-wildlife conflict directed by Shubhada Chari. At the same time the volunteers carry out Cleanliness drives and use steel tiffin for carrying food, leaf wrapping for collecting fish and cloth bags for daily purchase as an alternative for plastic.

== Species documentation ==
In 2010, the Brigade found rare amphibians called Caecilian for first time in Goa. Subsequently, the Bombay Natural History Society and two British researchers visited the place for documentation.

== Publications ==
1. Sacred Flora of Goa is the book authored by Rajendra Kerkar, published by Vivekanand Environment Awareness Brigade (2022).
2. Tiger - Guardian of Goa's Forest (2024).
