= Dudh Sagar Water Falls railway station =

Railway station in Goa, India

Dudhsagar waterfalls Railway Station

General information
- Location: Dudhsagar Falls, Goa; India
- Coordinates: 15.3128°N 74.3127°E
- Elevation: 274 metres (899 ft)
- System: Indian Railways station
- Owner: Indian Railways
- Operator: South Western Railway zone
- Line: Guntakal–Vasco da Gama section
- Platforms: 1
- Tracks: 2
- Connections: Auto stand

Construction
- Structure type: Standard (on-ground station)
- Parking: No
- Cycle facilities: No

Other information
- Status: Functioning
- Station code: DWF
- Zone(s): South Western Railway zone
- Division(s): Hubli

Services
| Preceding station | Indian Railways | Following station |
|---|---|---|
| Sonalium towards ? | South Western Railway zone Guntakal–Vasco da Gama section | Dudh Sagar towards ? |
Location

Dudhsagar Waterfalls Railway Station (Station code: DWF) is a small railway station in Kushavati district, Goa. It serves the Dudhsagar Falls. The station consists of a single platform. The platform is not well sheltered. It lacks many facilities, including water and sanitation. This station is one of three in the Braganza Ghats.

== Nearest railway stations ==
- Dudh Sagar
- Sonalium
- Kulem
- Madgaon
- Vasco da Gama
