= Mahadev Temple, Tambdi Surla =

12th-century Hindu temple in Goa, India

Mahadev Temple
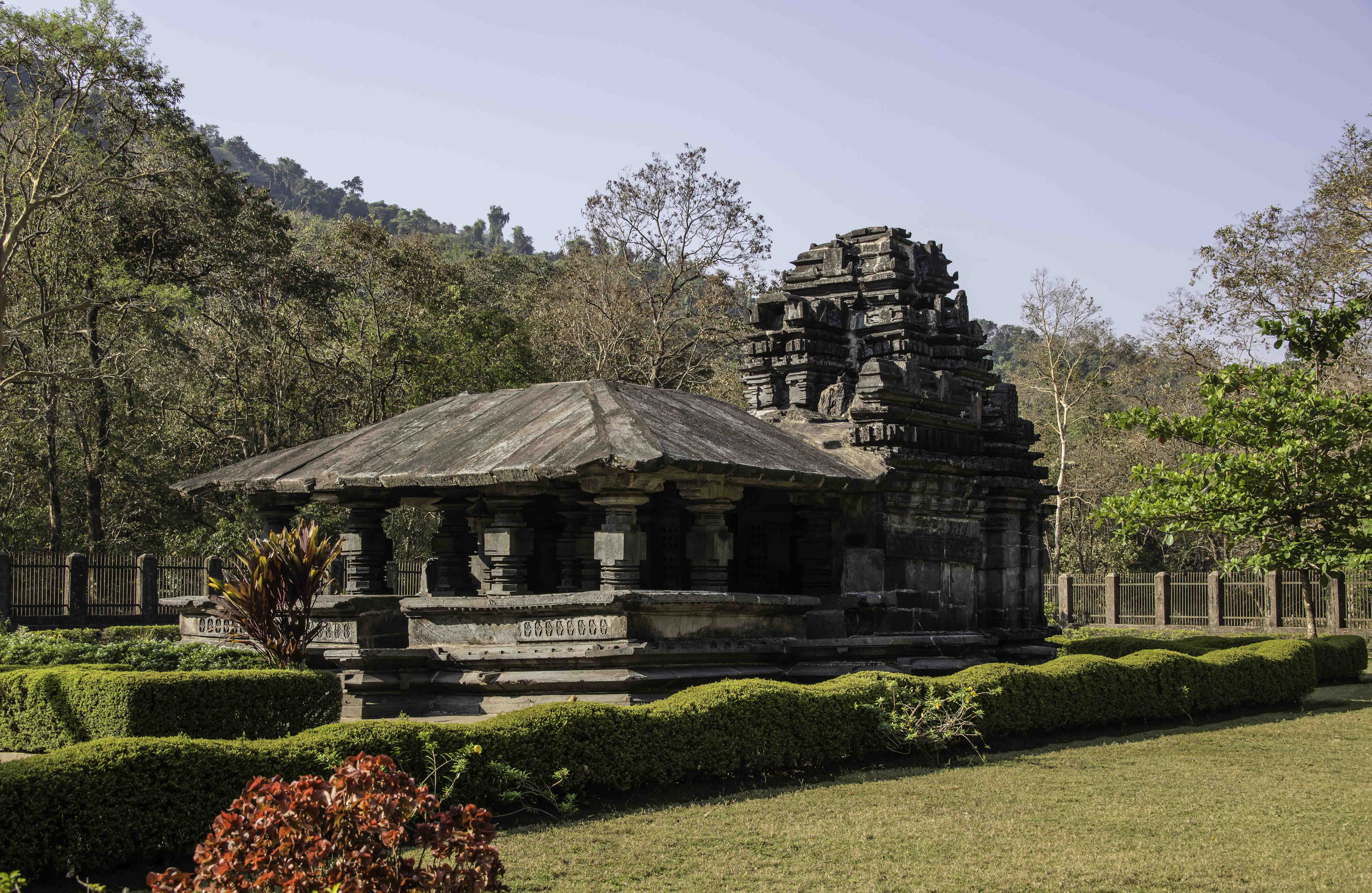
- Shri Mahadev Temple, Tambdi Surla, Goa

Religion
- Affiliation: Hinduism
- Deity: Mahadeva (Shiva)

Location
- Location: Tambdi Surla, Goa
- Country: India
- Interactive map of Mahadev Temple

Architecture
- Style: Kadamba
- Established: 12th century CE

Mahadeva Temple, Tambdi Surla is a 13th-century Hindu temple in the Kadamba style dedicated to Lord Shiva, one of the main deities in Hinduism, and is an active place of Hindu worship. It is an ASI protected Monument of National Importance in Goa. The temple is dedicated to Lord Shiva and is reminiscent of the temples at Aihole in neighbouring Karnataka.

== History ==
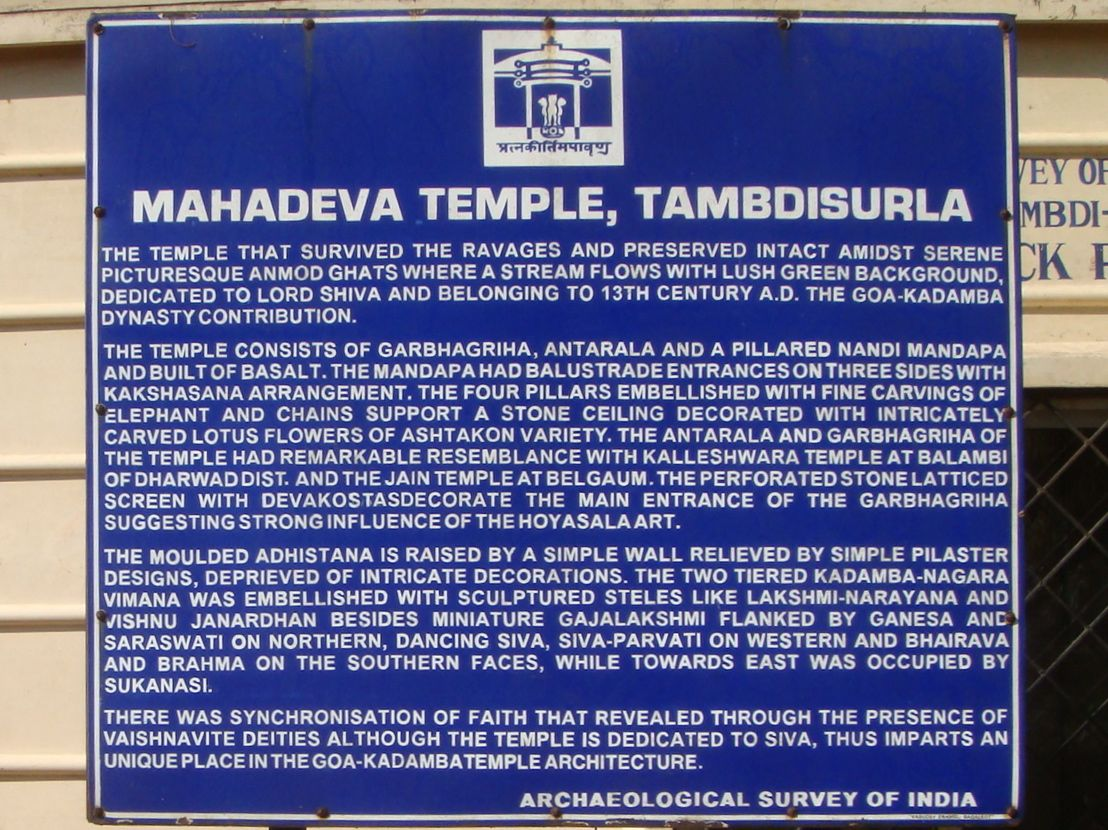
Mahadeva Temple sign, Archaeological Survey of India

The temple was built in the Kadamba style from basalt, carried across the mountains from the Deccan Plateau and carved by craftsmen. It is considered to be the only specimen of Kadamba architecture in basalt stone preserved and available in Goa. The temple survived the Islamic invasions and the Goa Inquisition, due to its remote location in a clearing deep in the forest at the foot of the Western Ghats which surround the site.

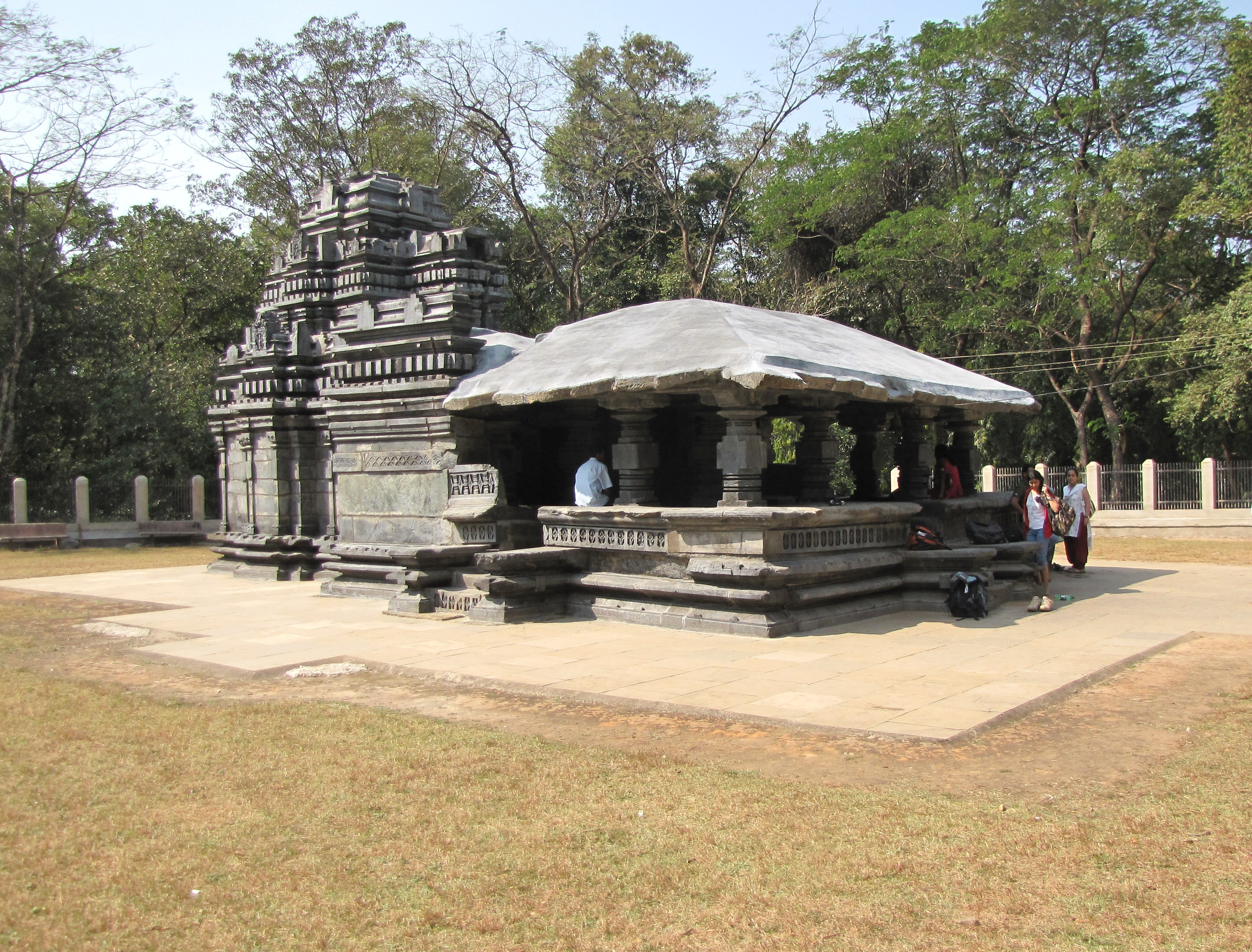
Mahadev Temple, Tambdi Surla

== Religious significance and decoration ==
The temple is dedicated to Lord Shiva and is reminiscent of the temples at Aihole in neighbouring Karnataka. There is a linga (symbol of Lord Shiva) mounted on a pedestal inside the inner sanctum, and local legend has it that a huge king cobra is in permanent residence in the dimly lit interior.

The temple consists of garbhagriha, antarala and a pillared Nandi mandapa built of basalt. The four pillars, embellished with intricate carvings of elephants and chains support a stone ceiling decorated with finely carved Ashtoken lotus flowers.

The intricate carvings created by skilled craftsmen adorn the interior and the sides of the building. Bas-relief figures of Lord Shiva, Lord Vishnu and Lord Brahma, with their respective consorts appear on panels at the sides of the temple. Unusually, the mandap (pillared hall) is covered with a roof of plain grey sloping slabs. The temple faces east so that the first rays of the rising sun shine on the deity. There is a small mandap and the inner sanctum is surmounted by a three-tired tower whose top is incomplete or has been dismantled sometime in the distant past.

There is a headless Nandi (bull, Shiva's vehicle) in the centre of the mandap, surrounded by four matching columns. The symbol of the Kadamba kingdom, an elephant trampling a horse is carved on the base of one of the columns. The river Ragado, (via village Keri, Sattari) flows nearby and is reachable for ritual bathing by a flight of stone steps.

The festival of Mahashivratri is celebrated with pomp and gaiety at the temple by local people residing in surrounding villages. The temple is built in a place which is quite inaccessible and away from the main settlements of the time. The temple is small compared to the average Goan temple.

== Location ==
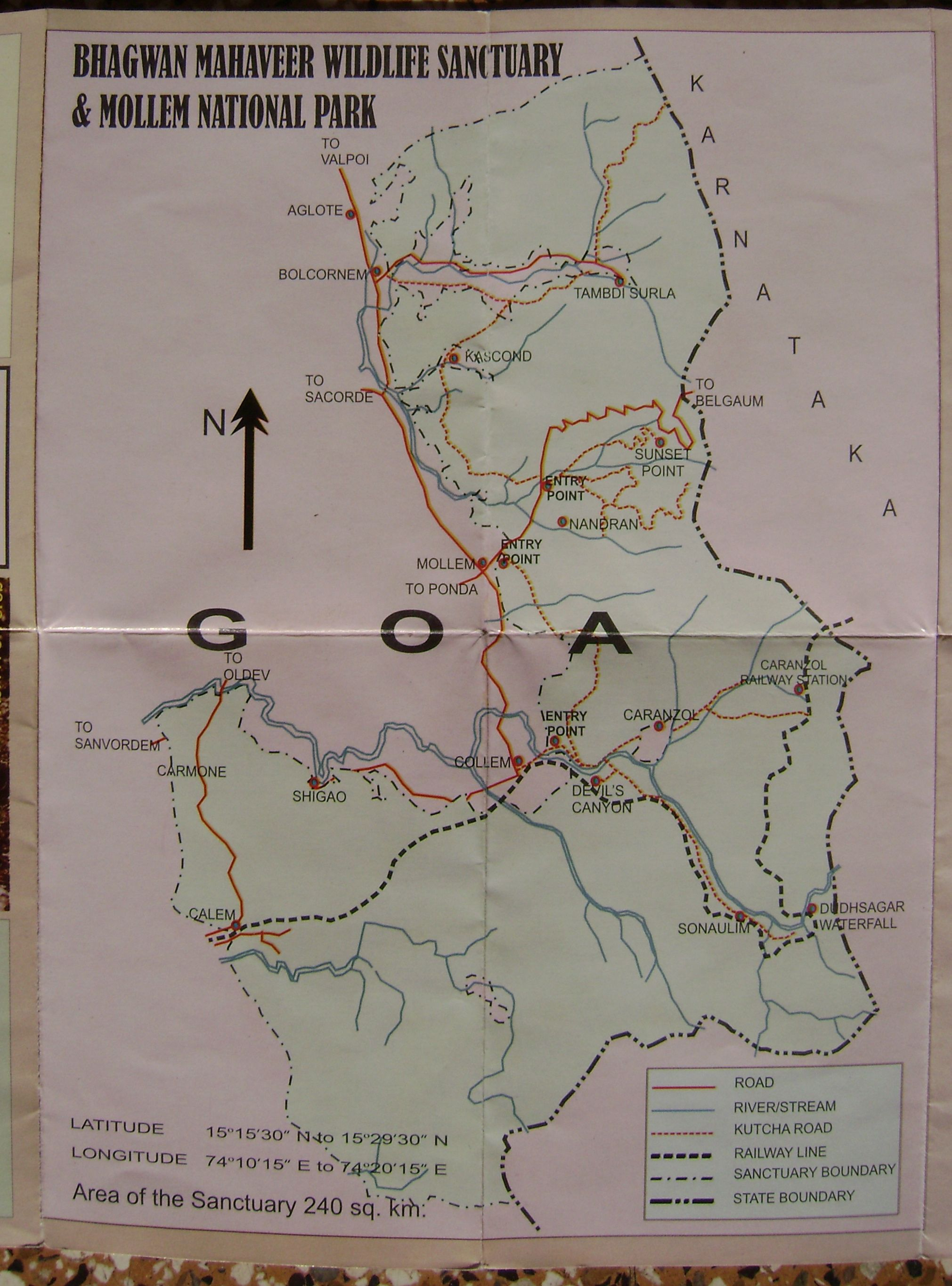
Map of Bhagwan Mahaveer Sanctuary and Mollem National Park, showing Tambdi Surla

The temple is at 15°26′20″N 74°15′8″E near a small village called Tambdi Surla located 13 kilometres (8.1 mi) east of Bolcornem village, in the north east region of the Bhagwan Mahaveer Sanctuary and Mollem National Park. Nearby village is Molem.

Mahadev Temple is approximately 65 kilometres (40 mi) from the capital city of Panaji. It is accessible from the north via minor roads 22 kilometres (14 mi) south from the main town of Valpoi in Sattari Taluka. The temple is at the foot of the Anmod Ghat, which connects Goa to the state of Karnataka.

== Gallery ==
Mahadev Temple, Tambdi Surla, Goa

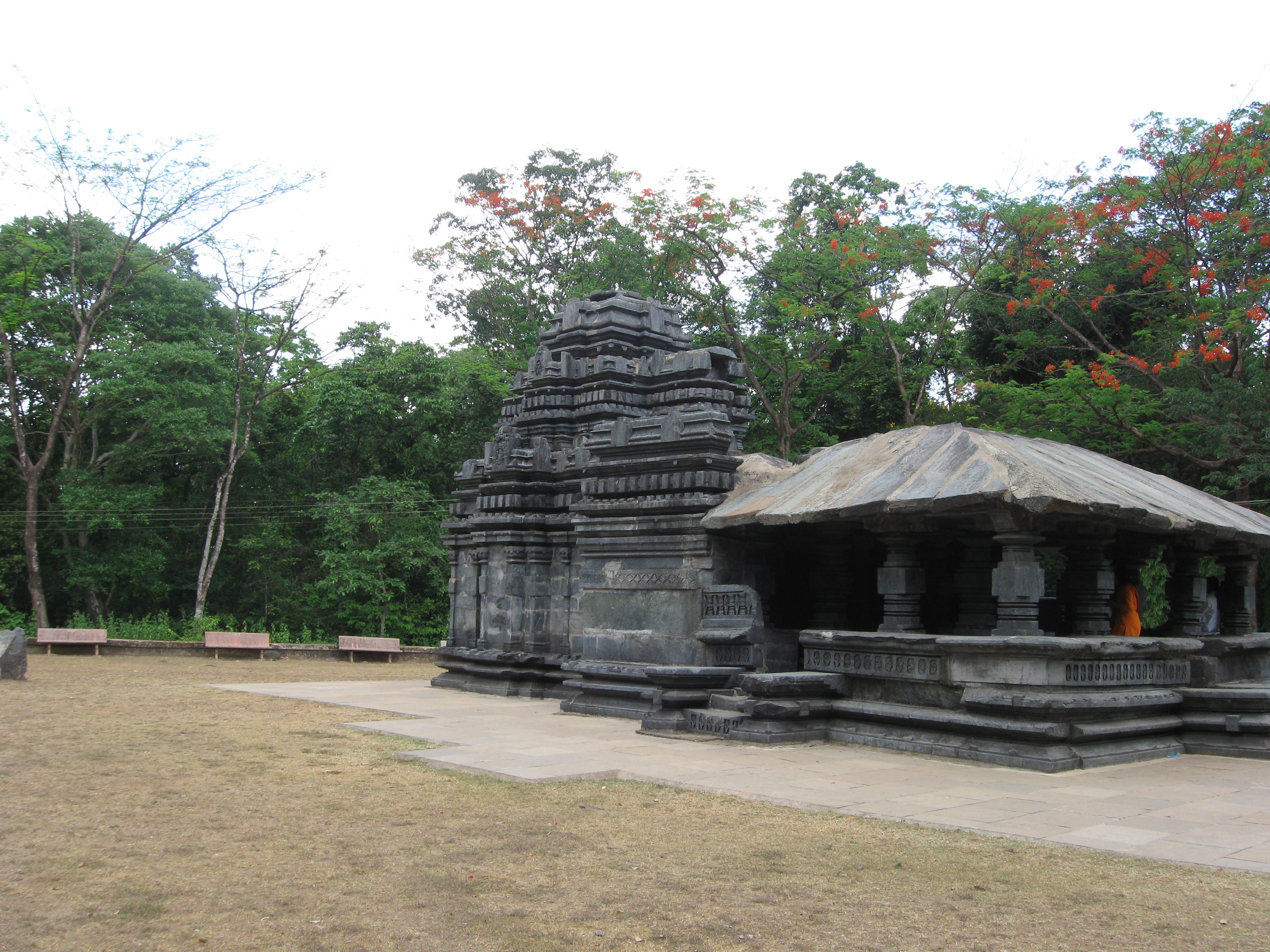
View from Outside

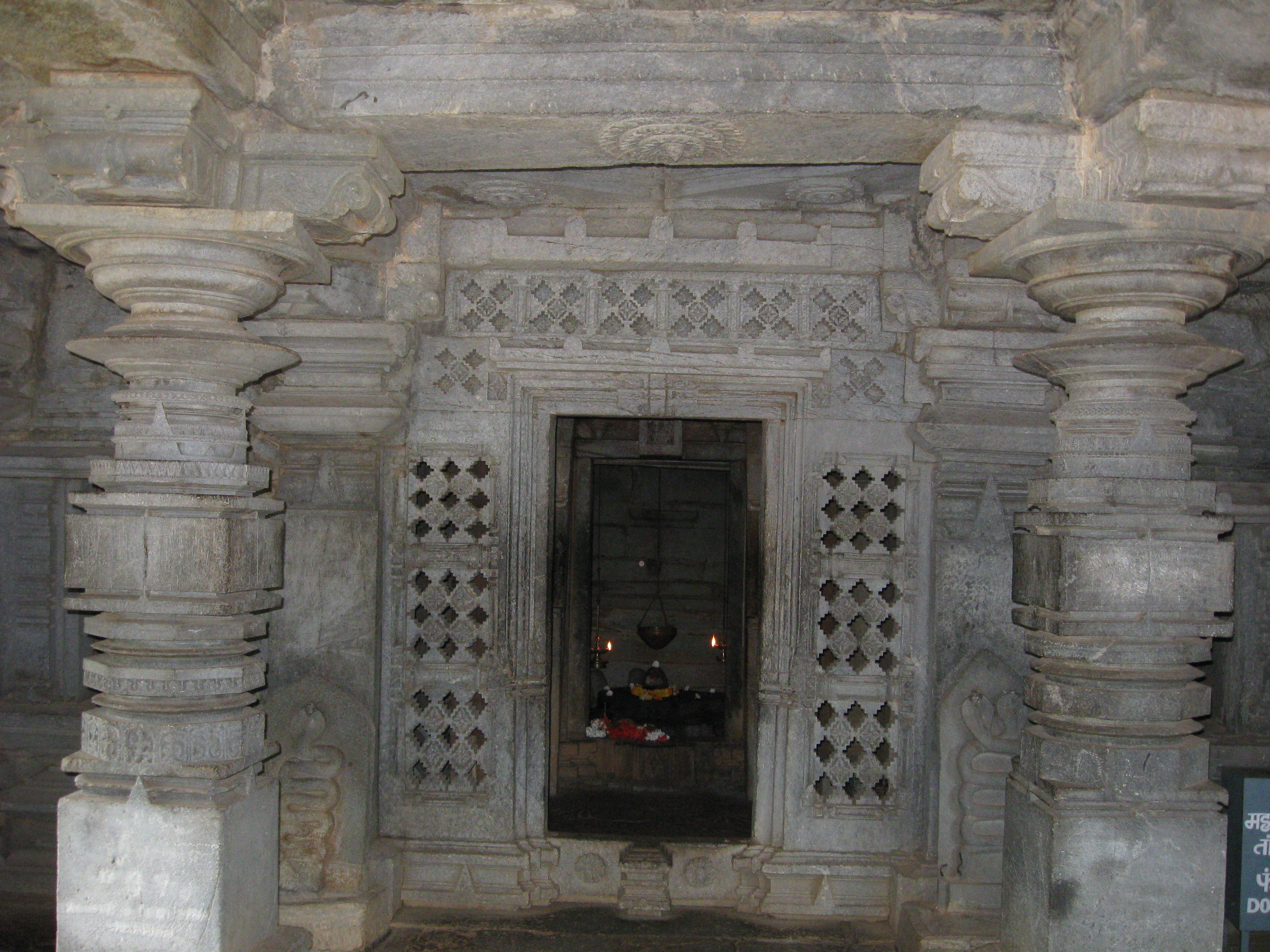
The Lingam

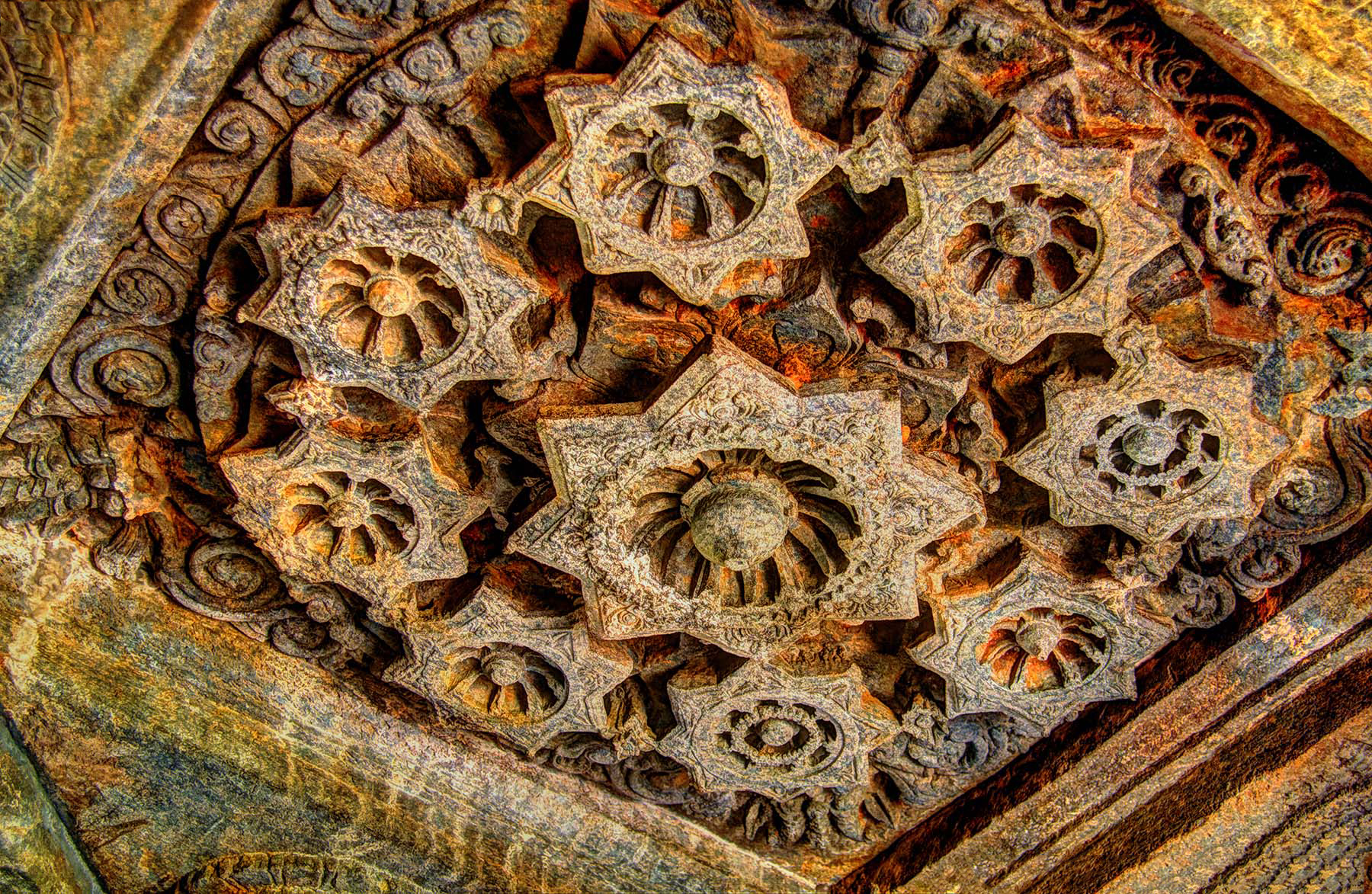
HDR image of carvings on the ceiling of Mahadev Temple.

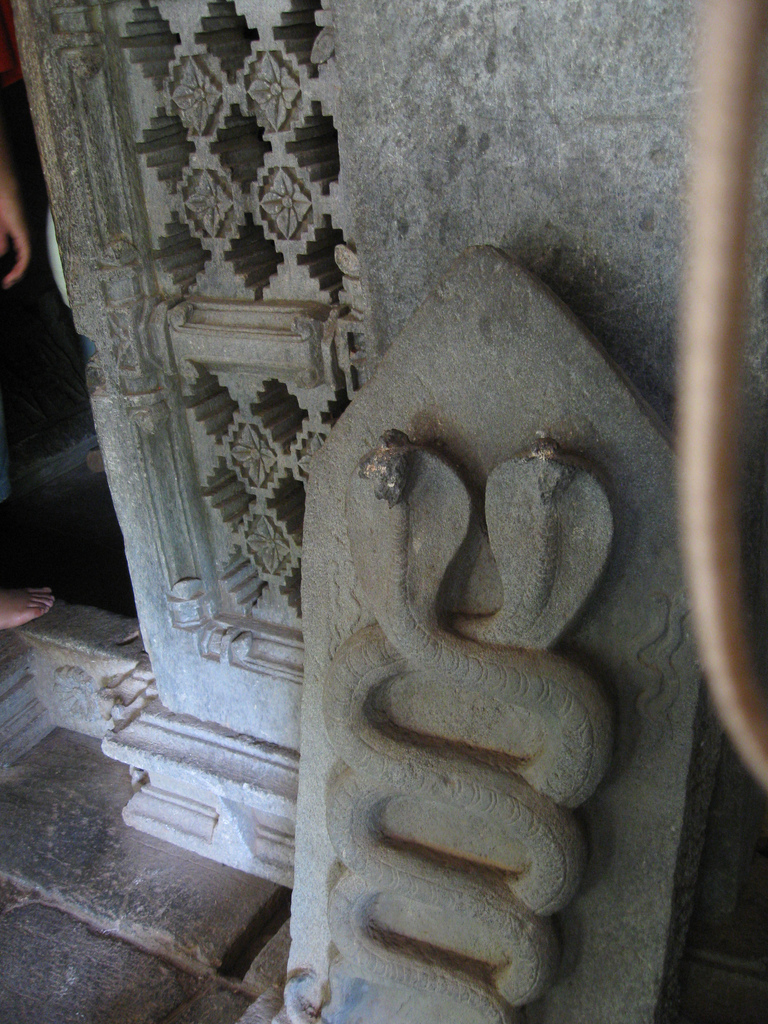
Intricate King Cobra Rock Carvings

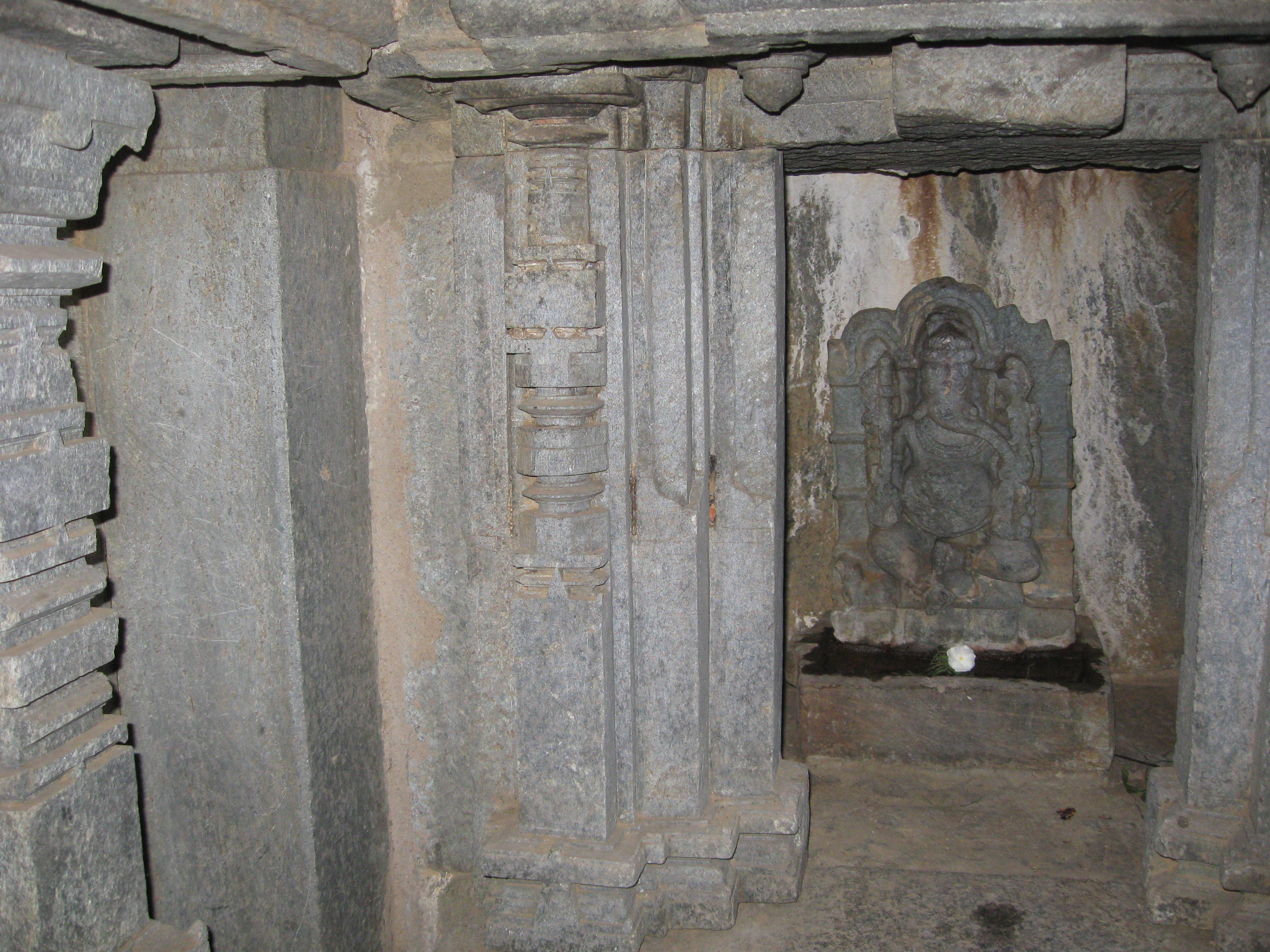
Carvings Inside Mahadev Temple

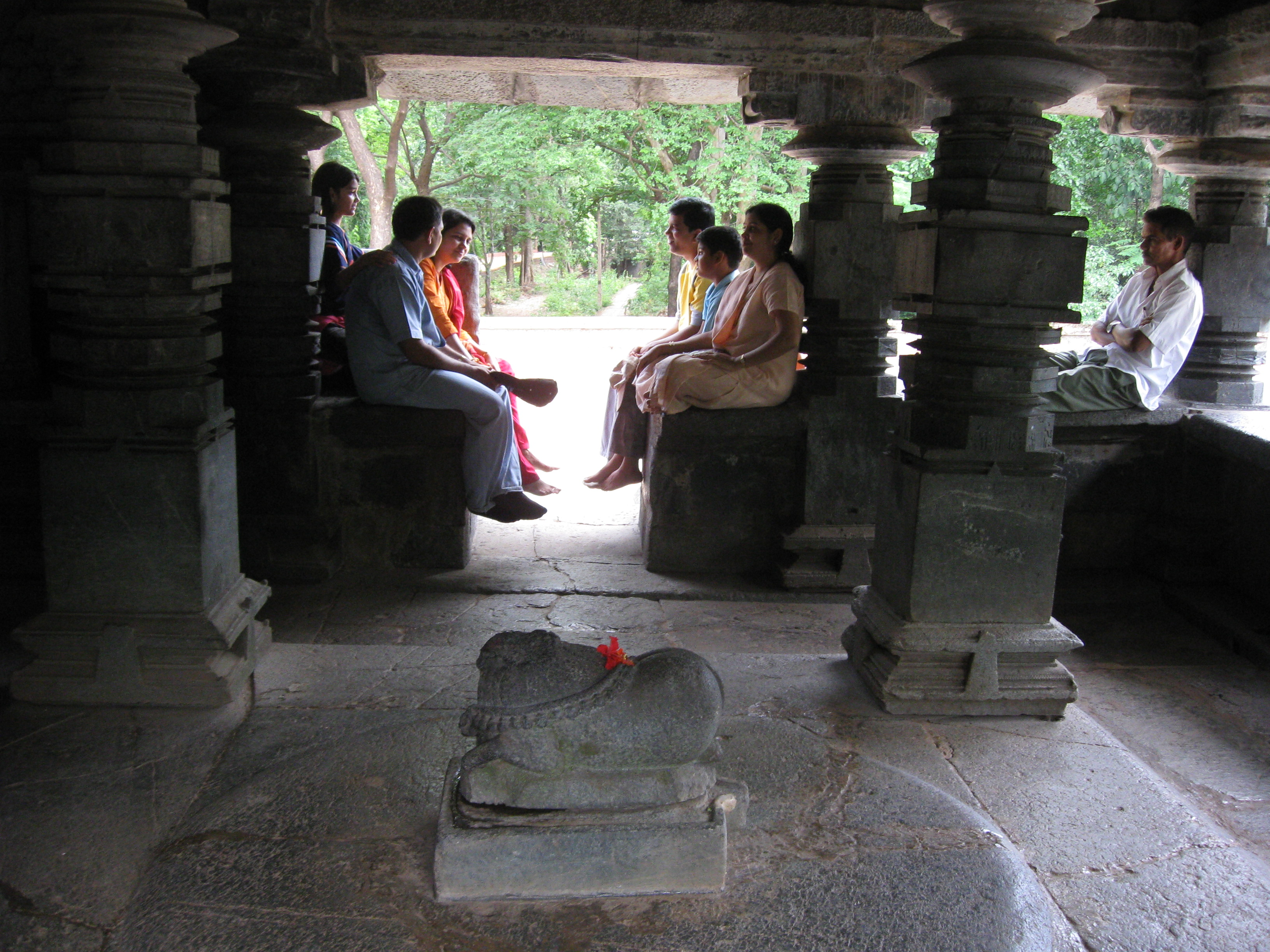
Visitors Relaxing

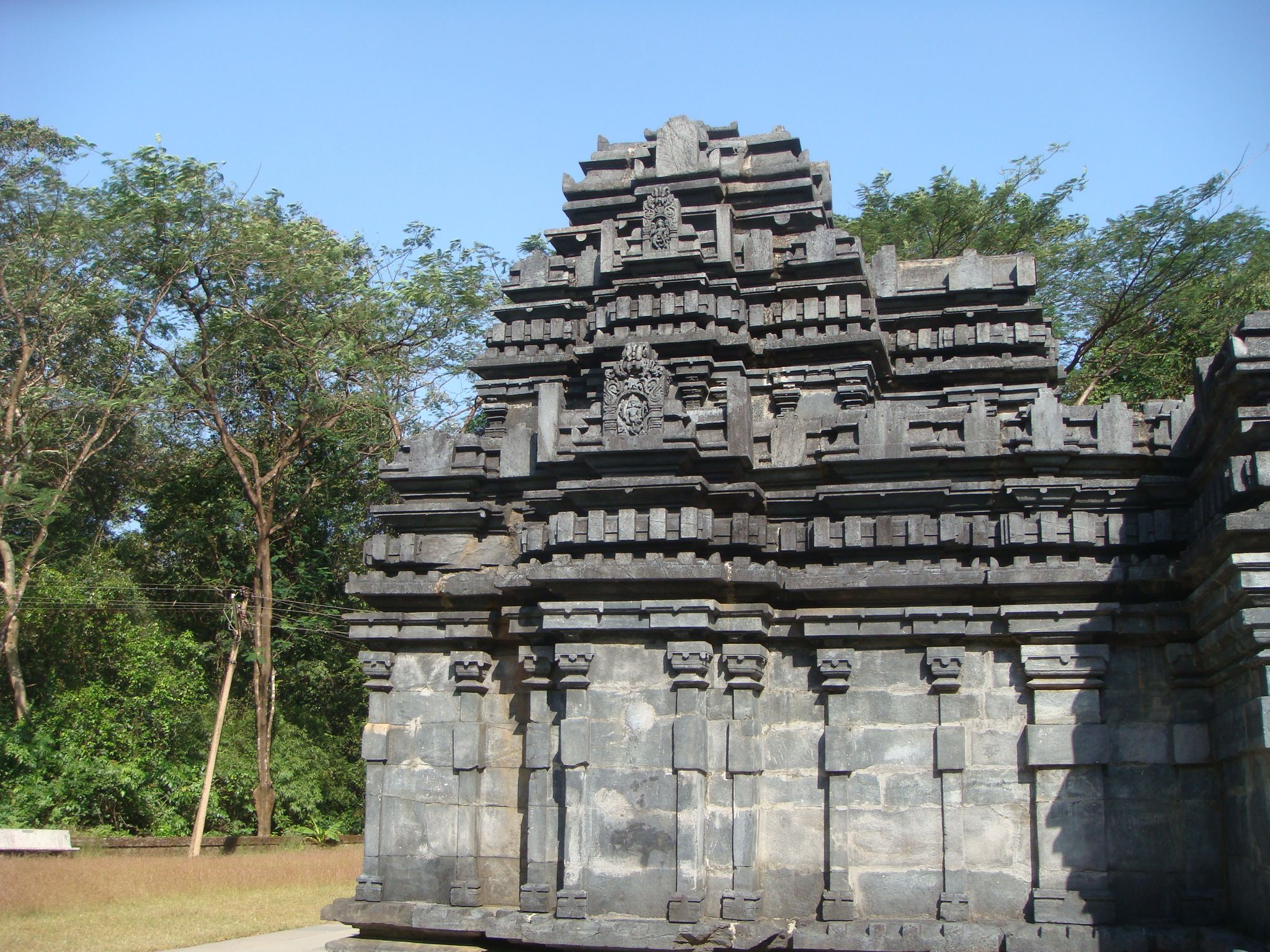
Rear of the temple

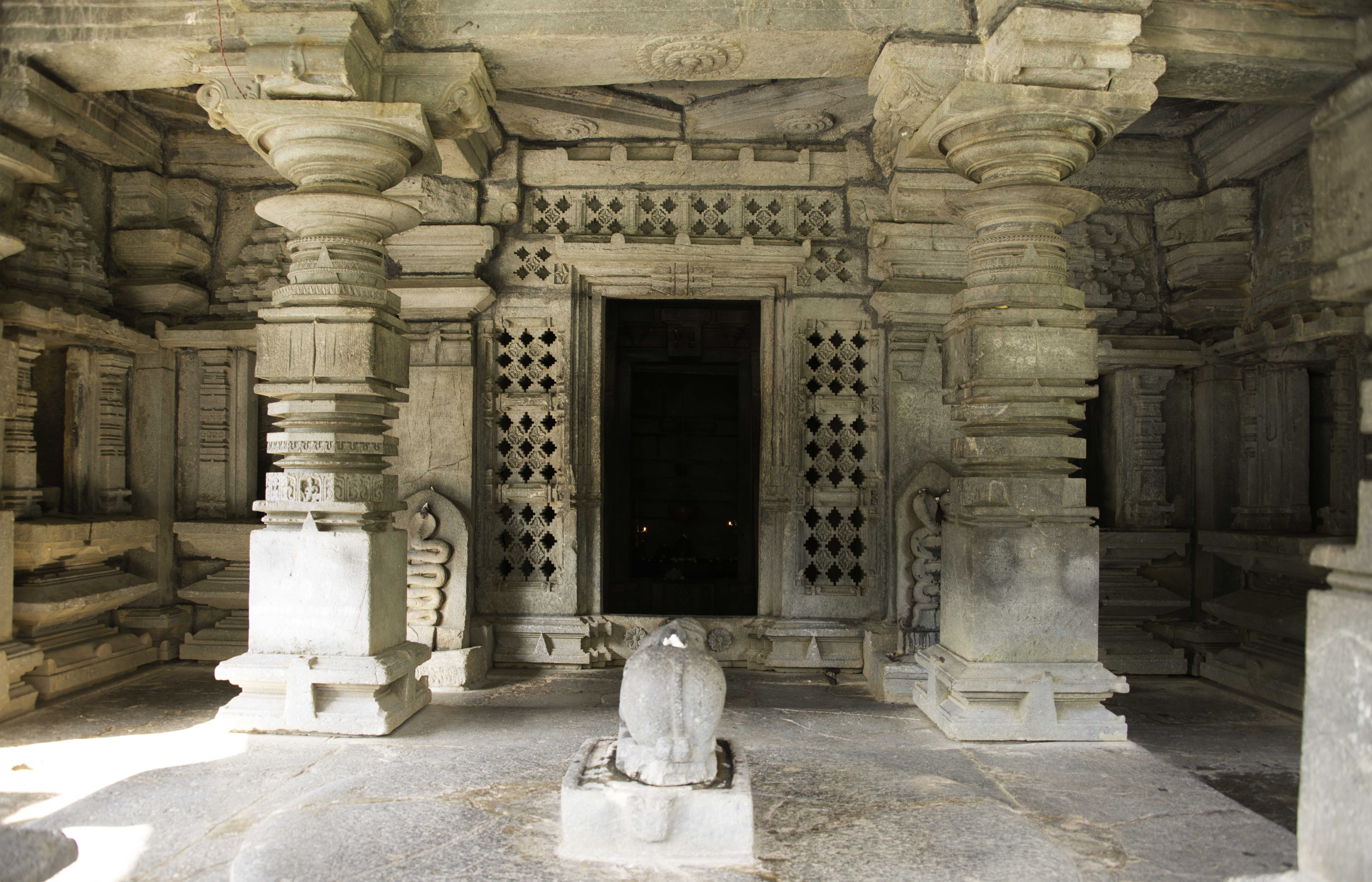
Carved stone pillars forming Mukhamantapa
Bharabhumi Temple, Tambdi Surla, Goa

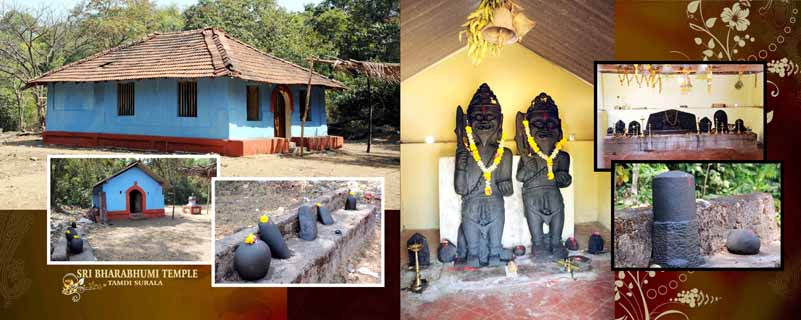
Bharabhumi Temple, Tambdi Surla, Goa
