= Dudh Sagar railway station =

Railway station in South Goa District, India

DUDH SAGAR

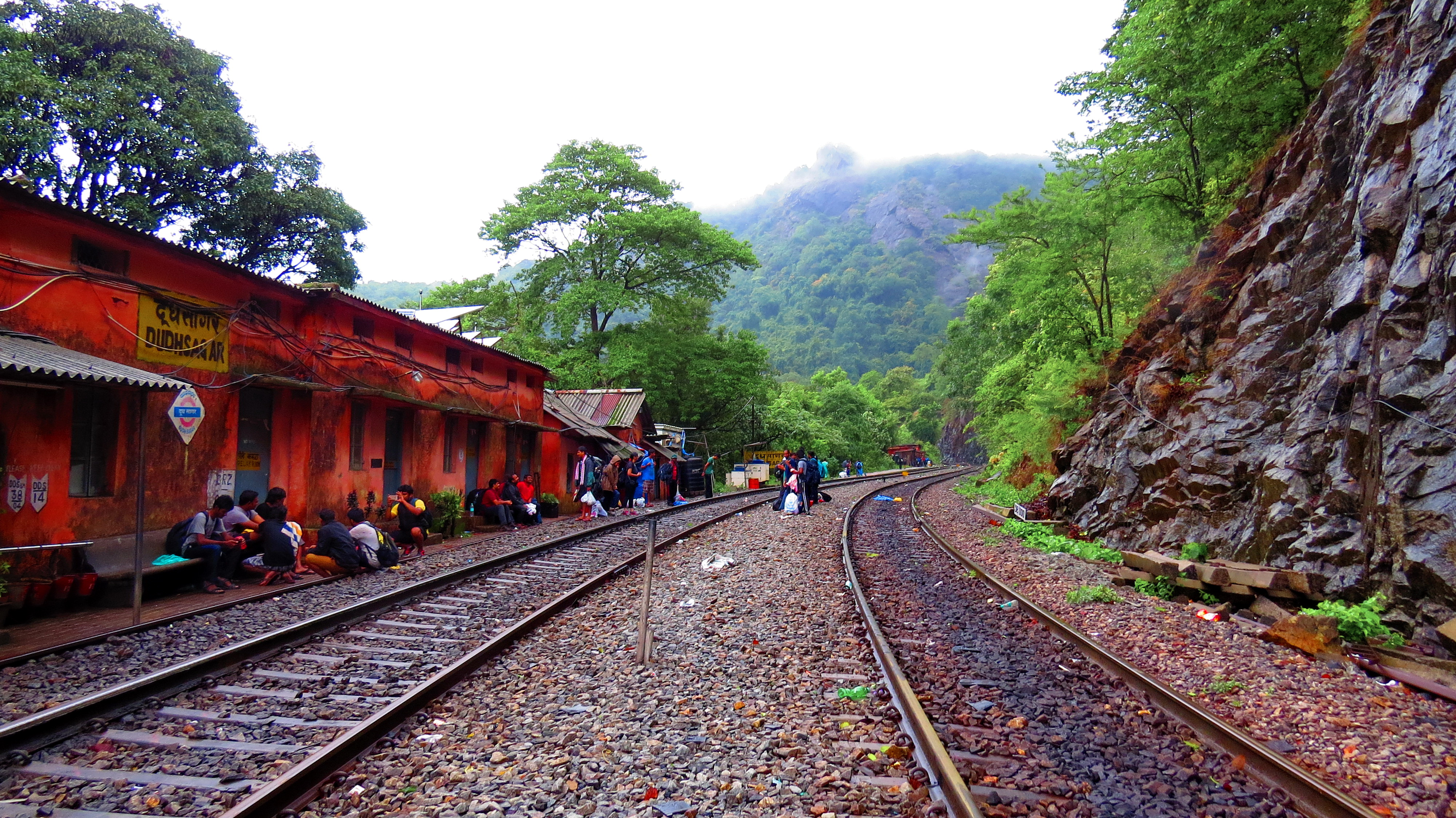

General information
- Location: Doodh Sagar, Goa; India
- Coordinates: 15.3166°N 74.3064°E
- Elevation: 281 metres (922 ft)
- System: Indian Railways station
- Owner: Indian Railways
- Operator: South Western Railway zone
- Line: Guntakal–Vasco da Gama section
- Platforms: 1
- Tracks: 2
- Connections: Auto stand

Construction
- Structure type: Standard (on-ground station)
- Parking: No
- Cycle facilities: No

Other information
- Status: Single diesel line
- Station code: DDS
- Zone(s): South Western Railway zone
- Division(s): Hubli

Services
Preceding station	Indian Railways	Following station
Dudh Sagar Water Falls towards ?	South Western Railway zone Guntakal–Vasco da Gama section	Caranzol towards ?
Location
- Location within India Location within Goa
- Interactive map of Dudh Sagar

Dudh Sagar Railway Station (Station code: DDS) is a small railway station in South Goa district, Goa. It serves Dudh Sagar village. The station consists of one platform. The platform is not well sheltered. It lacks many facilities, including water and sanitation. This station is one of three in the Braganza Ghats.
