= Anmod =

Anmod Anamod
- Village
- Location in India
- Coordinates: 15.438°N 74.308°E
- Country: India
- State: Karnataka
- District: Uttara Kannada
- Taluk: Supa (Joida)
- Elevation: 650 m (2,130 ft)

Population (2011)
  - Total: 798
- Time zone: UTC+05:30 (IST)
- PIN: 581453
- ISO 3166 code: IN-KA

Anmod (officially recorded as Anamod) is a village in the Supa (Joida) taluk of Uttara Kannada district in the Indian state of Karnataka. Situated directly on the border between Goa and Karnataka, it serves as a primary transit point along the Belgaum-Goa route via the Anmod Ghat.

== Demographics ==
According to the 2011 Census of India, Anmod has a total population of 798 people residing in 167 households.

== Geography and transport ==
The village is located at an elevation of roughly 650 metres (2,130 ft) above sea level. It serves as the eastern gateway to the Anmod Ghat, a prominent mountain pass in the Western Ghats that connects the Deccan Plateau in Karnataka to the coastal plains of Goa. The pass is traversed by National Highway 748 (NH 748).

Anmod is surrounded by dense semi-evergreen and evergreen forests, bordering the Bhagwan Mahaveer Sanctuary and Mollem National Park. This protected area is part of a globally recognized biodiversity hotspot.

== Nearby attractions ==
Dudhsagar Falls, one of India's tallest waterfalls at a height of 310 metres (1,020 ft), is located in the vicinity of Anmod within the Bhagwan Mahaveer Sanctuary. The four-tiered waterfall is formed by the Mandovi River cascading down the steep escarpment of the Western Ghats.

While Anmod and the nearby Castle Rock station were historically used as starting points for trekking to the falls, the Goa Forest Department and Indian Railways have officially prohibited trekking along the active railway tracks leading to the site due to severe safety hazards. Authorized access to the base of Dudhsagar Falls is strictly regulated by the Forest Department and is primarily facilitated via jeep safaris originating from the village of Kulem at the western base of the Anmod Ghat.

== Geology ==
Some of the oldest rocks in the Indian subcontinent are found in the region between Anmod and nearby Mollem on the Goa-Karnataka border. These rocks are classified as Trondhjemitic Gneiss and are estimated to be 3,600 million years old, dated by the rubidium isotope dating method.

== See also ==
- Kankumbi
- Londa
- Dandeli
