= Sonalium railway station =

Railway station in Goa, India

Sonalium Railway Station

General information
- Location: Sonalium, Goa; India
- Coordinates: 15.3094°N 74.2986°E
- Elevation: 170 metres (560 ft)
- System: Indian Railways station
- Owner: Indian Railways
- Operator: South Western Railway zone
- Line: Guntakal–Vasco da Gama section
- Platforms: 1
- Tracks: 2
- Connections: Auto stand

Construction
- Structure type: Standard (on-ground station)
- Parking: No
- Cycle facilities: No

Other information
- Status: Active
- Station code: LIM
- Zone(s): South Western Railway zone
- Division(s): Hubli

Services
Preceding station	Indian Railways	Following station
Kulem towards ?	South Western Railway zone Guntakal–Vasco da Gama section	Dudh Sagar Water Falls towards ?
Location

Sonalium Railway Station is a small railway station in Kushavati district, Goa. Its code is LIM. It serves Sonalium village. The station consists of a single platform. The platform is not well sheltered. It lacks many facilities including water and sanitation. This station is one of three in Braganza Ghats.
