= Mollem, Goa =

Molem
- town
- Location in Goa, India Molem (India)
- Coordinates: 15.379047°N 74.226294°E
- Country: India
- State: Goa
- District: Kushavati district
- Elevation: 16 m (52 ft)

Languages
  - Official: Konkani
- Time zone: UTC+5:30 (IST)
- Vehicle registration: GA 12
- Website: goa.gov.in

Mollem (pronounced mole; the alphabet m is silent) is a small village in Goa,on NH4 near the border with Karnataka in the foothills of the Sahyadri Mountain range at the beginning of Anmod Ghat. It comes under the Dharbandora block. The village is the primary entry point for Bhagwan Mahaveer Sanctuary and Mollem National Park.

== Geology ==
Some of the world's oldest rocks are found in this region and are classified as Trondjemeitic Gneiss with Rubidium isotope dating estimating them to be at least 3,600 million years old.
