= Caranzol railway station =

Railway station in Goa, India

Caranzol Railway Station(also known as 'Caranjhol Railway station')
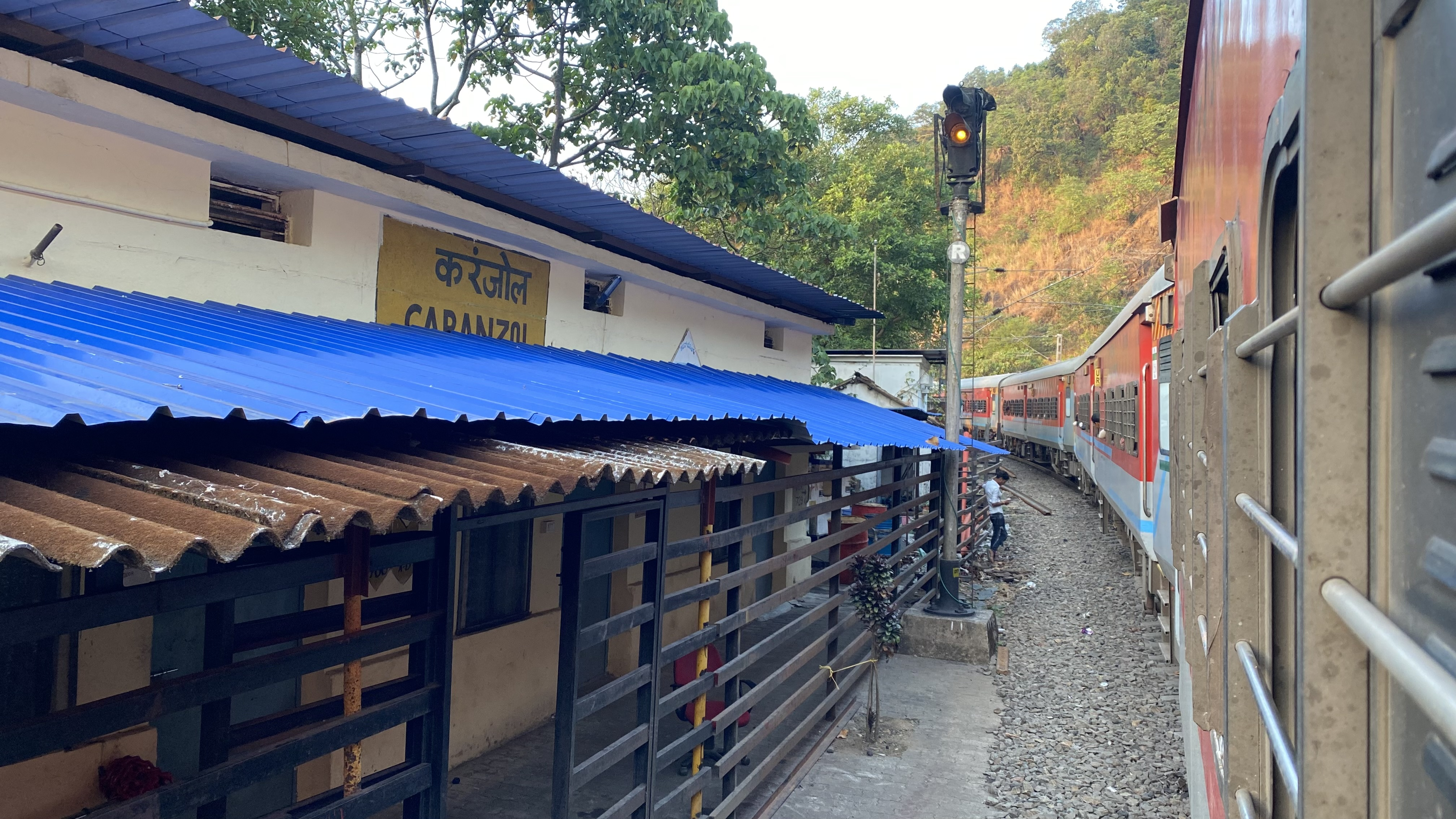

General information
- Location: Caranzol, Goa; India
- Coordinates: 15.3601°N 74.3061°E
- Elevation: 170 metres (560 ft)
- System: Indian Railways station
- Owner: Indian Railways
- Operator: South Western Railway zone
- Line: Guntakal–Vasco da Gama section
- Platforms: 1
- Tracks: 2
- Connections: Auto stand

Construction
- Structure type: Standard (on-ground station)
- Parking: No
- Cycle facilities: No

Other information
- Status: Single diesel line
- Station code: CRZ
- Zone(s): South Western Railway zone
- Division(s): Hubli

Services
Preceding station	Indian Railways	Following station
Dudh Sagar towards ?	South Western Railway zone Guntakal–Vasco da Gama section	Castle Rock towards ?
Location

Caranzol Railway Station (station code: CRZ)(Also known as Caranjhol Railway station)is a small railway station in Kushavati district, Goa. It serves Caranzol village. The station consists of 1 platform. The platform is not well sheltered. It lacks many facilities including water and sanitation. This station is one of three in the Braganza Ghats. This is the last station in Goa before the line passes into Karnataka.
