= Bhagwan Mahaveer Sanctuary and Mollem National Park =

National park in Goa, India

- IUCN category II (national park)
- Location within Goa Location within India

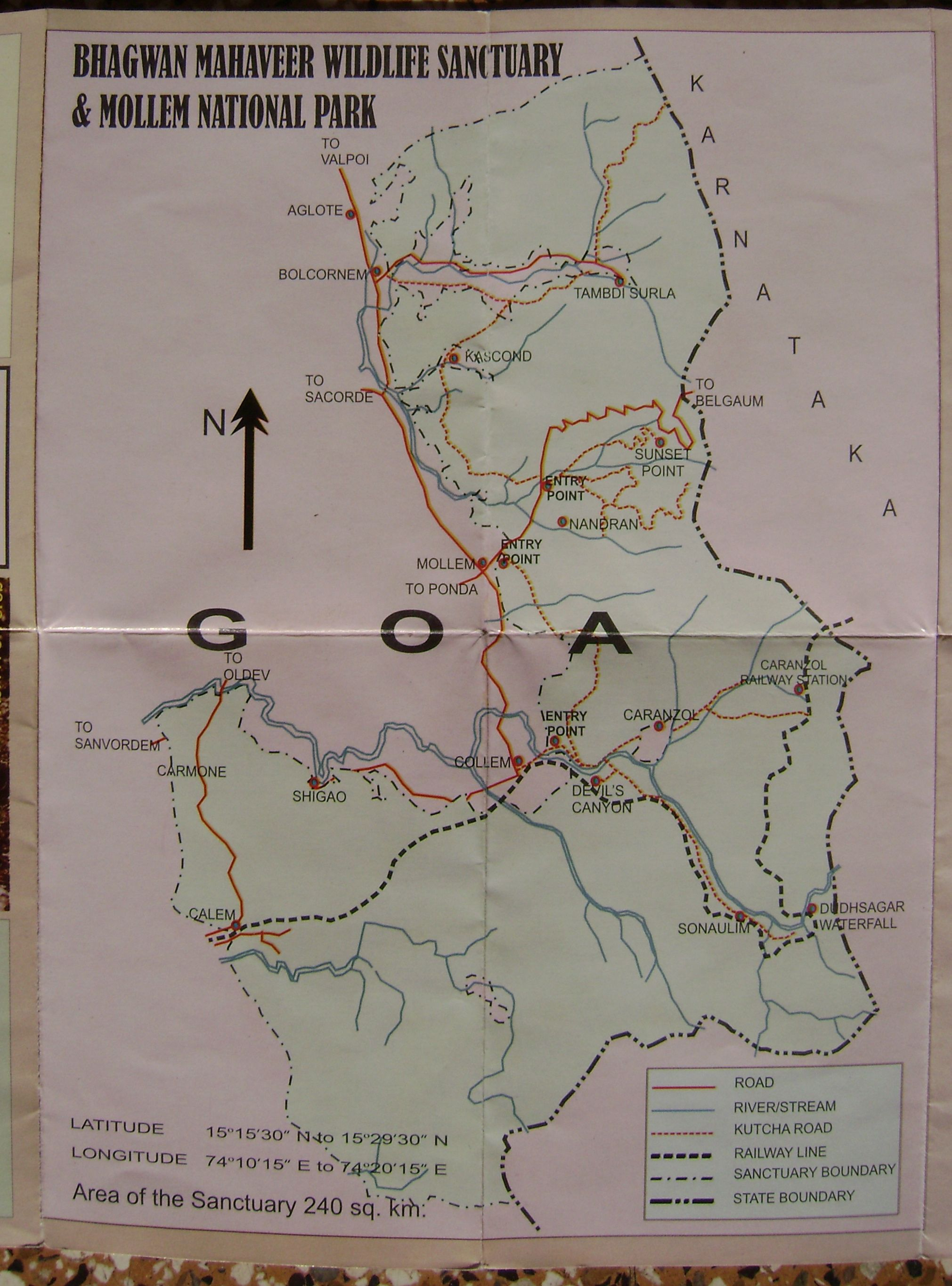
- Interactive map of Bhagwan Mahaveer Sanctuary and Mollem National Park
- Location: Goa, India
- Coordinates: 15°22′25″N 74°15′31″E
- Area: 107 km^{2} (41 sq mi)
- Established: 1978
- Governing body: Goa forest department

Bhagwan Mahaveer Sanctuary and Mollem National Park is a 240 square kilometres (93 sq mi) protected area located in the Western Ghats of West India, in Dharbandora taluk, Goa State, along the eastern border with Karnataka. The area is situated near the town of Molem, 57 kilometres (35 mi) east of Panaji, the state capital of Goa. National Highway 4A divides it into two parts and the Mormugao - Londa railway line passes through the area. It is located between 15°15"30' to 15°29"30' N and 74°10"15' to 74°20"15' E. It contains several important temples dating to the Kadambas of Goa, and home to waterfalls, such as Dudhsagar Falls and Tambdi Falls. The parkland is also home to a community of nomadic buffalo herders known as the Dhangar.

== History ==
This area was first known as Mollem Game Sanctuary. It was declared a wildlife sanctuary in 1969 and renamed as Bhagwan Mahaveer Sanctuary. The core area of the sanctuary covering 107 square kilometres (41 sq mi) was notified as Mollem National Park in 1978.

== Flora and fauna ==
This sanctuary contains pristine vegetation classified as West Coast tropical evergreen forests, West Coast semi-evergreen forests and moist deciduous forests. The evergreen forests are mainly seen at higher altitudes and along the river banks. The predominant species are Terminalia, Lagerstroemia, Xylia and Dalbergia. The forest canopy is almost closed and the availability of grass is very limited. There are several perennial water sources in the sanctuary and the availability of water is not a limiting factor for wildlife.

=== Plant diversity ===
Bhagwan Mahaveer National Park and the surrounding area harbors 722 species of flowering plants in the wild, belonging to 492 genera and 122 families. 128 species of endemic plants either endemic to the Western Ghats, Peninsular India or India occur in the park. Two recently described taxa, Amorphophallus commutatus var. anmodensis and Glyphochloa veldkampii, are confined to the park. Additionally 37 species of Pteridophytes are also found in the park.

=== Mammals ===
Wild mammals recorded in the sanctuary include the leopard (particularly the black variant), barking deer, Bengal tiger, bonnet macaque, common langur, civet, flying squirrel, gaur, Malabar giant squirrel, mouse deer, pangolin, porcupine, slender loris, sambar, spotted deer, wild boar and wild dog.

In May 2019, two tigers from Karnataka were photographed by camera traps in the park, and a tigress and her cubs were photographed in Mhadei Wildlife Sanctuary, the first sightings in Goa since 2013.

=== Birds ===
Popular birds which can be seen in the sanctuary include: drongo, emerald dove, fairy bluebird, golden oriole, greater Indian hornbill, Indian black woodpecker, Malabar grey hornbill, Malabar pied hornbill, grey-headed myna, grey jungle fowl, large green barbet, paradise flycatcher, racket-tailed drongo, ruby-throated yellow bulbul (the Goa state bird), shrikes, three-toed kingfisher, Sri Lanka frogmouth, wagtails. This sanctuary contains quite a few birds which are endemic to the Indian subcontinent, specifically southern India.

=== Butterflies ===
Some of the many interesting butterfly specimens in the area are: blue Mormon, common Jezebel, common Mormon, common mime, plum Judy, common wanderer, crimson rose, lime butterfly, plain tiger, southern birdwing and tailed jay and one of the most common is the Pygmy scrub-hopper. It also has endemic species like Malabar tree nymph and Tamil yoeman.

=== Reptiles ===
This sanctuary is famous for its snakes, particularly the king cobra. It is also home to bronzeback tree snake, cat snake, hump-nosed pit viper, Indian rock python, Malabar pit viper, rat snake, Russell's viper, Indian cobra and common krait,

== Attractions ==
This sanctuary and national park contain several geological, cultural and visitor service attractions that make this largest protected area in Goa a popular visitor destination.

=== Tambdi Surla Temple ===
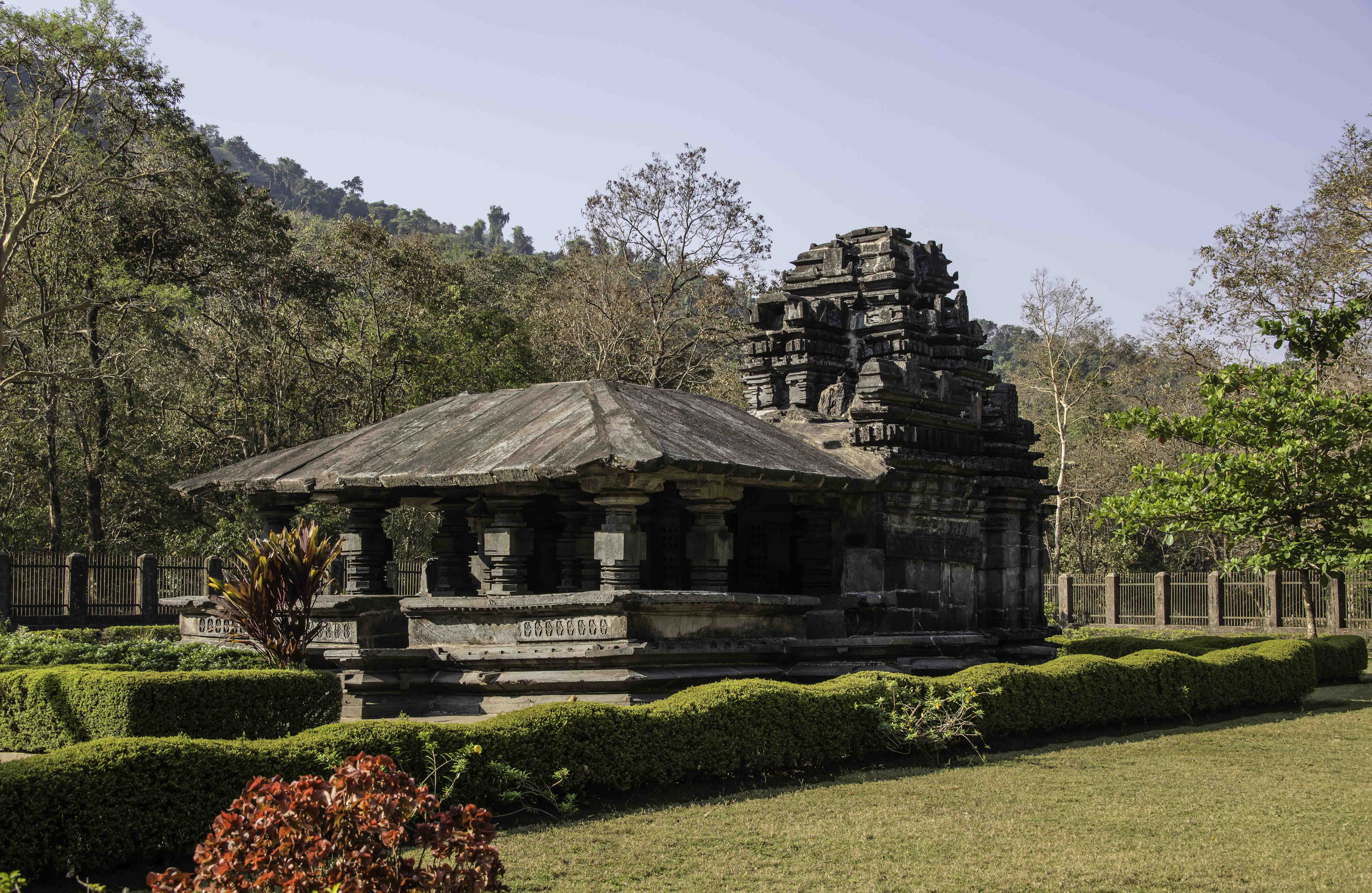
The Mahadev Temple, attributed to the Kadambas of Goa

This small but exquisite 12th-century Shiva temple of the Lord Mahadeva is an active place or worship, located 13 km (8.1 miles) east of Bolcornem village, past the end of a single lane paved road in the northern region of the park. The temple consists of garbhagriha, antarala and a pillared Nandi mandapa built of basalt. The four pillars, embellished with intricate carvings of elephants and chains support a stone ceiling decorated with finely carved lotus flowers of the Ashtoken variety.

=== Dudhsagar Falls ===
Dudhsagar Falls (literally Sea of Milk) is a tiered waterfall located high up on the Mandovi River at the Karnataka border in the southwest part of the park, 10 km (6.2 miles) upstream from Collem Village. At 310 m (1,020 ft), it is Goa's tallest waterfall, India's fifth tallest, and is 227th in the world A viaduct of the South Western Railways passes spectacularly through the waterfalls. This popular destination may be reached by hiking along the 10 km one lane dirt road or hiring a 4-wheel drive vehicle at Collem. Access is dangerous and restricted during the monsoon season of June to September.

Dudhsagar Falls

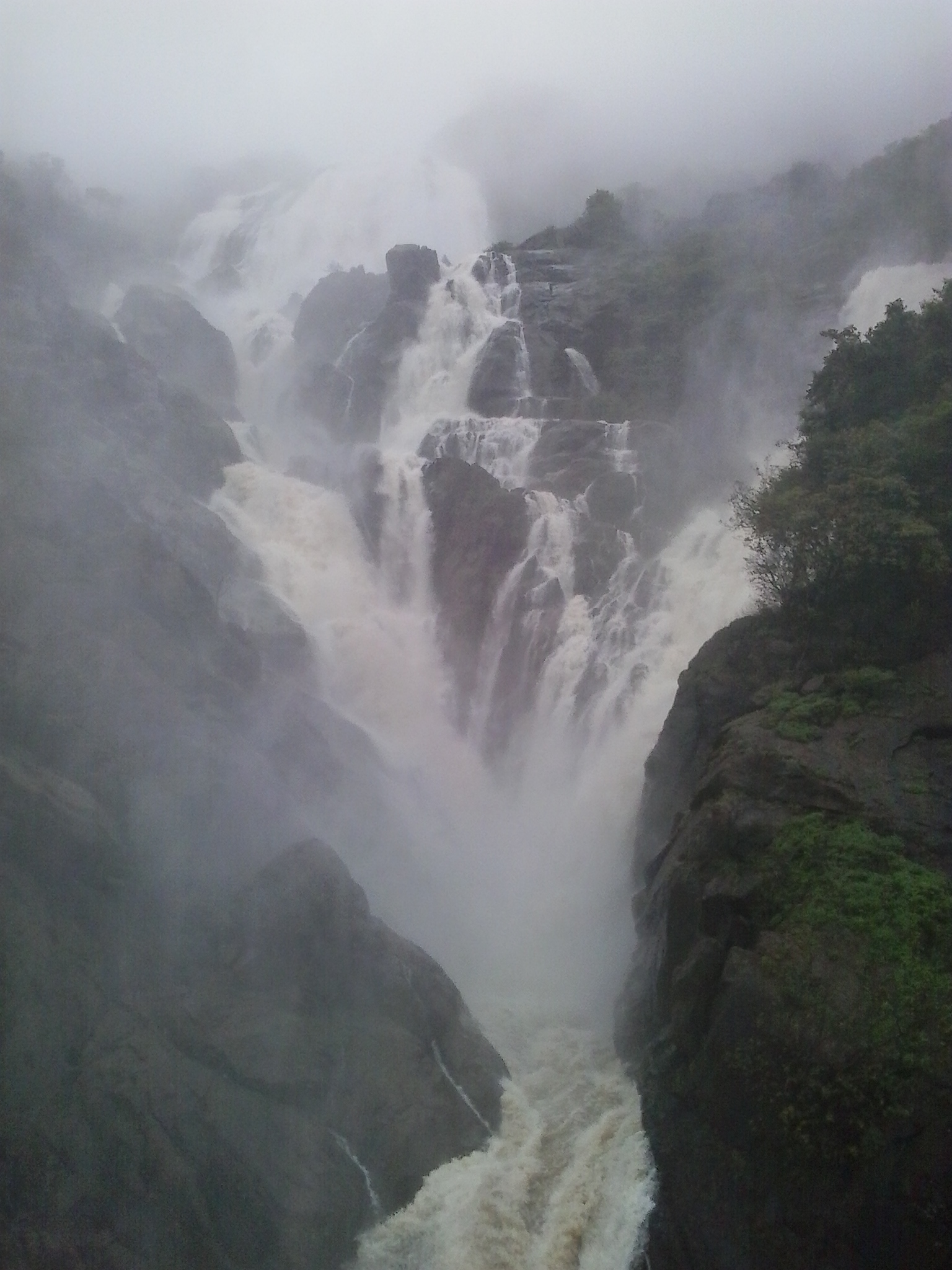
Dudhsagar Waterfalls in August

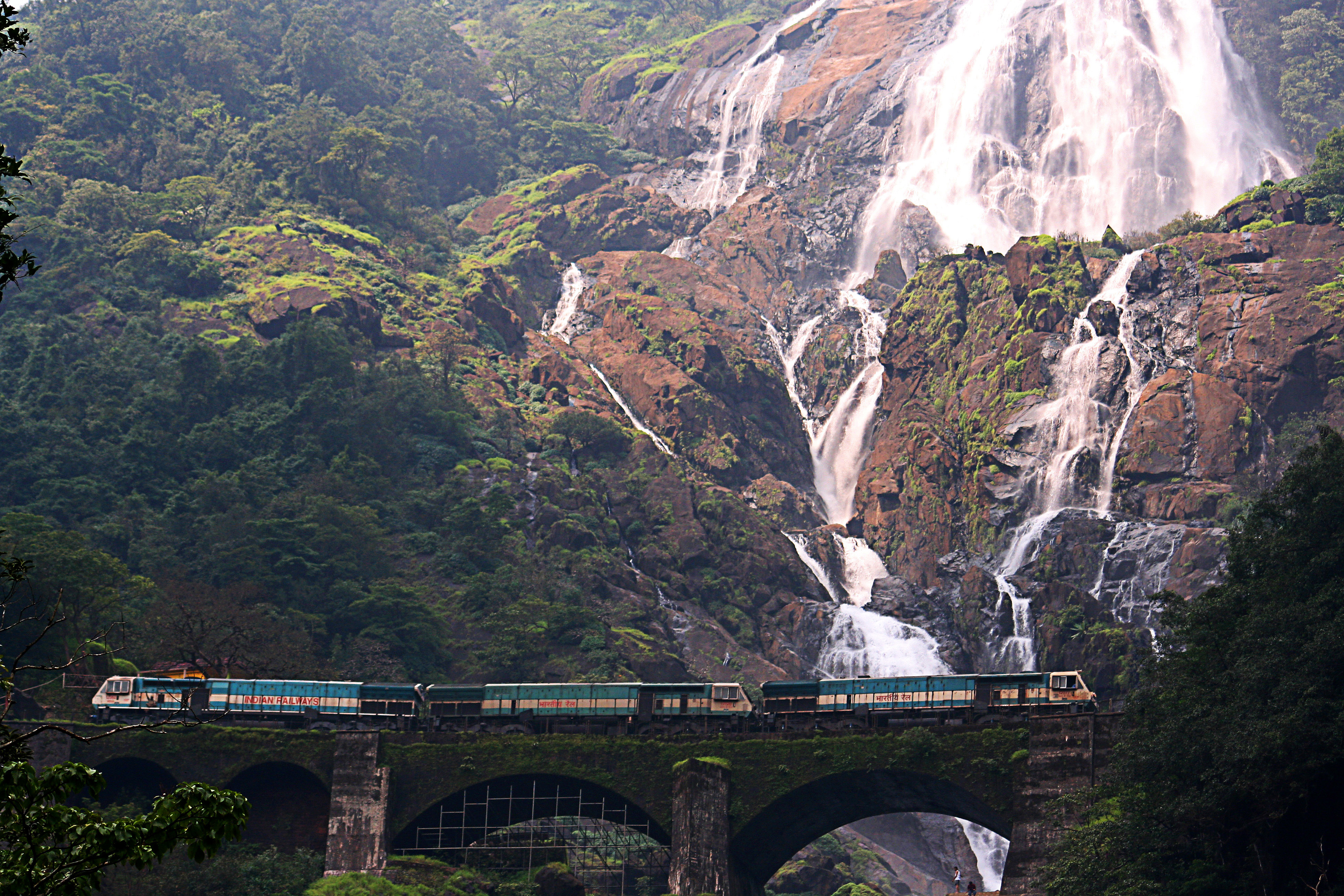
Train passing next to the Dudhsagar Falls

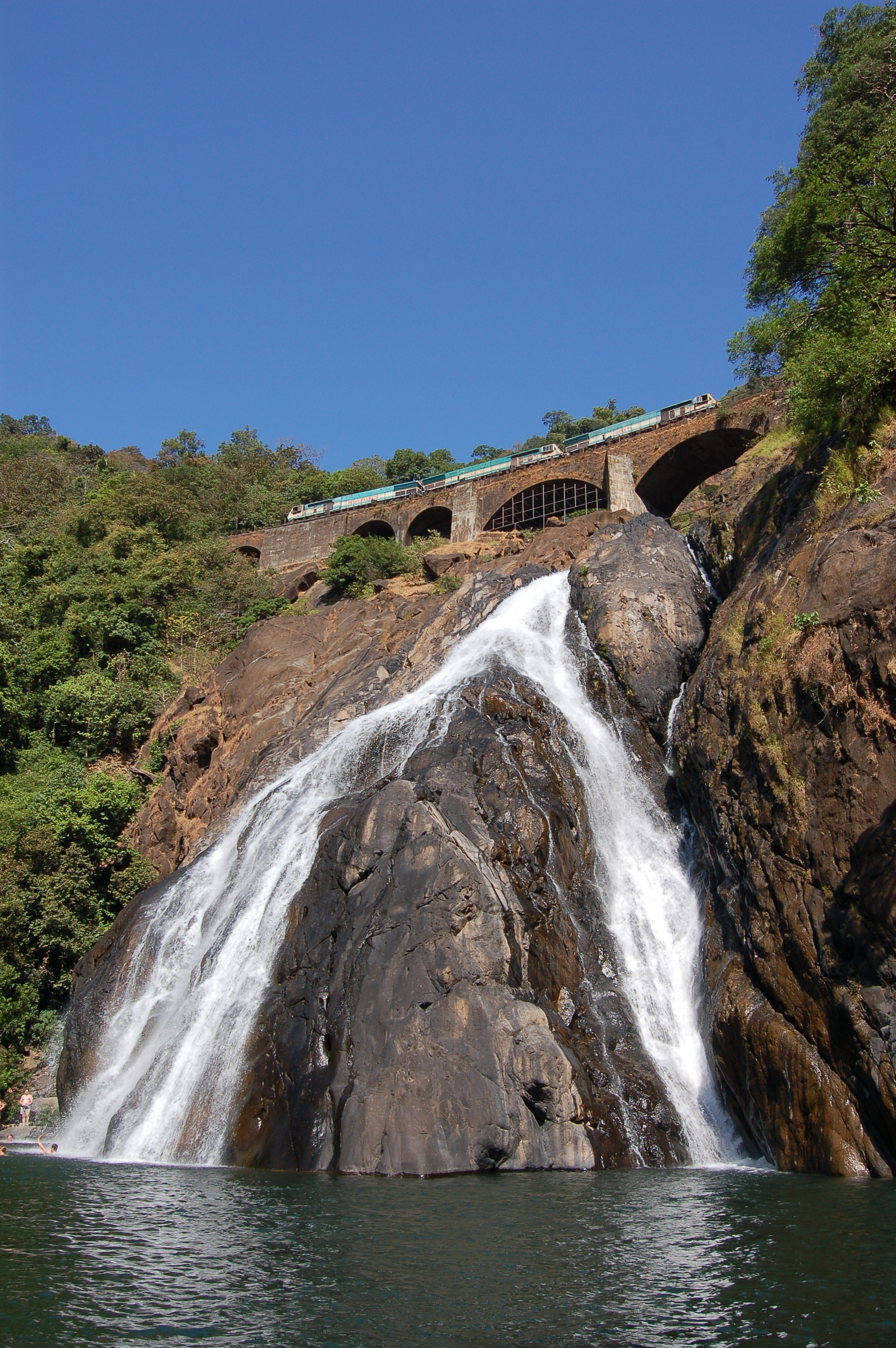
Lower half of Dudhsagar Falls

=== Devils Canyon ===
This is an eerie canyon of water carved crevises downstream from Dudh Sagar Falls, created from solid rock by serpentine underwater currents. It is just off the main trail soon past the Collem entry point.

=== Tambdi Falls ===
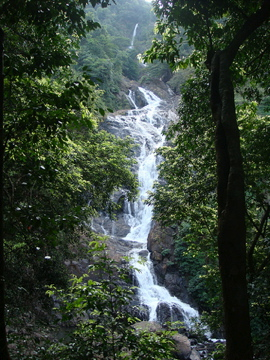
Tambdi Waterfall

This waterfall, located about 2 km southwest of Tambdi Surla, at the Karnataka border, is equally spectacular and only slightly less tall than Dudsagar Falls, however it is rarely visited because of its difficult access by a steep, winding and irregular rocky path. A local guide is required.

=== Sunset Point ===
This point provides a scenic view of the park, revealing an expanse of closed canopy treetops. It can be reached by park vehicles, hired at Mollem check-point, driving along a zig-zagging road carved from the mountain.

== Threats ==
This protected area is threatened by extensive surface mining and transport of manganese and iron ores. A serious threat is the deposit of toxic wastes. In 2006, nearly 13 truckloads of sponge iron by-products had been dumped in the Mollem Wildlife Sanctuary and at Anmod Ghat, The settlement of private rights and concessions has still not been done away with. Some private lands are still within the sanctuary and need to be acquired in due course of time.

=== Three Infrastructural Projects: 2020 ===
In December 2019, a newly constituted State Wildlife Advisory Board (SWLAB) discussed many projects, including the doubling of the railway line, a transmission line and a highway expansion proposal that would affect the Bhagwan Mahavir Wildlife Sanctuary.

Soon after, protests began across Goa, led by millennials using the hashtag #SaveMollem.

Ultimately, in April 2021, the Supreme Court-appointed Central Empowered Committee (CEC) recommended against the three projects. While the double tracking project was cancelled, the transmission line was recommended to be shifted to an existing 110 KV line, and the highway expansion project was recommended to get an environmental clearance (EC) first.
