= Braganza Ghats =

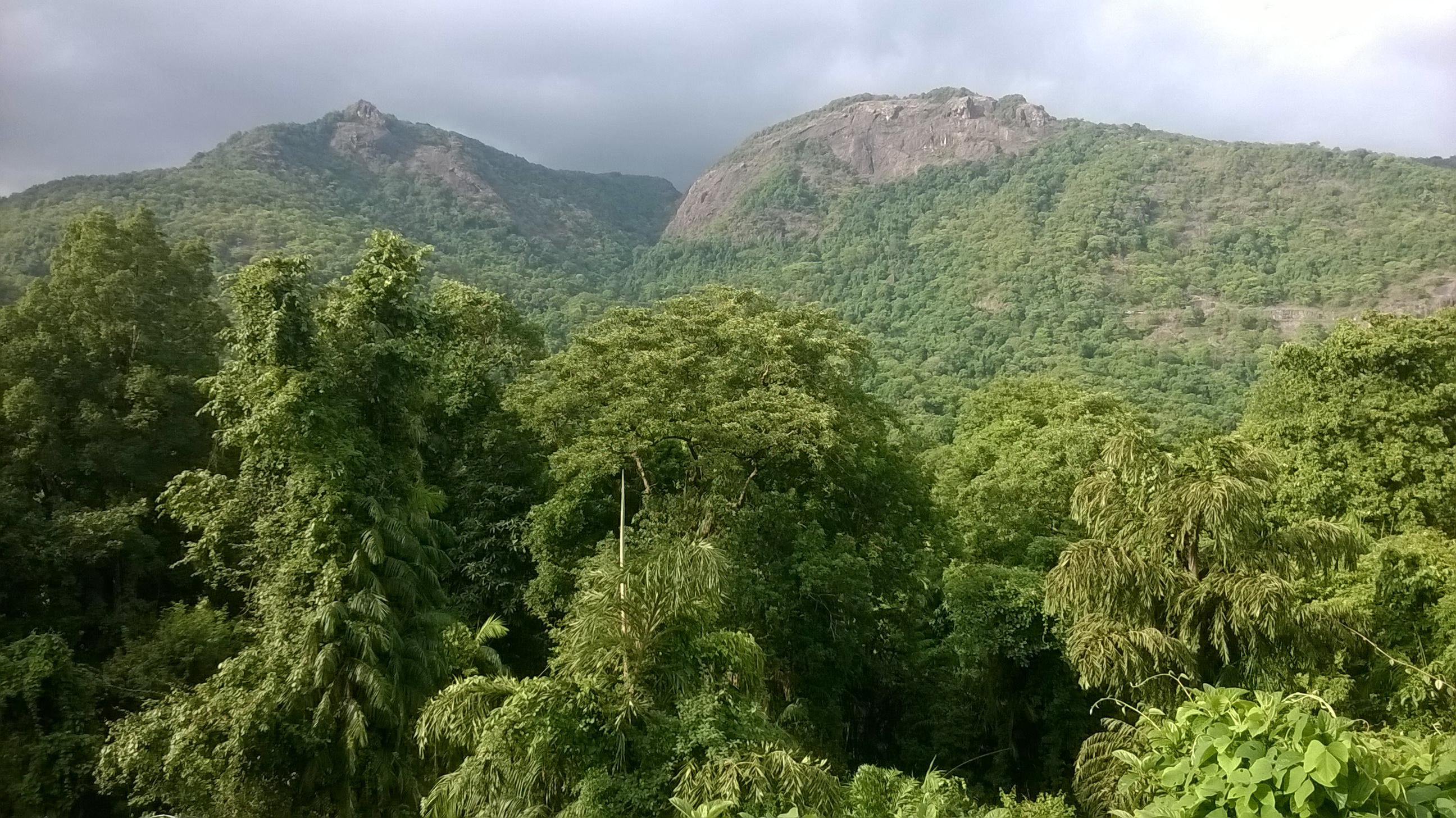
- Forests nearby Dudhsagar Falls in Braganza Ghats Area

- Location within Karnataka Location within Goa

Third Approach
- Location: Karnataka - Goa border, India
- Range: Western Ghats (Sahyadri)
- Coordinates: 15.378881°N 74.305291°E

Braganza Ghats are a stretch of hill section in the Western Ghats alias Sahyadri Range at the Karnataka – Goa border. This 26 km ghat section rail road connects coastal Goa to the hinterlands of Karnataka and other parts. It has three stations en route in the ghats – Caranzol, Doodhsagar and Sonaulim.

== Location ==
The Braganza Ghat section is located on the Karnataka-Goa border in the Western Ghats. It starts from Castle rock in Karnataka and ends up at Kulem in Goa. Prior to the Konkan Railways this was the only way one could have reached Goa via rail.

== Stations ==
The 26 km section of ghats starts at Castle Rock in Uttara Kannada district of Karnataka and ends at Kulem in Goa and has 3 stations en route - Caranzol, Doodhsagar and Sonalium.

Both the uphill as well as the downhill trains have commercial halts at Castle Rock and Kulem which also serve as the stations for attachment and detachment of brakes. But, the trains do not have commercial halts at the three en route stations.

While descending the ghats, a train - whether passenger or freight - has to stop at all the 3 stations for mandatory brake tests; whereas, the uphill trains are not required to halt unless there is a crossing.

== Tourist attraction ==
Its fame is mostly derived from the waterfalls which slide down gracefully in its midst, somewhere in the middle of the ghat with the name Dudhsagar Falls or Sea of Milk.It is one of the most beautiful falls in all of India. The speciality of this location is it is only connected by the railroad. The panorama offer high waterfall as a backdrop to the trains passing right in front of it.

== Train movement ==
The route earlier belonged to the South Central Railway zone of the Indian Railways but after the formation of South Western Railways. In 2003 it came under the Hubli division of South Western Railways.

Tens of thousands of tons of freight move up and down the ghat section. The Braganza Ghat Section is one of the toughest ghat sections in Indian Railways. The ruling gradient here is 1 in 37 which requires the use of bankers. Earlier the Gooty shed's WDM-3A and WDG-3A class ALCO-locomotives were used as triplets, and since 2000, the new modern EMD 710 based WDG-4 locomotives of Hubli shed came into use, still as triplets. The dynamic breaking system installed in the WDG4 locomotives, made them popular and important in this steep section. Once electrification is complete in this section, WAG9 will be heavily used for helping train movement in this section. Hubli is the nearest loco shed has almost 250 of these locos.

There are quite a few passenger trains plying this section. Freight consists mostly of iron ore being transported from the interior regions of Karnataka to the ports for export. In return the rakes bring in coal, fertilizers and the like.

== See also ==
- Dudhsagar Falls
