= Dudhsagar Falls =

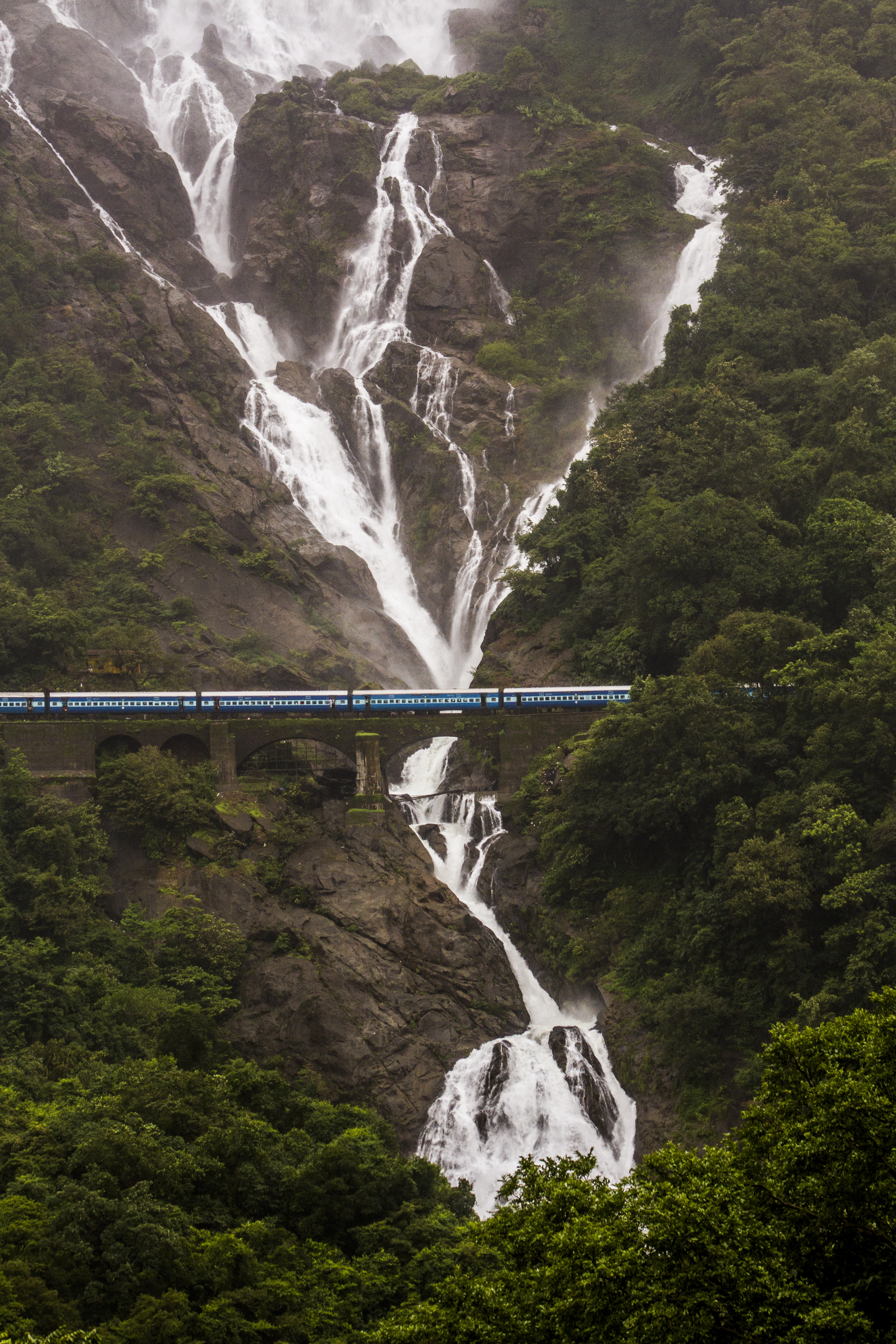
- Dudhsagar Waterfalls in 2015
- Interactive map of Dudhsagar Falls
- Location: Goa-Karnataka border, India
- Coordinates: 15.31277°N 74.31416°E
- Type: Tiered (4 Tiered)
- Total height: 320 metres (1,050 ft)
- Number of drops: 5
- Average width: 30 metres (98 ft)
- Watercourse: Mandovi River

Dudhsagar Falls (lit. 'Sea of Milk') is a four-tiered waterfall on the Mahadayi River in the Indian state of Goa. It is 60km from Panaji by road and is located on the Belagavi–Vasco Da Gama rail route about 46km east of Madgaon and 80km south of Belagavi . Dudhsagar Falls is perched at the top of a crescent shaped valley and surrounded by pristine forests, and it is amongst India's tallest waterfalls with a height of 310 m (1017 feet) and an average width of 30 metres (100 feet).

== Location ==
The falls are located in the Bhagwan Mahaveer Sanctuary and Mollem National Park among the Western Ghats. The falls are a punctuation mark in the journey of the Mandovi River from the Western Ghats to Panjim, where it meets the Arabian Sea. The area is surrounded by deciduous forests with rich biodiversity.

== Accessibility ==
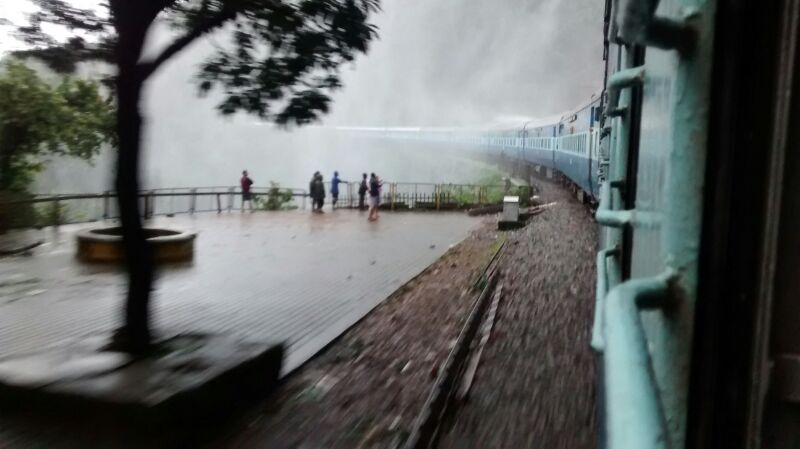
Castle Rock railway station

The nearest rail station accessible by road to the falls is Castle Rock, Uttara Kannada, Karnataka. Visitors could get in a train from here and disembark at the Dudhsagar stop. Recently Indian Railways has banned people from boarding/deboarding passengers at Dudhsagar railway, the same is considered to be an offence under the Railway regulations. People can travel by rails like Amaravati Express to view the waterfall from here

== Dudhsagar trek ==
There are two routes to reach the falls. One is starting the trek from Kulem and following the jeep trail until the bottom of the waterfall. The second option is via the railway track which is roughly around 11 km. This trek is not allowed by the Government of Goa (Forest Department) as it is very risky being on a railway track with minimum safety. Anyone trekking along the Railway trek can be heavily fined and can even land you in jail.

== Gallery ==
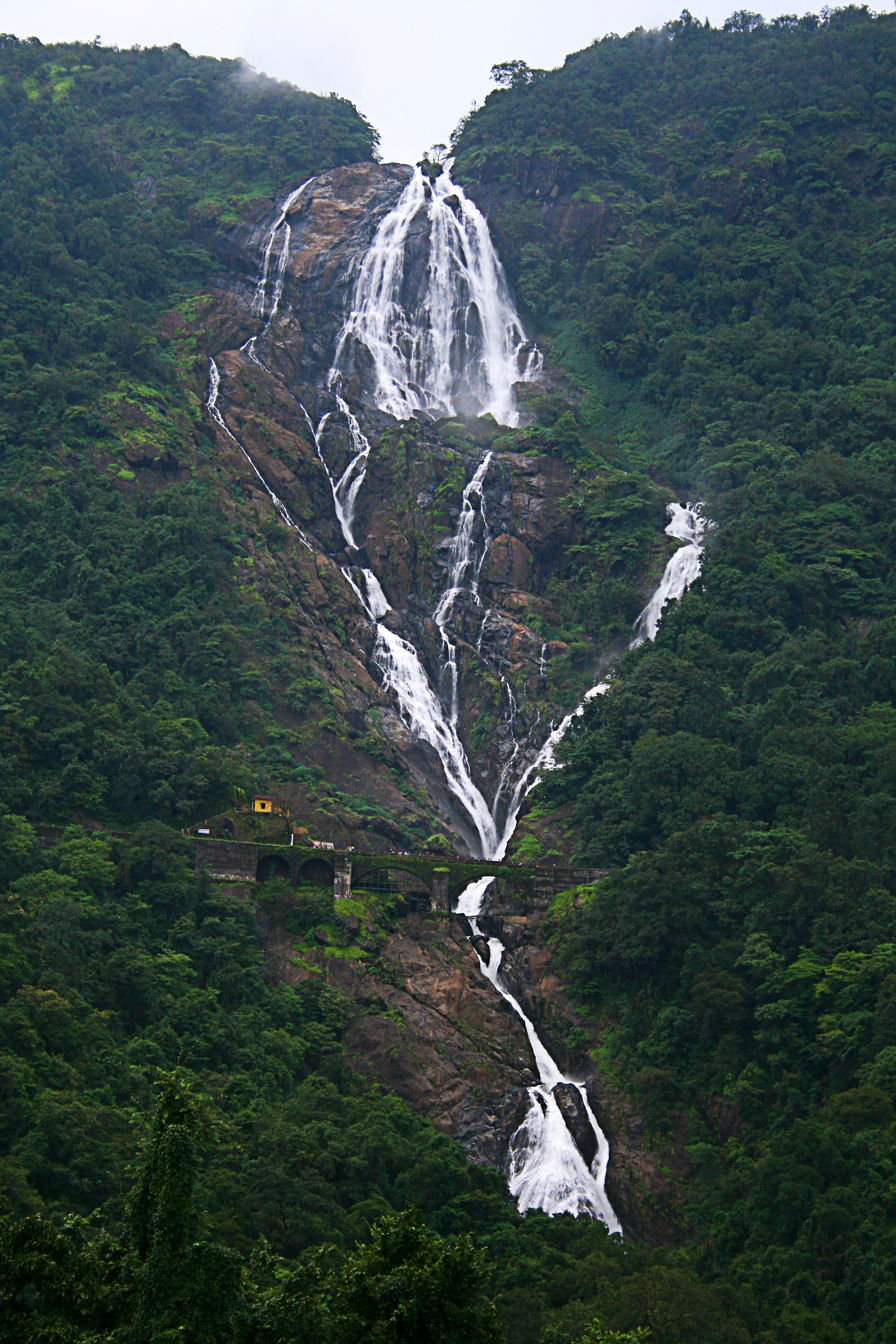
Overall picture

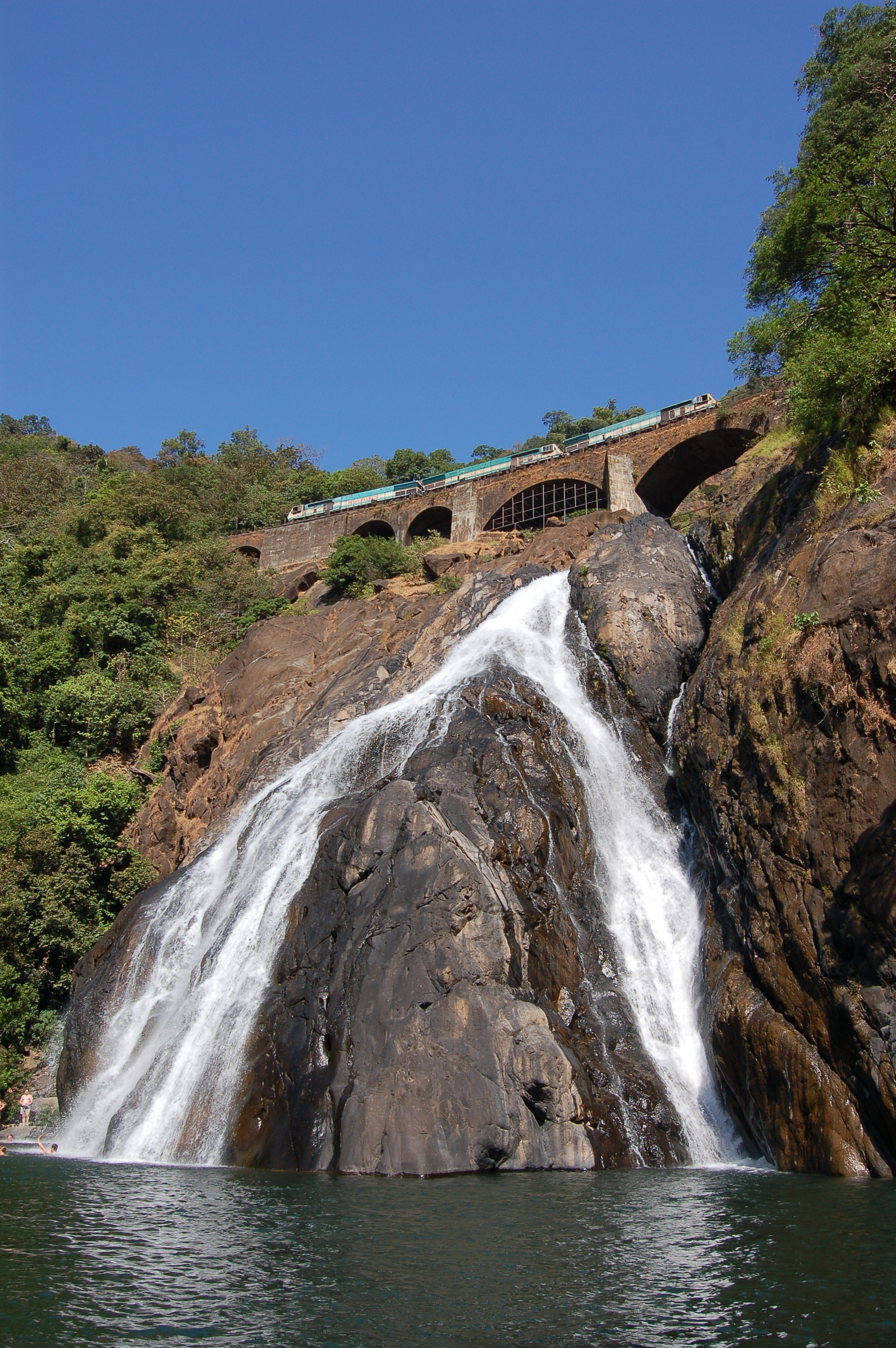
Lower half of Dudhsagar Falls

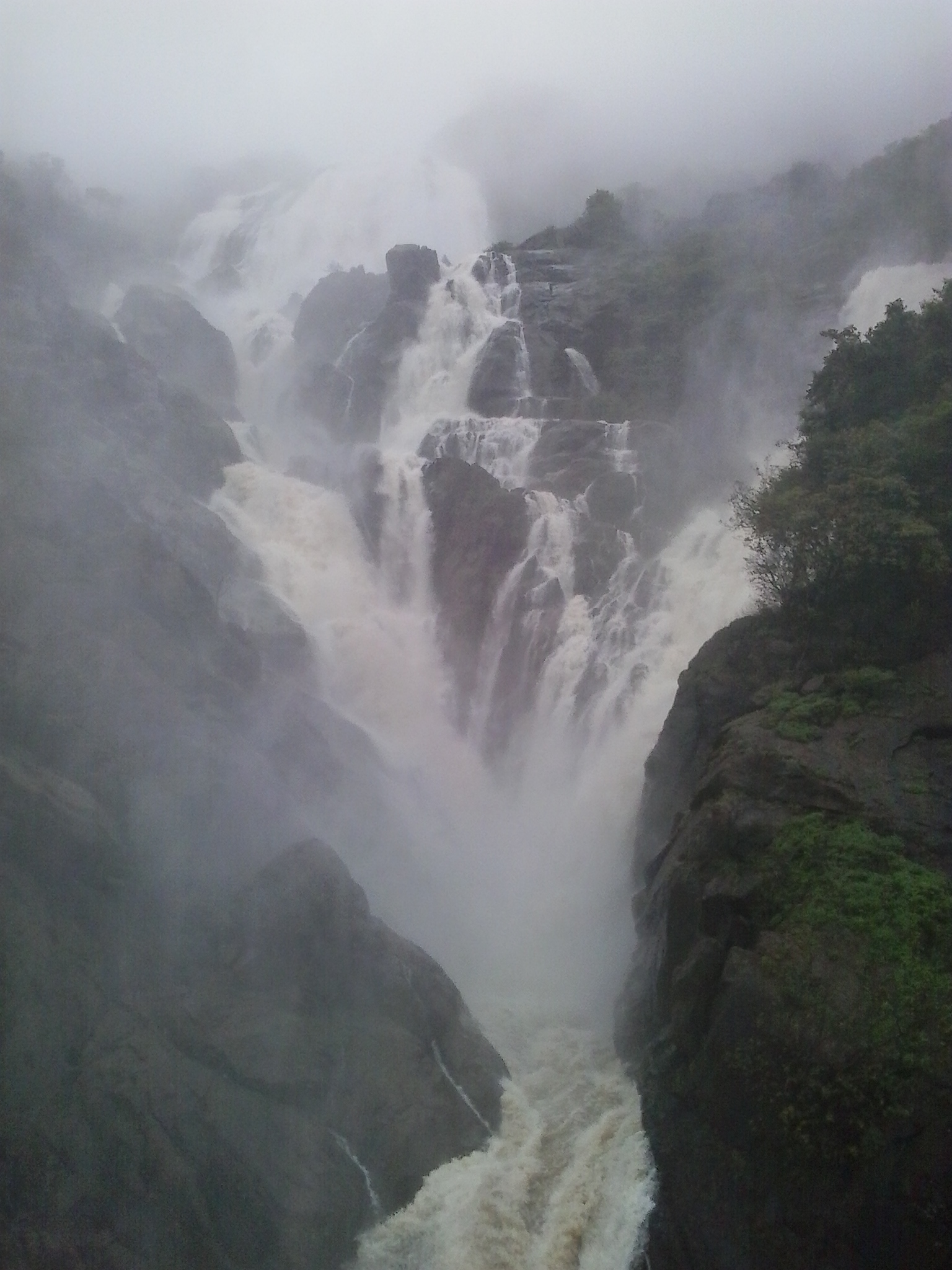
Dudhsagar falls in August

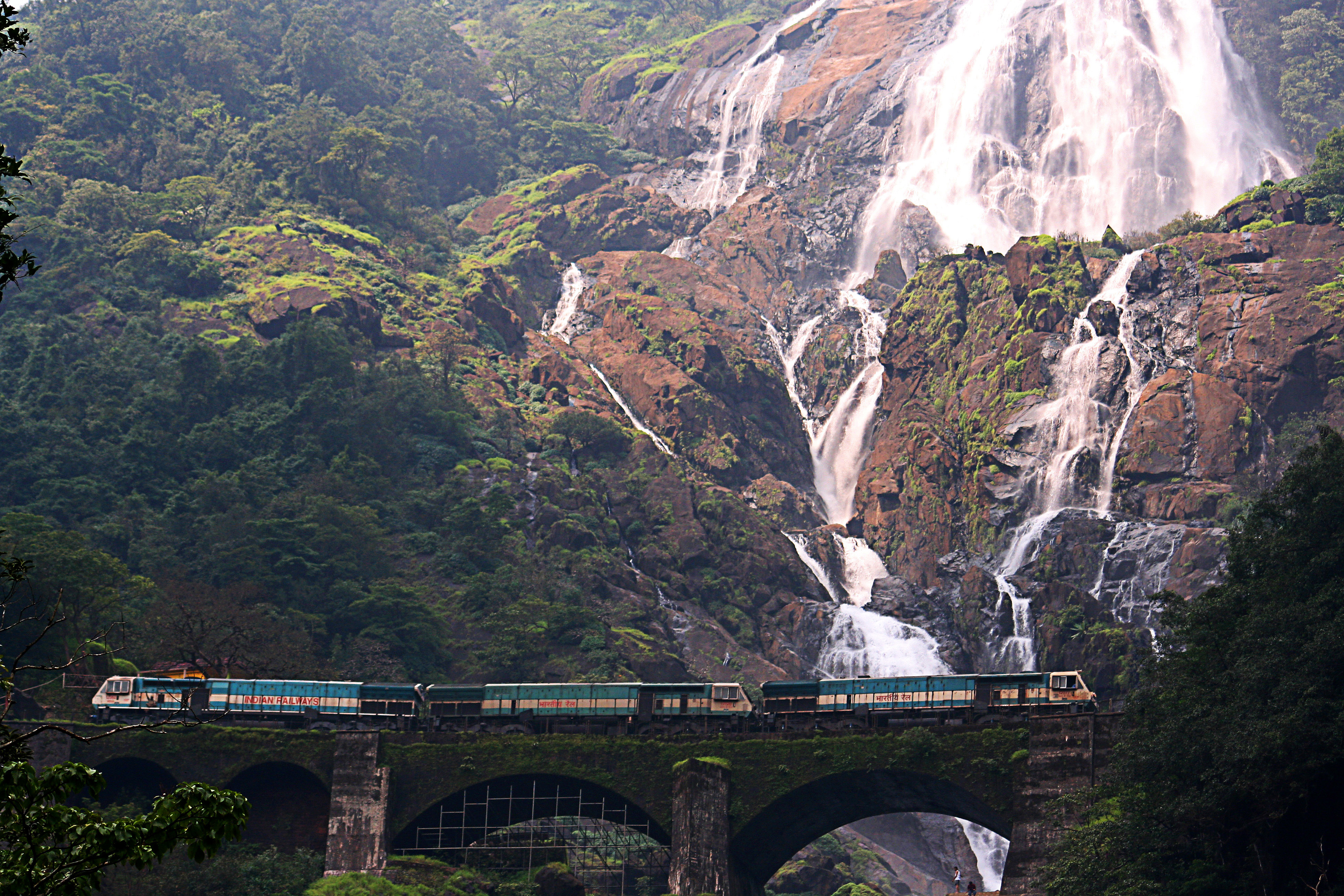
Train passing next to the Dudhsagar Falls

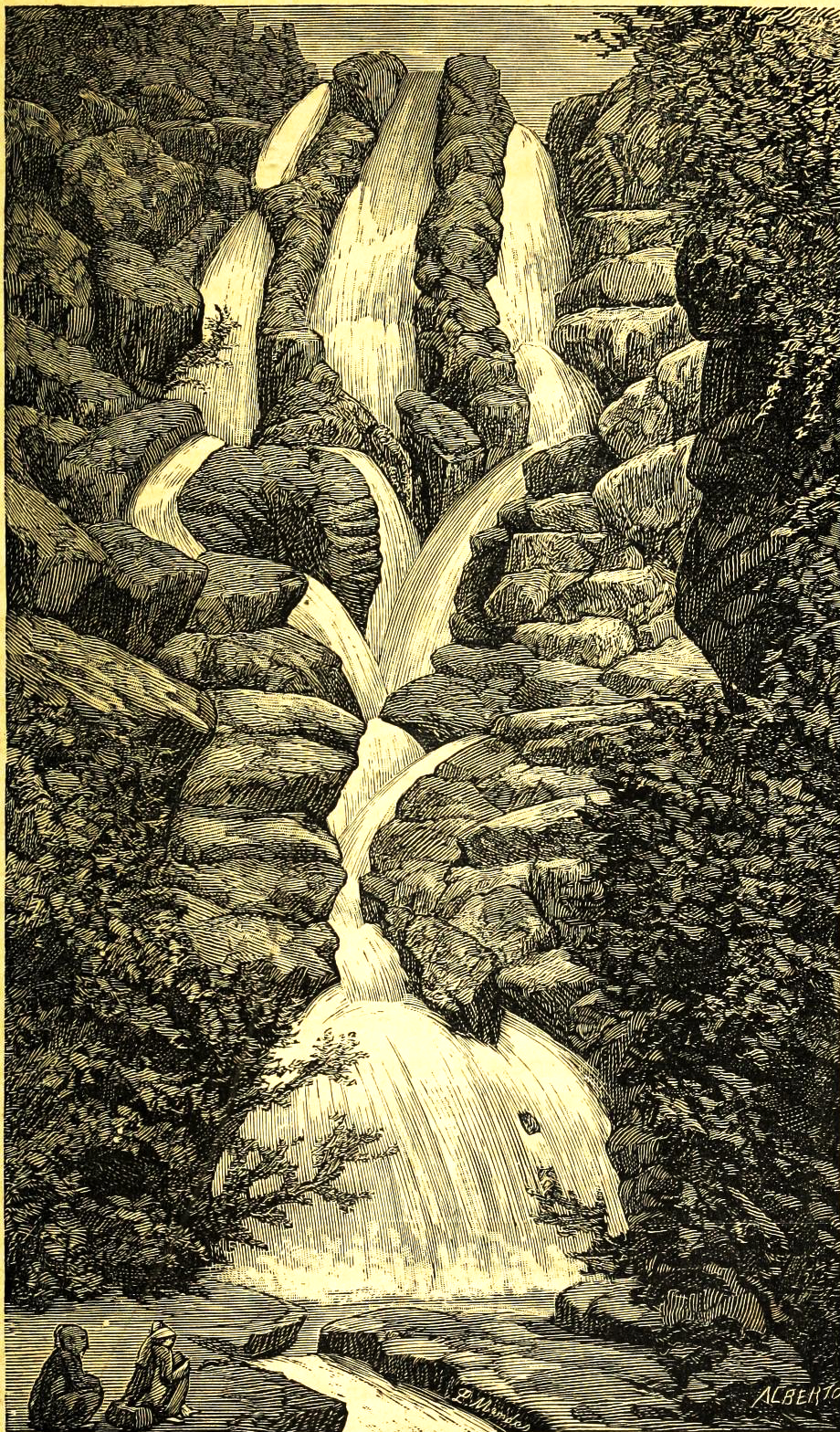
Dudhsagar falls in the early 1850s as seen by Antonio Lopes Mendes

== See also ==
- List of waterfalls
- List of waterfalls in India
- Braganza Ghats
- Bondla Wildlife Sanctuary
