= Navaratnas =

Group of nine extraordinary people in certain kings' courts in India

Navaratnāḥ (Sanskrit dvigu नवरत्न, nava-ratna, Sanskrit pronunciation: [nɐʋɐrɐt̪nɐ], transl. nine jewels) refers to a distinguished assembly of nine learned and virtuous individuals who adorned the royal sabhā (court) of certain illustrious bhūpati-s (kings) in Bhāratavarṣa. These navaratnāḥ were revered for their unparalleled proficiency in various śāstra-s (sciences), kalā-s (arts), and nīti (statecraft). Each ratna embodied excellence in a specific field—be it kāvya (poetry), saṅgīta (music), jyōtiṣa (astronomy), vaidyaśāstra (medicine), tarka (logic), or dharmaśāstra (law and ethics).

Though primarily known from purāṇic and itihāsic traditions, the concept symbolizes the ideal of a king as a patron of jñāna (knowledge) and kalā (art). The most renowned navaratna councils are traditionally associated with Vikramaditya of Ujjain, Akbar of Mughal Empire, and Krishnachandra Roy of Nadīyā.

== Vikramāditya's Navaratnāḥ ==
The court of Vikramaditya, the legendary ruler of Ujjain, is celebrated in traditional accounts for its assemblage of nine illustrious scholars, collectively known as the navaratnāḥ. Their names are preserved in works such as the Jyōtirvidābharaṇa, attributed to Kalidasa, though the text's authenticity is debated among scholars.

These ratna exemplified the zenith of classical Indian intellectual life, each representing mastery over a particular branch of śāstra, kalā, or nīti. The most frequently cited names include:

- Kālidāsa – master of Kāvya (poetry) and nāṭya (drama)
- Varāhamihira – authority on jyōtiṣa (astronomy and astrology)
- Dhanvantari – revered figure in vaidyaśāstra (medicine)
- Amarasiṃha – lexicographer known for the Amarakosha
- Śanku – expert in architectural sciences (śilpaśāstra)
- Ghaṭakarpara – poet of epigrammatic verse
- Vētala Bhatta – known for wit and political counsel
- Kṣapaṇaka – philosopher and sage linked with tarka (logic)
- Vararuci – grammarian associated with vyākaraṇa

Another popular tradition mentions the astronomer Brahmagupta and the magician Vaitālika, instead of Ghaṭakharapara and Vetāla-Bhaṭṭa, among the nine scholars.

These navaratnāḥ reflect an idealized vision of a sovereign as a patron of jñāna and kalā, upholding dharma through the counsel of sages steeped in both learning and artistry.

However, Jyōtirvid-abharaṇa is a literary forgery of a date later than Kālidāsa, and was probably attributed to Kālidāsa to popularize it. Vasudev Vishnu Mirashi dates the work to 12th century, and points out that it could not have been composed by Kālidāsa, because it contains grammatical faults. Other scholars have variously dated the text to the 13th century (Sudhākara Dvivedī), 16th century (Arthur Berriedale Keith), and 18th century (Johan Hendrik Caspar Kern).

There is no mention of such "Navaratnas" in earlier literature. Dineshchandra Sircar calls this tradition "absolutely worthless for historical purposes".

There is no historical evidence to show that these nine scholars were contemporary figures or proteges of the same king. Varārucci is believed to have lived around 3rd or 4th century CE. The period of Kālidāsa is debated, but most historians place him around 5th century CE. Varāhamihira is known to have lived in 6th century CE. Dhanvantari was the author of a medical glossary (Nighantu); his period is uncertain. Amarasiṃha cannot be dated with certainty either, but his lexicon utilizes the works of Dhanavantari and Kālidāsa; therefore, he cannot be dated to 1st century BCE, when the legendary Vikramāditya is said to have established the Vikram Samvat in 57 BCE. Not much is known about Śaṅku, Vetalabhatta, Kṣapanaka and Ghaṭakarpara. Some Jain writers identify Siddhasenadivākarasuri as Kṣapanaka, but this claim is not accepted by historians.

Kālidāsa is the only figure whose association with Vikramāditya is mentioned in works earlier than Jyōtirvidābharaṇa. Rajashekhara's Kāvyamimāṃsā (10th century), Bhoja's Śṛṅgāra Prakāśa (11th century) and Kṣhemendra's Āucitya-Vicāra-Carcā (11th century) mention that Vikramāditya sent Kālidāsa as his ambassador to the Kuntala country (identified with present-day Uttara Kannada). The historicity of these legends is doubtful.

== Akbar's Navaratna ==
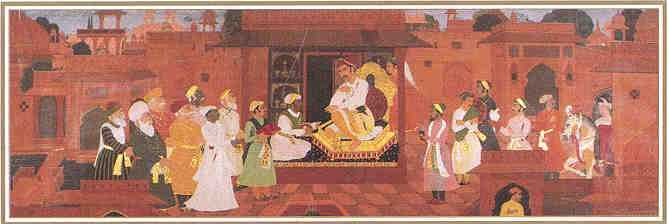
Some of the purported Navaratnas in Emperor Akbar's Court: Tansen, Todar Mal, Abul Fazl, Faizi and Abdul Rahim Khan-i-Khanan, c. 16th century

According to popular tradition, the court of the Mughal ruler Akbar had nine intellectuals called the Navarāṭṇas or the nine gems. As in Vikramāditya's case, this tradition has no historical basis. According to historian Govind Sakharam Sardesai, Hindu paṇḍits in the court of Shah Jahan or Dara Shikoh - Jagannāthrai or Kavindrachārya - may have started this tradition.

Since this tradition is historically inaccurate, the names of the nine gems varies between sources. Some of the names included in various lists include:

- Abu'l-Faẓl ibn Mubārak
- Fāʿiẓī
- Ṭōḍar Mal
- Mān Siṃha I
- Rāja Bīrbal
- Mullā Dō-Pyāza (often depicted as mythical)
- Tānsēn
- Ḥakīm Ḥumām
- Bairam Khān
- ʽAbd al-Qādir Badayūnī

For example, a painting kept at the Lālā Śrī Rāmdās Library (Delhi) in the 1940s depicts the following people as the nine gems: ʽAbd ar-Raḥīm, Ṭōḍar Mal, Mān Siṃha, Bīrbal, Miyān Kōkultāś, Ḥakīm Ḥumām, Abu'l-Ḥasan, Abu'l-Faẓl, and Fāʿiẓī.

== Raja Krishnachandra Roy's Navaratnas ==
Krishnachandra Roy was a ruler of Bengal, who ruled over 1727 to 1772. According to legend, his court had 9 famous scholars, who are mentioned as ‘Nabaratnas’ (Bengali: নবরত্ন, romanized: nôbôrôtnô, lit. 'nine jewels'). These included

1. Bhāratchandra Rāygunākar,
2. Ramprasad Sen,
3. Bāneśwar Bidyālankār,
4. Kṛṣṇādhana Rāy,
5. Rāmmohan Goswāmī,
6. Madhusūdana Nyāyālankār,
7. Jagannath Tarka Panchanan
8. Harirām Tarkasiddhānta.
9. Gopal Bhar,

== Similar groups ==
Many famous emperors in India had courtiers labeled in similar ways. For example, the valuable members of the court of Krishnadevaraya were termed Ashtadiggajas, the eight scholars. Lakṣmaṇa Sena the ruler of the Sena dynasty had Pañcaratnas (meaning 5 gems who were Govardhana, Śaraṇa, Jayadeva (author of Gīta Gōvinda), Umapati, Dhoyi in his court). Ashta Pradhan maṇḍala was the title given to the council of Shivaji.
