= Tarikh-i Alfi =

Mughal millennial history of Islamic lands

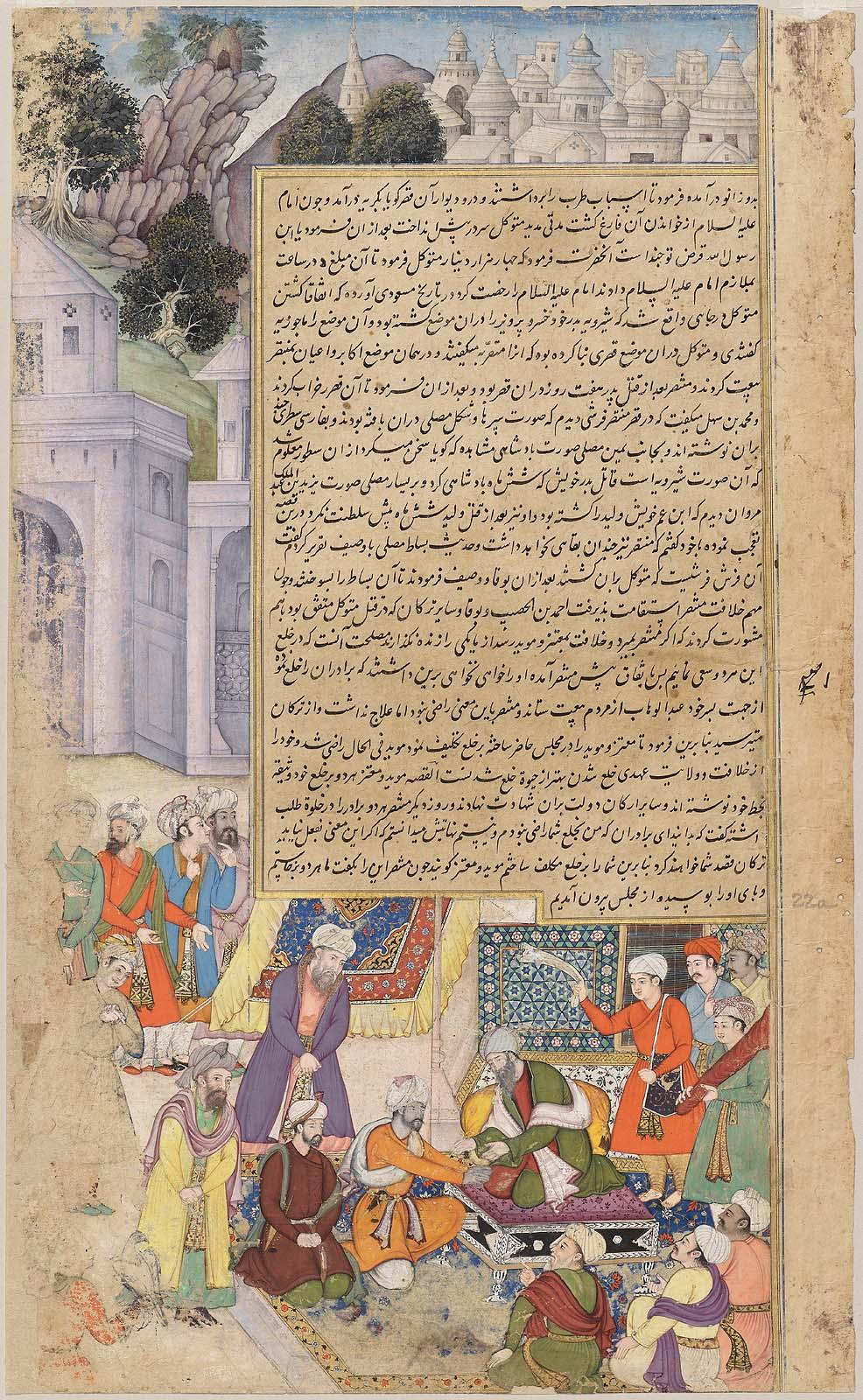
- Page from an illustrated manuscript of the Tarikh-i Alfi, depicting a meeting between the Abbasid caliph al-Mutawakkil and the 11th of the Twelve Imams, Hasan al-Askari; c. 1593, Museum of Fine Arts, Boston
- Author: Mulla Ahmad Thattavi; Abul Fazl; Jafar Beg; Naqib Khan; Fathullah Shirazi; Badayuni; Haji Ibrahim Sarhindi; Hakim Humam Gilani; Hakim Ali Gilani; Nizam al-din Ahmad Heravi
- Language: Persian
- Genre: World history
- Publication date: c. 1593/1594

The Tarikh-i Alfi (Persian: تاریخ الفی, lit. 'History of a Thousand') is a 16th-century Persian-language universal history compiled at the court of the Mughal emperor Akbar. The work is a millenarian text that attempts to document the political history of the Islamic world over the span of one thousand years, from the death of the Islamic prophet Muhammad to Akbar's reign in the late sixteenth century. Co-authored by a collection of scholars over approximately twelve years, the work was a foundational text in the Mughal court's historiography, and positions Akbar as a messianic philosopher-king.

== Writing ==
The Tarikh-i Alfi was commissioned in the 1580s by Mughal emperor Akbar, in light of the new Islamic millennium which would begin on 19 October 1591. The purpose of the text was to commemorate the first Islamic millennium by compiling a history of Islamic kingdoms during the thousand-year span. A committee of seven scholars was appointed by Akbar, and the project was to be coordinated by Abul Fazl, scholar and courtier of Akbar, who would go on to write the introduction and epilogue of the text. The seven scholars were polymaths with diverse backgrounds. The most accomplished scholar of the seven, and the one designated to begin the project, was Naqib Khan; famed for his knowledge of history, he was an immigrant from Safavid Iran, and his grandfather had authored another world history titled Lubb al-tawarīkh. Another contributor was Fathullah Shirazi, also an immigrant from Safavid Iran; his expertise in astronomy helped him design a new regnal calendar for Akbar. The two other contributors with origins in Safavid Iran were the brothers Hakim Humam Gilani and Hakim Ali Gilani, both of whom were royal physicians. Nizam al-din Ahmad Heravi was a contributor to the project; he was a scholar born in the Indian subcontinent, but his family was from Herat, and unlike the other scholars his family was of a military background. The other two Indian contributors were Abd al-Qadir Badayuni and Haji Ibrahim Sarhindi. The three scholars of India followed the Sunni creed, while the Gilanis and Shirazi were Shi'ites; Naqib Khan's religious leanings are ambiguous, as he was labelled a Sunni in Iran and suspected to be a Shi'ite in the Mughal court.

The original strategy for the text was to have the seven scholars rotate, with each writing the history of one year over the span of one week. After thirty-five years had been compiled (i.e. five rotations of writing), Akbar was persuaded by Abul Fath Gilani to disband the seven scholars and assign the task of compilation to another scholar and polymath named Mulla Ahmad Thattavi, an immigrant from Safavid Iran with strong Shi'ite views. This was disliked by Badayuni and some of the other original scholars. Thattavi brought a tone of sectarianism to the Tarikh. He made revisions to the portion of the work that had already been completed. He went on to write the first two volumes of the work before his death in 1588, when he was assassinated by a Mughal nobleman named Mirza Fulad Barlas, who held a grudge against him. The task of compiling the third volume was assigned to Jafar Beg, an immigrant from Qazvin in Safavid Iran with less sectarian views, who brought his universalist view of world history to bear. In 1591/1592, Baduyuni was tasked with editing the first two volumes, while Jafar Beg supervised the third. The text was completed around 1593/1594 and presented to Akbar, having taken around twelve years; the manuscript was subsequently illustrated with paintings.

The historical narratives presented in the Tarikh were derived from preexisting Arabic and Persian sources, and reinterpreted to fit the goal of the imperial project. Mulla Ahmad's extensive treatment of Mongol history stems from Ilkhanid and Timurid chronicles, namely the Tarikh-i Jahangusha and the Jami al-Tawarikh. Jafar Beg's coverage of Ottoman history in the third volume heavily leans on the Tarikh-i Hasht Bihisht by Idris Bitlisi. He also refers to the Tarikh-i Rashidi by Mirza Haidar Dughlat for the political history of Moghulistan.

== Content ==
The Tarikh-i Alfi is one of the few historiographical texts in Arabic or Persian literature that deals with the first Hijri millennium. It is a vast work that documents the history of the Islamic world over the course of a millennium, with emphasis on the political history of kingdoms. It consists of around 6000 printed pages, and loosely falls into three volumes. The first volume begins with the death of the Islamic prophet Muhammad around 632 CE and ends with the conquests of Genghis Khan. The second volume begins by describing the subsequent conquests of the Mongols, and their political aftermath in Asia. The third volume begins with the rule of the Ilkhanid Ghazan Khan and ends with the events surrounding the consolidation of the Mughal Empire, and the early years of Akbar's reign. The Tarikh's convention of starting its chronicle from the death of the Prophet rather than his birth was a radical departure from Islamic calendars and chronicles of the time, which used the Hijrah of Muhammad in 622 as the start of the millennium. Scholars have pointed out that by opening the text with the passing of a central figure, the Tarikh makes the suggestion that the world was in need of a new prophetic figure, poising the text to introduce Akbar as the king that could be the figurehead of the second millennium. The political history and ideology of the Mongols features as a prominent topic in the Tarikh, through which the authors draw connections to the Mughal emperor himself and his political legitimacy over the world. The Tarikh portrays Akbar as a messianic figure appearing at the dawn of the second millennium.

== Legacy ==
Modern scholars have pointed out that the Tarikh-i Alfi has received insufficient scholarly attention, partially because the work is vast and dispersed. Scholarship of the Mughal Empire has instead focused on the Tarikh's immediate successor, the Akbarnama authored by Abul Fazl. Historian Sanjay Subrahmanyam suggests that the Tarikh-i Alfi was sidelined by Akbar himself in favor of the Akbarnama as the official court chronicle.
