= Razmnama =

Persian translation of the Sanskrit epic Mahabharata

Razmnāma
- رزم‌نامه
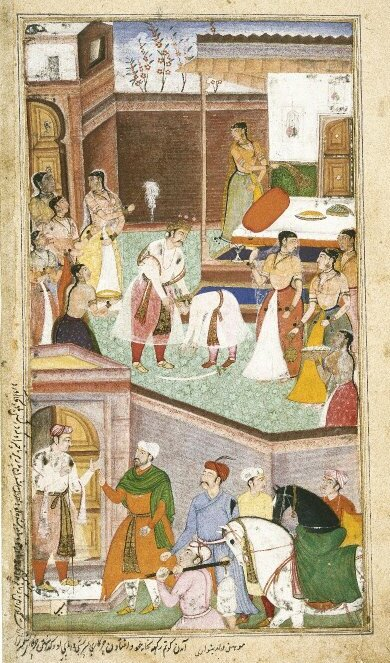
- Leaf of the Razmnama, c. 1598-1599

Information
- Author: Faizi; Vyasa (traditionally)
- Language: Classical Persian
- Period: Reign of Emperor Akbar

The Razmnāma (Persian: رزم‌نامه, romanized: Razm-nāma, lit. 'book of war, tale of war') is a Persian translation of the Sanskrit epic Mahabharata, commissioned by the Mughal emperor Akbar. In 1574, Akbar started a Maktab Khana or "House of Translation" in his new capital at Fatehpur Sikri. He assigned a group to translate the Sanskrit books Rajatarangini, Ramayana, and Mahabharata into the Persian language, the literary language of the Mughal court.

Akbar's court translations were made in several steps: the meaning was explained by Hindu scholars and a first draft was made by the Muslim theologian Naqib Khan into Persian and this was then improved upon by Faizi into elegant prose or verse. In Persian, razm (from Arabic) means “war” and nāma means "tale", "history", or "epic"; the name razmnāma, therefore, means "a tale of war".

Four illustrated Mughal manuscripts are known, one complete, made between 1584 and 1586, and now in Jaipur, with 176 paintings of which 147 were reproduced in 1884 by Thomas Holbein Hendley. The final five parts (of 18) from another, made between 1598 and 1599 and split up in 1921, form British Library, MS Or. 12076 and has other pages spread out in collections across North America, Europe and India. A third, known as the Birla manuscript, is in the Birla Academy of Art and Culture in Kolkata and in dated 1605. A fourth, from which only two or more miniatures are currently identified, was made around 1616–1617.

== Translation process ==
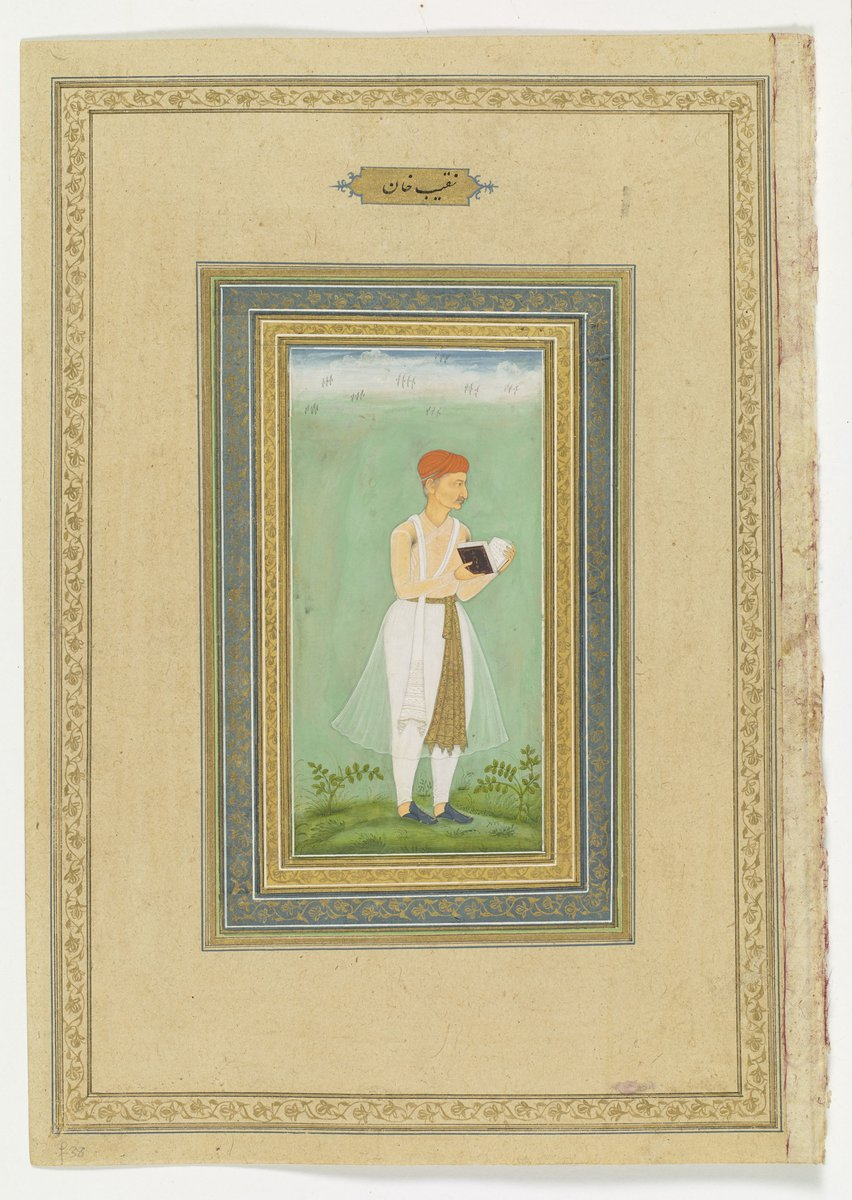
Naqib Khan, translator and abridger of the Razmnama

Contemporary author ʽAbd al-Qadir Badayuni's Muntakhab at-Tawārīkh describes the translation process:

Collecting together the learned men of India, His Majesty directed that the book Mahabharat should be translated. For some nights His Majesty personally (had it) explained to Naqib Khan, who wrote out the resultant text in Persian. On the third night His Majesty summoned me and ordered me to translate it in collaboration with Naqib Khan. In three or four months out of the eighteen chapters (fan) of that stock of useless fables... I wrote out two chapters... Thereafter Mulla Shiri and Naqib Khan completed that section, and one section Sultan Haji Thanesari ʻMunfaridʼ brought to completion. Sheikh Faizi was then appointed to write it in verse and prose, but he too did not complete more than two Chapters (fan). Again, the said Haji wrote out two sections and rectified the errors which were committed in the first round, and fitting one part with another, compiled a hundred fasciculi. The direction was to establish exactitude in a minute manner so that nothing of the original should be lost. In the end upon some fault, His Majesty ordered him (Haji Thanesari) to be dismissed and sent away to Bhakkar, his native city, where he still is. Most of the interpreters and translators are in hell along with Korus and Pandavs, and as for the remaining ones, may God save them, and mercifully destine them to repent.... His Majesty named the work Razmnama (epic), and had it illustrated and transcribed in many copies, and the nobles too were ordered to have it transcribed by way of obtaining blessings. Shaikh Abul Fazl... wrote a preface of the length of two quires (juzw) for that work.

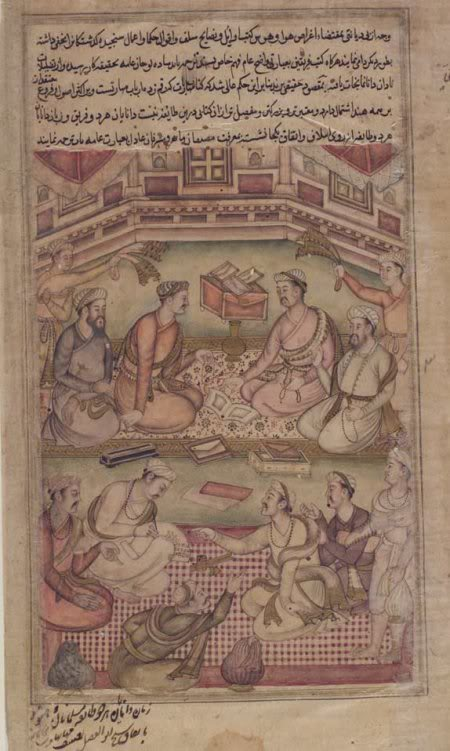
Hindu and Muslim scholars discuss the Mahabharat translation.

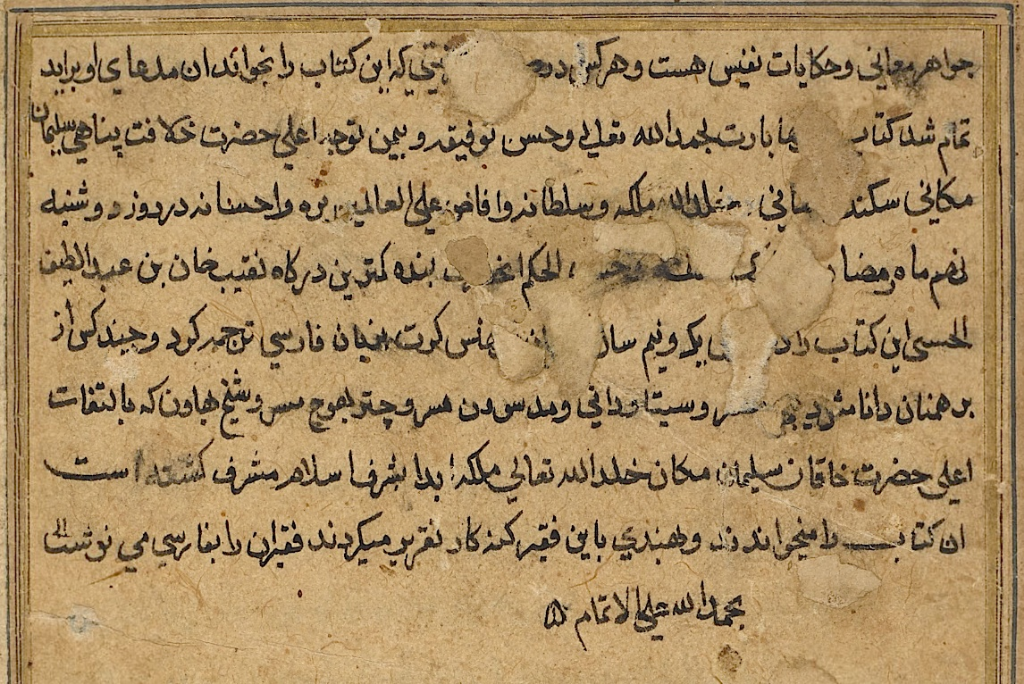
Last page of Razmnama

The following details are preserved on some copies of the translation:

Naqīb Khān, son of ʻAbd al-Laṭīf Ḥusaynī, translated [this work] from Sanskrit into Persian in one and a half years. Several of the learned Brahmans, such as Deva Miśra, Śatāvadhāna, Madhusūdana Miśra, Caturbhuja and Shaykh Bhāvan…read this book and explained it in hindī to me, a poor wretched man, who wrote it in Persian.

== First copy ==
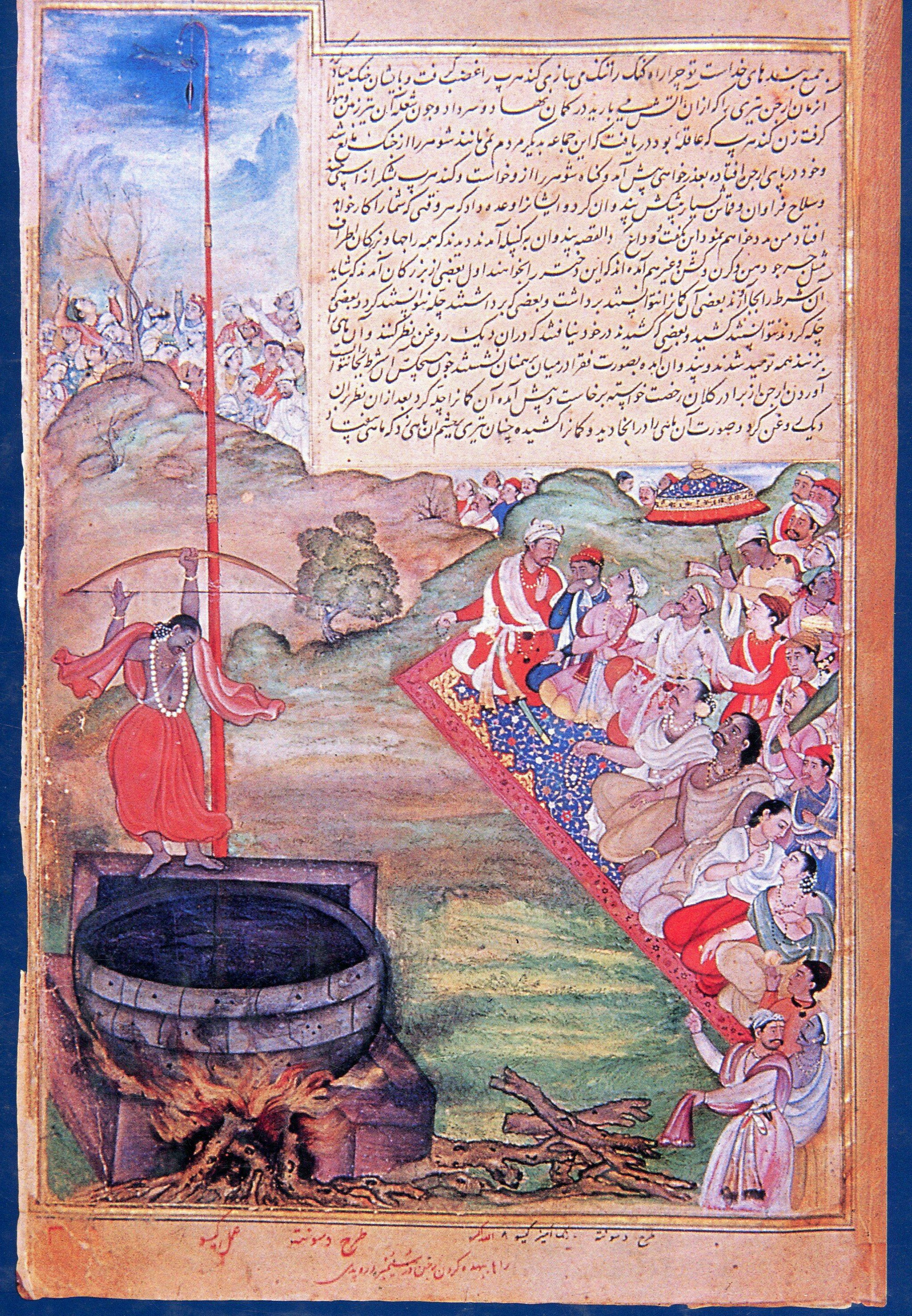
Arjuna hits the target by artist Daswant and Keshav from the Jaipur copy of Akbar.

In 1582 an order was passed to translate the Mahabharata into Persian. The translation work of the Mahabharata, which has one lakh (100,000) shlokas, was carried out during the period 1584–1586. Some copies contain this inscription:

Naqīb Khān, son of ʻAbd al-Laṭīf Ḥusaynī, translated [this work] from Sanskrit into Persian in one and a half years. Several of the learned Brahmans, such as Deva Miśra, Śatāvadhāna, Madhusūdana Miśra, Caturbhuja and Shaykh Bhāvan…read this book and explained it in Hindi to me, a poor wretched man, who wrote it in Persian.

Today a copy of the work can be found in the City Palace Museum of Jaipur, with many paintings by Mushfiq. Abul Fazl wrote the preface for this Razmnama. In folio 11 of this copy Abul Fazl give date 1588 A.D. of his prefer. The Jaipur Razmnama, written by Khwaja Inayatullah on paper from Daulatabad, contains 169 full-page miniatures with Name of Artist. Jaipur Razmnama has seal of Akbar, Shah Jahan and Shah Alam II. In this manuscript, 169 episodes are illustrated in this manuscript. The artists of this copy were Basawan, Daswanth and Lal. 147 illustrations of this Razmnama manuscript were reproduced in T.H. Hendley book Memorials of the Jeypore Exhibition in 1883.

== Second copy ==
The second copy of the Razmnama was completed between 1598 and 1599. When compared with the first copy, the second copy is more elaborate, with 161 paintings. The copies were sent to members of royal families as gifts to help them understand the Hindu religion better. According to Akbar's courtier ʽAbd al-Qadir Badayuni, Akbar ordered the copies to be sent to all the emirs of his kingdom, with instructions to receive them as a gift from the God. According to the preface written by Abul Fazl the historian in Akbar's court, the intention behind these gifts and their distribution was very pious.

== See also ==
- Razmnama (British Library, Or. 12076)
