= Razmnama (British Library, Or. 12076) =

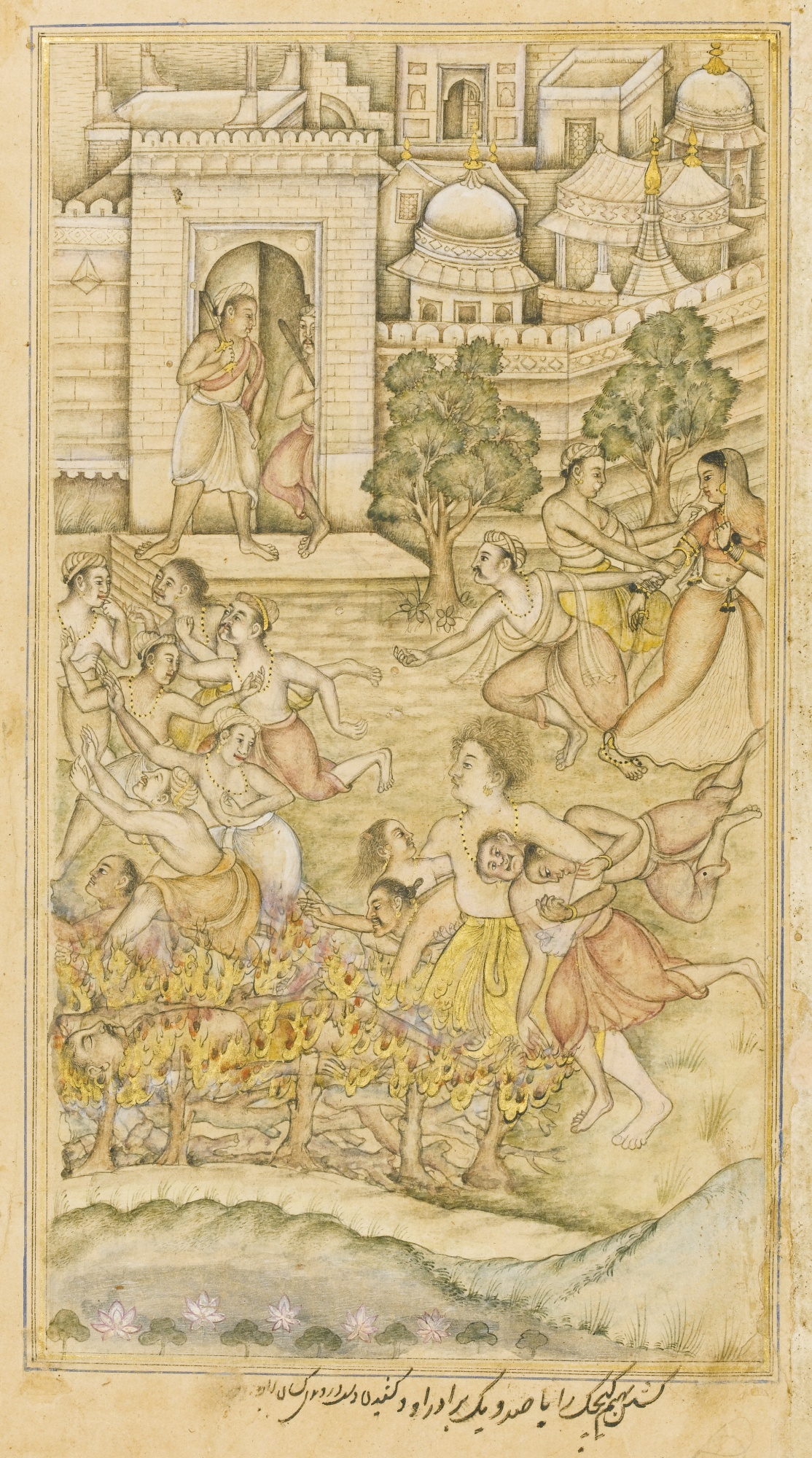
Bhima Kills Kichaka and his brothers, by Dhannu. Though from the same copy, this folio is not in the British Library, and uses much less colour than most folios.

The Razmnama, British Library Or.12076 is an incomplete illustrated Mughal manuscript of the Razmnama, which is a translation of the Hindu epic Mahabharata written by Naqib Khan, and copied in AH 1007 (1598/99). It contains sections 14–18, the concluding part of the work, with some detached parts. There are 24 full-page Mughal paintings of high quality, all attributed to artists (two artists in three cases). It is the second of the four surviving Mughal illustrated manuscripts, described in the BL catalogue as "Sub-imperial Mughal".

British Library ("BL"), Or. 12076 has 138 folios which were already numbered when bought, the numbers running from 715 to 846, with others not numbered, but several leaves missing from the text.

== History ==
The manuscript appeared in an auction at Sotheby's in London in 1921 (24-25 Oct. 1921, lot 203), when the BL portion was bought for £76 by the art historian Gerald Reitlinger (then only 21). It appeared again at Sotheby's in 1954 (Lot 230, Sotheby's sale 8 Nov. 1954), and was bought by a dealer who sold it to the British Museum (now BL) a few weeks later.

In the 1921 sale, several lots included parts of the manuscript, which had presumably recently been divided for the sale, and altogether the locations of 161 miniatures are known, and were recorded by Seyller. The location of the "remaining portions" of the text, sold to a dealer for £1, are not known. A further eight leaves later reached the BL as British Library Add.Or. 2776–2783.

British Library, Or. 12076 has only the last five sections (Parwa) of 18 in the whole work. The text follows the Jaimini version of Ashvamedhika Parva.

== Miniatures ==
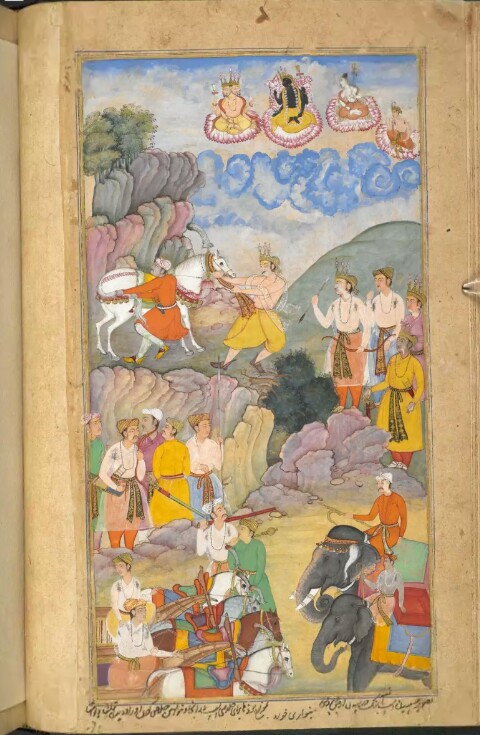
Arjuna and his men attempt to free the white horse from the rock. Artist: Banavari Khurd

As described by the British Library catalogue, the 24 miniatures are:

- f.4v. Krishna and the Pandavas being told by the sage Vyasa where to obtain the horse for the sacrifice (‘asvamedha’). (Mohan ibn Banwari).
- f.7v. The discovery of the horse, Syamakarna, by Bhima who is sitting on the mountain above the city of Bhadravati watching the soldiers of the army of Raja Yauvanasva. (Narayan Khurd).
- f.13v. Bhima arriving at the castle of Dvaraka to invite Krishna to the ‘asvamedha’. Krishna who is with his wife Satyabhama pretends not to hear. (Bhawani).
- f.17r. The horse being taken to the ‘zanana’ so that Krishna's wives and the Pandava ladies can see it. Krishna is drinking with Yudhisthira. (Bhagwan).
- f.20r. Anusalva who had stolen the horse being forced by Vrsaketu, Karna's son, to bow down in submission before Yudhisthira and Krishna. (Lohanka).
- f.23v. The god Agni creating the fire to help his father-in-law Raja Niladhvaja of Malwa whilst Arjuna quenches the flames with magic arrows which produced springs of water. (Ahmad Kashmiri).
- f.26v. Arjuna trying to free the horse from the rock watched by the other Pandavas. Brahma, Visnu, Siva and Indra are in the sky. (Banwari Khurd).
- f.35b. Suratha, second son of Raja Hamsadhvaja, challenging Arjuna and his charioteer Krishna after the death of his brother Sudhanvan. (As ibn Mahesh). f.44r. Arjuna treating his son Babhruvahana with contempt in Manipur. (Khem).
- f.48r. Rama's servant listening to the dhobi quarrelling with his wife. (Da’ud, brother of Daulat). f.5lar. Laksmana abandoning Sita in the forest on the orders of Rama. (Makar). *
- f.56r. The battle between Kusa and Naga in which Kusa killed Naga's elephant and then cut off Naga's arm. (Dharmdas Lunj). f.62v. Kusa and Lava defeating Bharata, Laksmana and the monkey army. (As ibn Mahesh).
- f.67r. Babhruvahana decimating Arjuna's army. (Bulaqi ibn Ghulam ‘Ali).
- f.71v. Battle between Babhruvahana, son of Arjuna, and the snakes in the nether regions. Babhruvahana used arrows which turned into the natural enemies of the snakes such as storks, peacocks and ants and obtained the jewel which saved Arjuna’s life. (Sangha).
- f.76r. Battle between the armies of Arjuna and Tamradhvaja. Brahma and other deities in the sky. (Paras).
- f.80v. Viravarman, Raja of Sarasvata, falling to the ground as Hanuman overturns his chariot with his tail, watched by Krishna. (Ibrahim Qahhar).
- f.83v. Candrahasa kneeling before the Raja of Kuntala on being presented to him by the minister Dhrstabuddhi after Candrahasa’s victory over the king’s enemies. The elephants, horses and hawk are booty from the enemy. (Kanhar).
- f.87v. Madana, Visaya’s brother, explaining to his father Dhrstabuddhi how she (Visaya) came to be married to Candrahasa. (Dhanu). f.90v. Candrahasa sacrificing himself at the temple of Candika by cutting off pieces of his own flesh and putting them on the fire. A male divinity is trying to restore him to life while Dhrstabuddhi and Madana lie dead nearby. (Qabil ibn Maqbul).
- f.95r. Krishna telling Bhima of Arjuna’s exploits to which the women also listen. (Banwari Khurd).
- f.106r. Yudhisthira and Dhrtarastra together when the latter renounces his kingdom. (Hajji).
- f.110v. Gandhari, blindfolded, supporting Dhrtarastra and following Kunti when Dhrtarastra became old and infirm and retired to the forest. (Dhanu). f.130v. Arjuna burning the bodies after the battle between the Andhakas and Yadavas at Prabhasa on the coast of Gujarat. Ghee is being poured on the funeral pyre. (Narayan).

British library Razmnama has 24 Miniatures with two ditched Miniatures by 21 different Artists. Illustration like "suggestion of vyasa"(4b), "Bhima Discovers horse"(7b), "Rama's servant listens gossip about sita"(48a), "Dhitrashtra retirement"(106a and 110b) and "cremation of yadavas"(130b) are completely absent in Razmnama of Akbar and Rahim.

While "Bhima arrives at Dwarka"(13b), "Fight with Niladhwaja"(23b), "Horse stuck at vindhya"(26b), "Arjuna spurns Babhruvahana"(44a), "Viravarma episode"(80b) and "Sacrifice of Chandrahasa"(90b) illustrated in All three manuscript of Razmnama of Akbar, Rahim and British library copy.

== Gallery ==
Razmnama
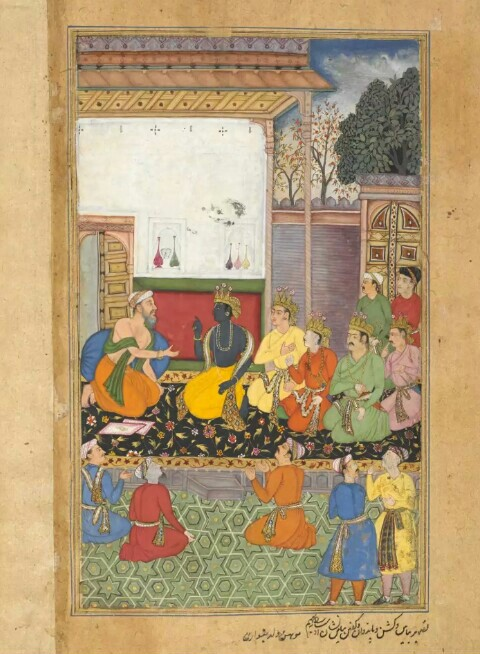
Vyasa gave suggestion of Ashwamedha, Artist Mohana

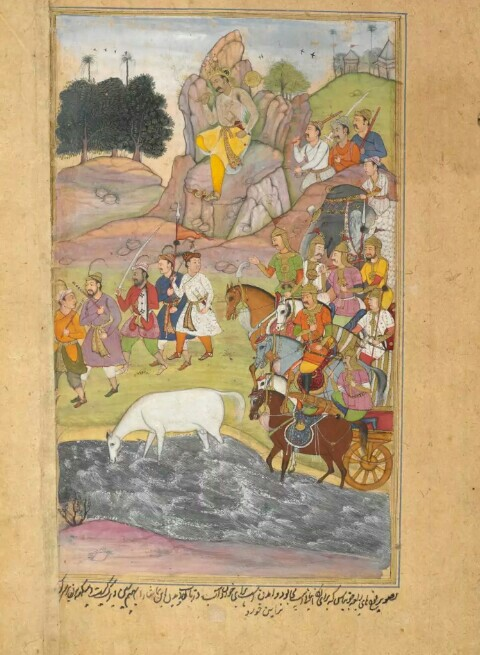
Bhima discovers the white horse while watching the army of Yauvanasva from above the city of Bhadravati. Artist Narayana khurd

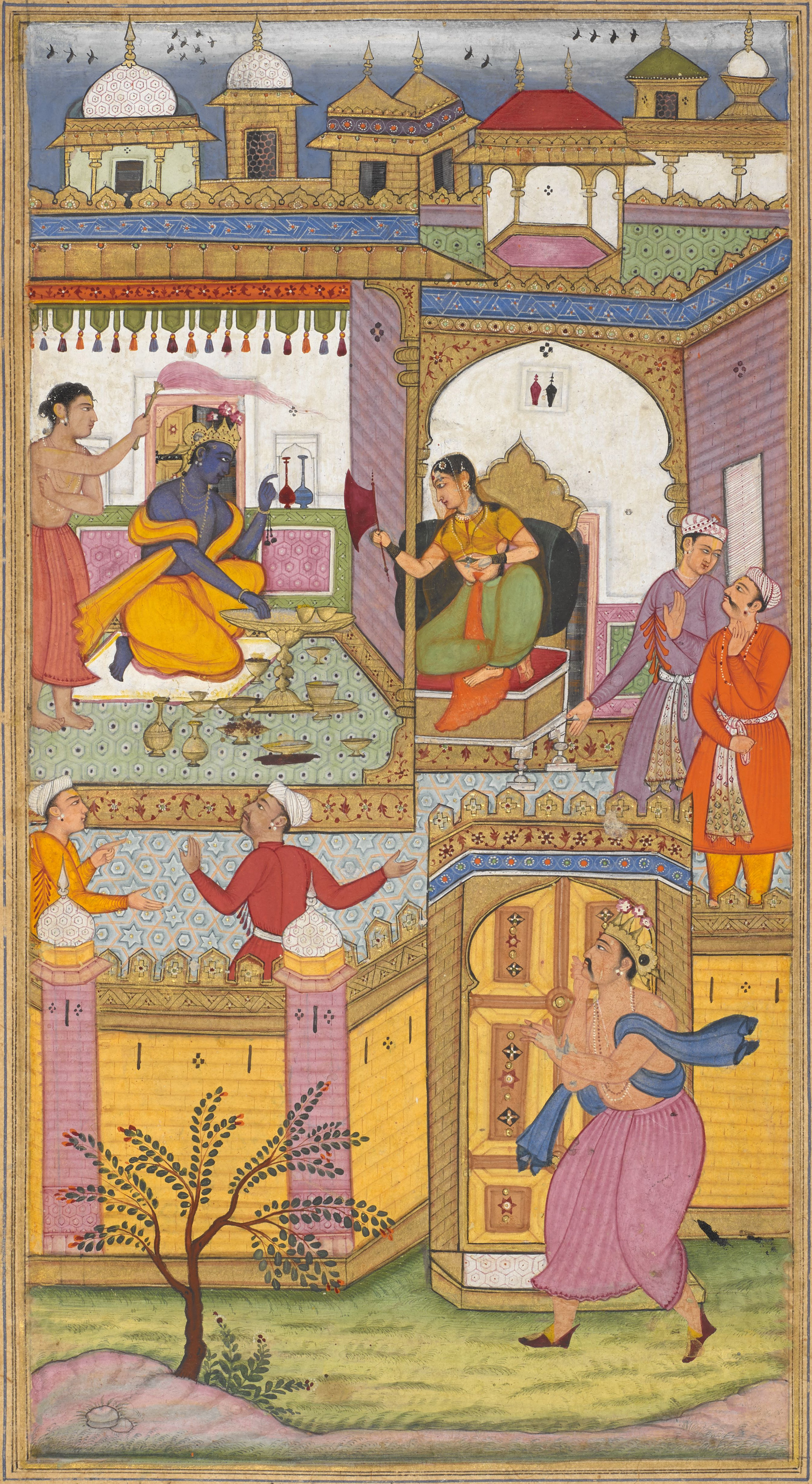
Bhima arrive Dwarka while Krishna serve satyabhama. Artist Bhawani

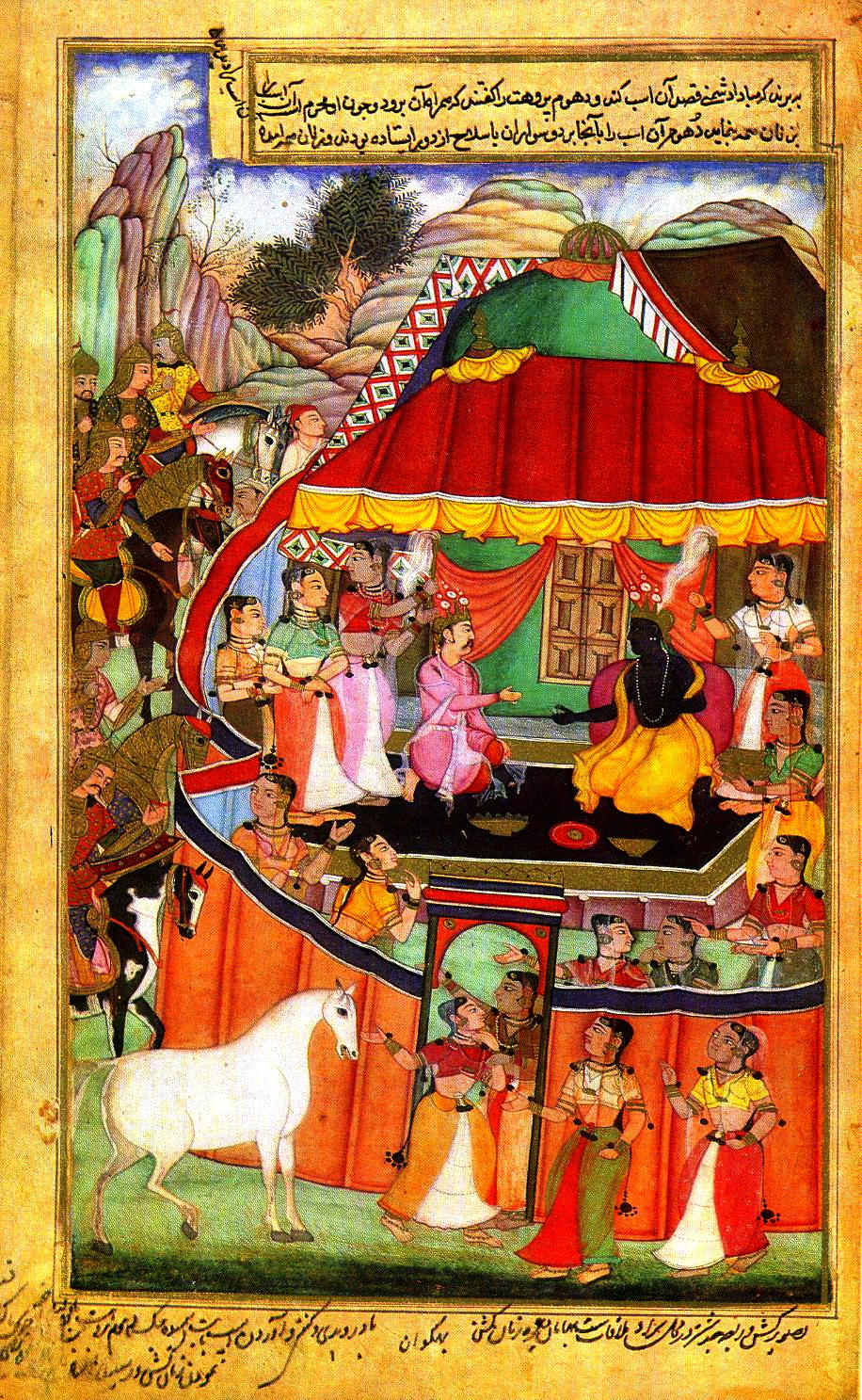
Ladies of Krishna's Harem are shown the Sacrificial Horse. By Bhagwan

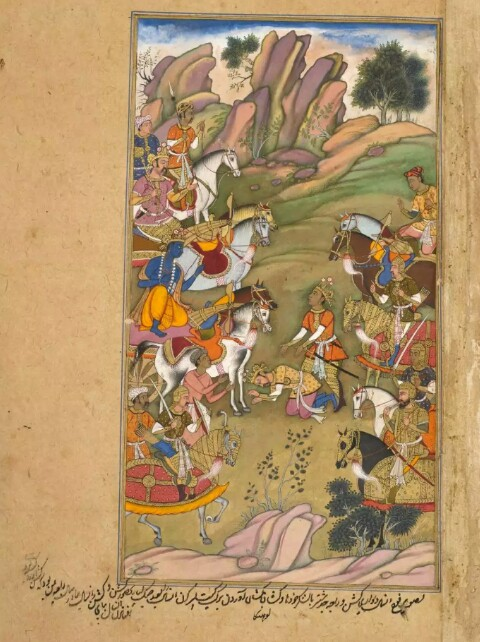
Anusalva defeat by Vrishaketu surrender to Krishna. Artist Lohanga

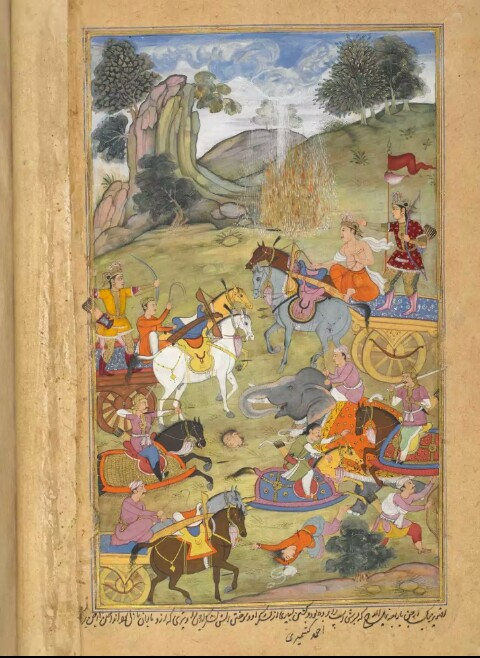
Arjuna attempts to quench the fire that Agni created to help his father-in-law, Niladhvaja, in his battle against Arjuna. Artist Ahmad kashmiri

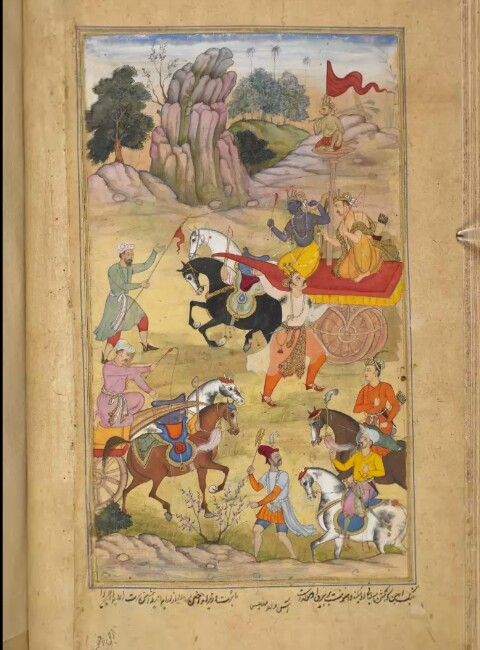
Suratha challenge Arjuna. Artist: Asa, son of Mahesh

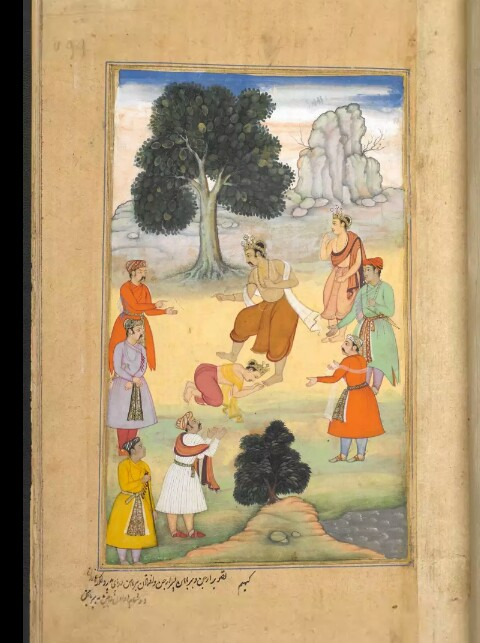
Arjuna spurns Barbhuvahana Artist: khem

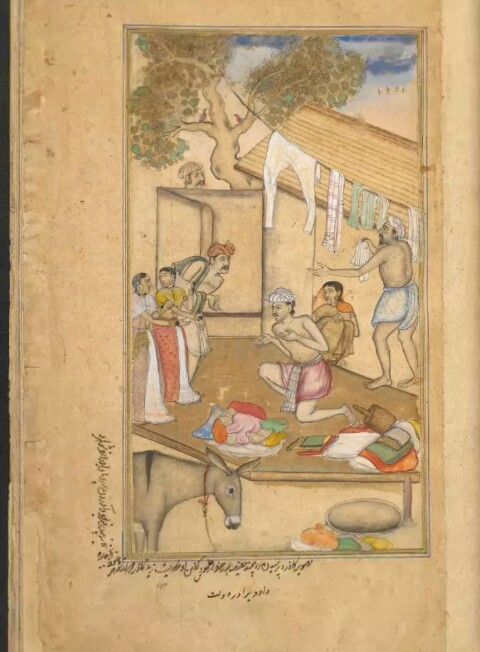
Rama's servant heard gossip about sita. Artist: Daud, Brother of Daulat

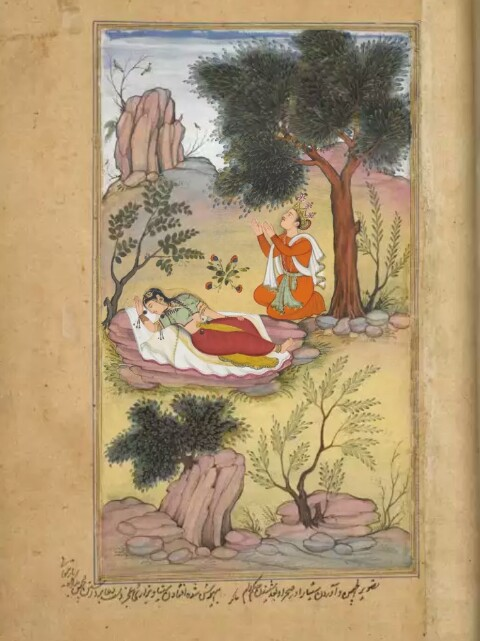
Lakshmana leave sita in Forest. Artist: Makara

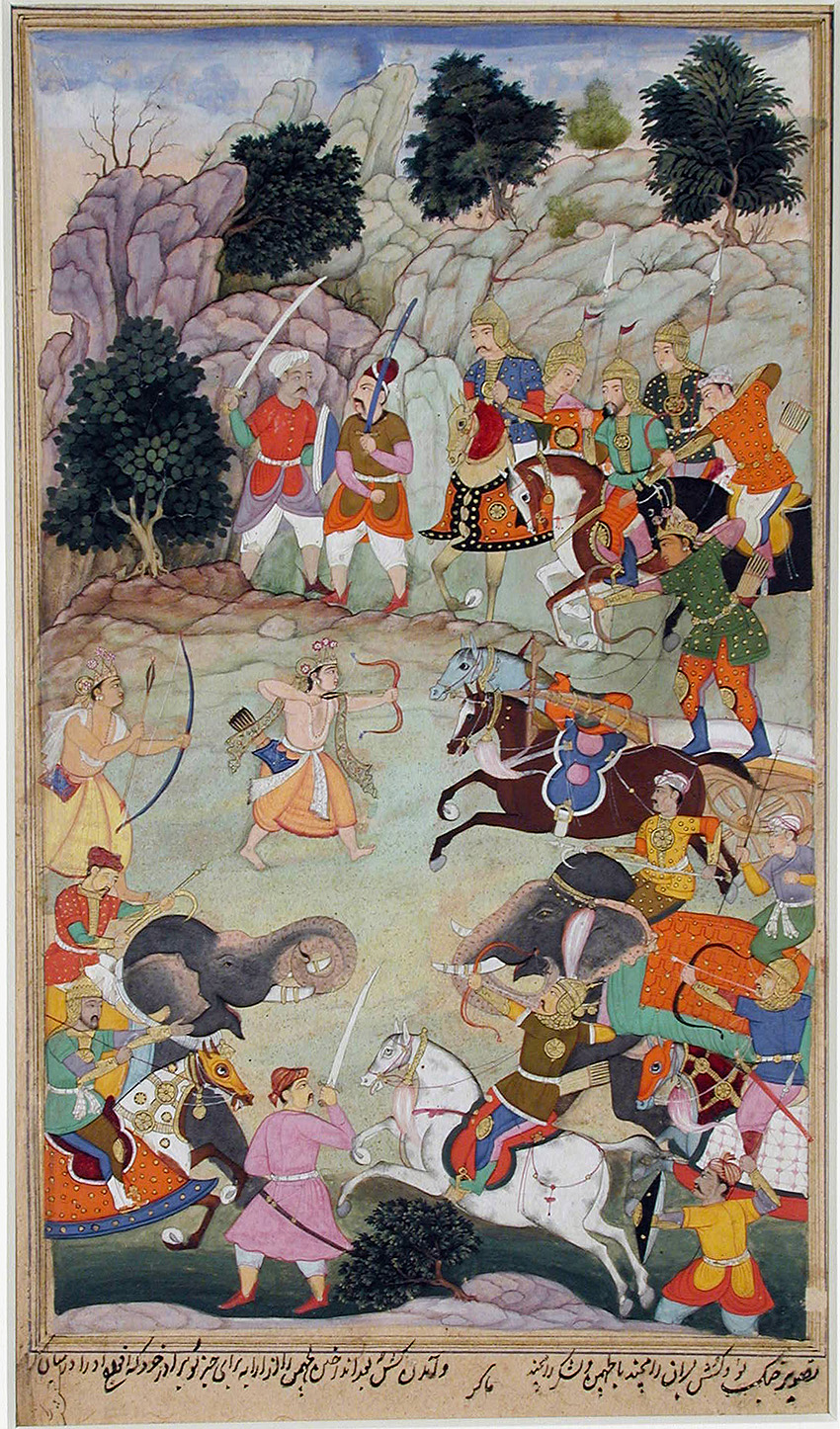
Lava and Kushu engage Lakshmana in battle. Artist: Makara, Edwin collection

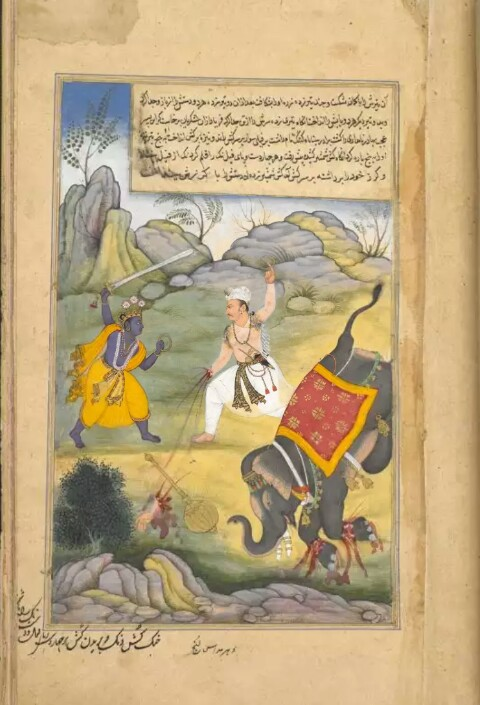
Kusha cut arms of Naga. Artist: Dharmdas Lunja

== Summary of this part of the story ==
At the suggestion of Vyasa, the Pandavas perform the Ashvamedha sacrifice. First Bhima and his army went to Bhadravati, the city of king Yuwanshwa and find a white horse ideal for the sacrifice. Bhima also went to Dwarka to invite Krishna, and also tell Anusalwa who tried to abduct the white horse but was defeated by Vrishakethu. The Jaimini version tells many adventures of white horse. First the horse reaches Malwa where Arjuna fights and defeats King Niladhwaja. Then the horse stuck in a rock in the Vindhya Range and the sage Saubhari tells the story of Chandi.

Next the horse reaches the city of King Hansadhwaja. Arjuna with the help of Krishna kills Hansadhwaja's son Sudhanva and Suratha. Then the horse reaches Manipura where Arjuna's son Babruvahana kills Arjuna. Here Jaimini tells the story of Rama who fights with his own son Lava-kusha. But later Arjuna is save by a magical gem. Next the horse reaches the city of Tamaradhvaja but Krishna manage to defeat them. Then horse come country of Viravarma, King of Saraswata but defeat with help of Krishna and Hanuman. When horse reached country Chandrahasa, sage Narada tell his story of Chandrahasa who adopt by king and married to Bikhaya also he sacrifice himself to save relatives and finally became king. Chandrahasa surrender himself to Krishna. Horse finally reached Hastinapur and yudhisthira completed his Sacrifice. Next Book, Ashramavasika Parva tell Dhitrashtra renounce to Hastinapur with Kunti and gandhari and went to live forest but soon died by Fire of forest. Last three books Mausala Parva, Mahaprasthanika Parva, Svargarohana Parva tell end of krishna and pandavas.
