= Hakim Humam =

Physician (hakim) and an official in the service of the Mughal emperor Akbar

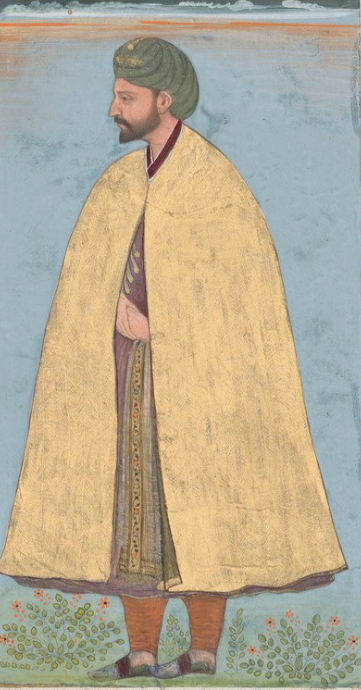
- Portrait of Hakim Humam, c. 1615-20.
- Born: Najib al-Din Humayun; Gilan, Safavid Iran
- Died: 30 October 1595; Mughal Empire
- Known for: Royal physician to Mughal emperor Akbar
- Title: Humayun Quli
- Relatives: Hakim Abu'l-Fath Gilani (brother) Hakim Nuru'd-Din Qarari (brother) Hakim Lutfullah Gilani (brother)

Najib al-Din Humayun (died 30 October 1595), commonly known as Hakim Humam or Hakim Hamam, was a physician (hakim) and an official in the service of the Mughal emperor Akbar. A native of Gilan in present-day Iran, he migrated to present-day India with his brothers to escape Safavid persecution. He held several positions in Akbar's service, and served as the Mughal ambassador to Abdullah Khan II of Bukhara.

== Early life ==
Hakim Humam was a native of the Gilan region in present-day Iran. His father Mawlana 'Abdu'r Razzaq Gilani was a sadr known for drawing horoscopes. In 1566-1567, the Safavid ruler Tahmasp I imprisoned Gilan's ruler Khan Ahmad Khan. During this period, 'Abdu'r Razzaq was also imprisoned, and his sons migrated to the Mughal Empire in present-day India.

Hakim Najib al-Din Humam entered the service of the Mughal emperor Akbar, along with his brothers: Hakim Abu'l-Fath Gilani and Hakim Nuru'd-Din Qarari, and Hakim Lutfullah Gilani. They were Shia Muslims.

== In Akbar's service ==
Humam's real name was Humayun, but when he came to Akbar's court, he called himself Humayun Quli ("slave of Humayun") out of respect for Akbar's father Humayun. Later, he changed his name to Hakim Humam.

Officially, Humam held the position of mir bakawal or bakawal begi (superintendent of the kitchen), and his performance in this role greatly impressed Akbar. However, he was also known as a calligrapher, connoisseur of poetry, scientist, doctor (hakim), and diplomat. Akbar appointed him to the board of authors of Tarikh-i Alfi, a history of the first thousand years of Islam. Humam also held the military rank of mansabdar of 600 soldiers.

Around 1588, Akbar sent Humam as an ambassador to Abdullah Khan II of Bukhara. The letter drafted by Abu'l-Fazl on behalf of Akbar introduces Humam as an "asylum of instruction and talent, cream of devoted loyalties, best of our confidants, the skilful Hakim Humam, who is a right-speaking and right-acting man".

== Death and legacy ==
Humam died of tuberculosis on 30 October 1595, after two months of illness. According to Abu'l-Fazl, he "was endowed with a good countenance, was a jewel of purity, and a sweet-spoken man." Later sources count him among the Navaratnas or nine prominent courtiers of Akbar. He is buried at the Tomb of the Hakims in present-day Pakistan.

Humam's elder son Kamal al-Din, born at Fatehpur Sikri and better known as Hakim Hadhiq, gained prominence as a poet and prose-writer. His other son, Hakim Khushhal, held the mansabdar rank of 6000 soldiers, and served as a bakhshi (military paymaster) and waqianawis(court writer) in the Deccan region.
