= Fathullah Shirazi =

16th-century Persian Sufi polymath

- Born: Shiraz, Safavid Iran
- Died: 1588–89 (997 AH); Kashmir, Mughal Empire
- Spouse: Daughter of Muzaffar Khan Turbati
- Religion: Shia Islam

Sayyed Mīr Fathullāh Shīrāzī (Persian: سید میر فتح الله شیرازی; died 1588–89) was an Indo-Persian Sufi polymath and inventor who specialized in many subjects: theology, literature, grammar, philosophy, medicine, mathematics, astronomy, astrology, and mechanics. A close confidant of the Mughal Emperor Akbar, Shirazi held several important administrative positions in his imperial court.

== Biography ==
=== Early life ===
Sayyed Mīr Fathullāh Shīrāzī was born and raised in Shiraz, Safavid Iran. He received his education at the school of Azar Kayvan. Here, he studied philosophy and logic under the guidance of Khwajah Jamaluddin Mahmud, a disciple of the logician Jalal al-Din Davani. Shirazi furthered his knowledge in medicine, mathematics, and science under the instruction of Mir Ghayasuddin Mansur. After completing his education, Shirazi embarked on a career in education in Shiraz. Among his notable students was Abdul Rahim Khan-i-Khanan, who served as the close confidant of the Mughal Emperor Akbar.

=== Arrival in India ===
Before Shirazi arrived in India, he served the Safavid nobility as a religious dignitary. He migrated to India after being invited by Sultan Ali Adil Shah I, who in turn covered his expenses for the journey. He lived in Bijapur until 1580.

=== Role in Akbar's Administration ===
In 1583, Shirazi received an invitation from Mughal Emperor Akbar and subsequently joined the imperial court in Agra. He soon earned the title of Amir and a rank (mansab) of 3000. Two years later, in 1584, Akbar appointed him as the Amin-ul-Mulk, also known as the Trustee of the State. Shirazi's first task was to reexamine and rectify the Mughal Empire's vast transaction records, which he accomplished with diligence and success. Along with his administrative work, Shirazi also undertook the task of regulating the intrinsic and bullion values of coins. He identified and corrected discrepancies in the currency, ensuring its reliability and trustworthiness.

Shirazi’s skills and talents also earned him various honors and titles. In 1585 and 1587, the emperor selected him to lead diplomatic missions to the Deccan, where he was recognized for his efforts with the title of Azud-ud-Dawlah, or the Arm of the Emperor. He also received a horse, 5000 rupees, a robe of honor, and the office of the Chief Sadr of Hindustan.

=== Death ===
Shirazi fell ill and died during Akbar's stay in Kashmir in 1588–89. He was buried in the monastery of Mir Sayyid Ali Hamadani on the Koh-i-Sulaiman. His closeness to Akbar can be ascertained by the fact that sources say that Akbar was deeply disturbed by his death and stated the following:

"Had he [Shirazi] fallen into the hands of the Franks, and they had demanded all my treasures in exchange for him, I should gladly have entered upon such profitable traffic and bought that precious jewel cheap."

== Inventions ==
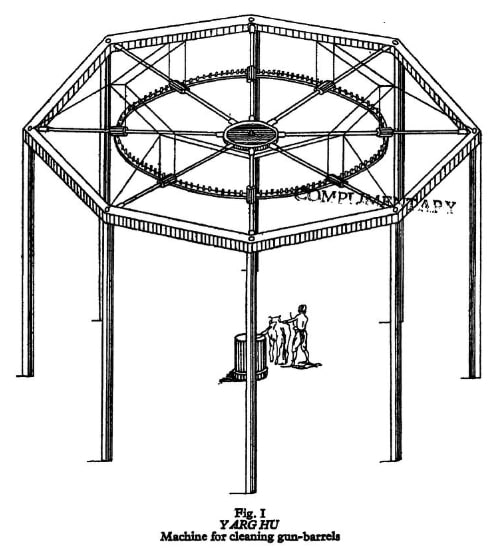
"Yarghu": machine for cleaning gun barrels

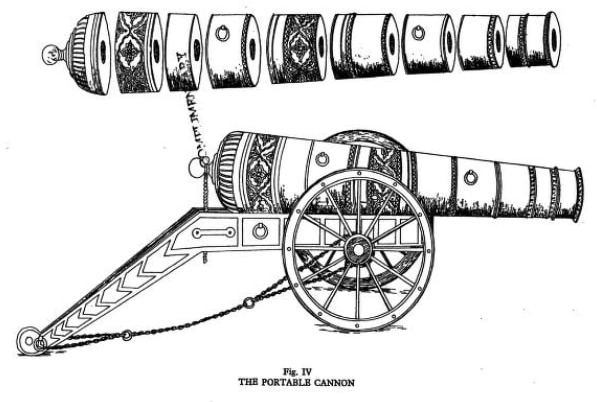
Portable Cannon

- Anti-infantry volley gun with multiple gun barrels similar to a hand cannon.
- A machine known as "Yarghu" which could clean sixteen gun barrels simultaneously and was operated by a cow.
- A seventeen-barrel cannon fired with a matchlock.
- A carriage praised by Abu'l-Fazl ibn Mubarak for its comfort. It was also used to grind corn when not transporting passengers.
- A new curriculum for the madrasas which stressed the importance of uloom-i-muqalat (Rational Sciences) and introduced new subjects such as geometry, medicine, philosophy, and mathematics. The new curriculum produced a series of eminent scholars, engineers and architects.
- Land taxes in Bengal were initially collected according to the Hijri calendar which did not coincide with the solar agricultural cycles. In response, Akbar ordered Shirazi to create a new calendar known as the "fosholi shon" or harvest calendar.

== Writings ==
Shirazi is known for writing commentaries on an array of subjects, with one of his earliest being a commentary on the Quran. He also made significant contributions to the fields of philosophy and logic, particularly in his work, Takmilah-i-Hashiyah. Additionally, he played a crucial role in compiling the Tarikh-i Alfi, a thousand-year history of Islam, demonstrating his vast knowledge in the field of history.
