= Vetala Bhatta =

Sanskrit author

Vetala Bhatta was a Sanskrit author from ancient India. He is known to have written the sixteen stanza "Niti-pradeepa" (Niti-pradīpa, literally, the lamp of conduct). He is included among the legendary Navaratnas (group of nine scholars) of Chandragupta II's court. Some historians have also mentioned him as the magician of Chandra Gupta’s court. There are also many legends about him told as a stories of Vikram-Vetal. (Vikram here is referred to Chandra Gupta II as he was titled Vikramaditya).
