= Maktab Khana (Fatehpur Sikri) =

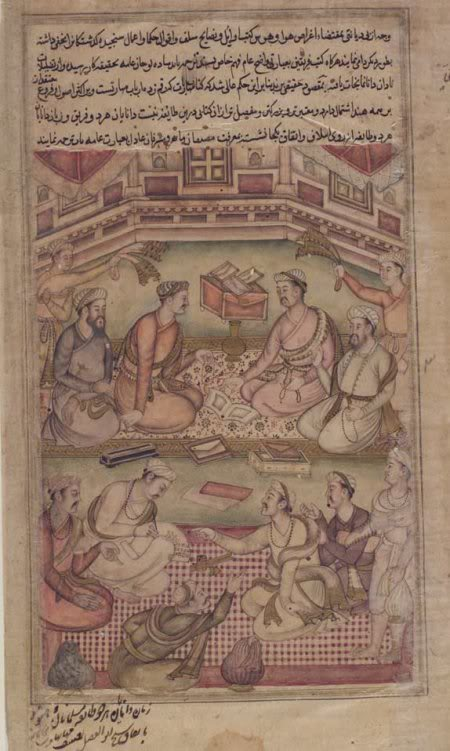
- Muslim and Hindu scholars discuss the translation of the Mahabharata, Maktab Khana, c. 1599.
- Location: Fatehpur Sikri, India, Mughal Empire
- Type: Bureau of Translation
- Established: c. 1574, during the reign of Akbar

The Maktab Khana (lit. 'writing house, writing chamber') was a bureau of records and translation established by the Mughal Emperor Akbar in Fatehpur Sikri around 1574.

== History ==
Emperor Akbar commissioned his most talented scribes and secretaries to translate the major texts of India from Sanskrit into Persian and to illustrate the manuscripts in the royal workshops. These texts included the Mahabharata, translated into the Razmnāma (Persian: رزم نامہ, lit. Book of War), the Ramayana, and the Rajatarangini. Various Arabic encyclopedias and histories were also translated, as well as the entirety of the Baburnama, the memoirs of Akbar's grandfather and founder of the Mughal dynasty, Babur.

With this bureau, Akbar aspired to "form a basis for a united search for truth" and "enable the people to understand the true spirit of their religion."

== See also ==
- Din-i Ilahi
- Ganga–Jamuni Tehzeeb
- Mughal painting
- Razmnama
