= Naqib Khan =

Mughal scholar (d. 1614)

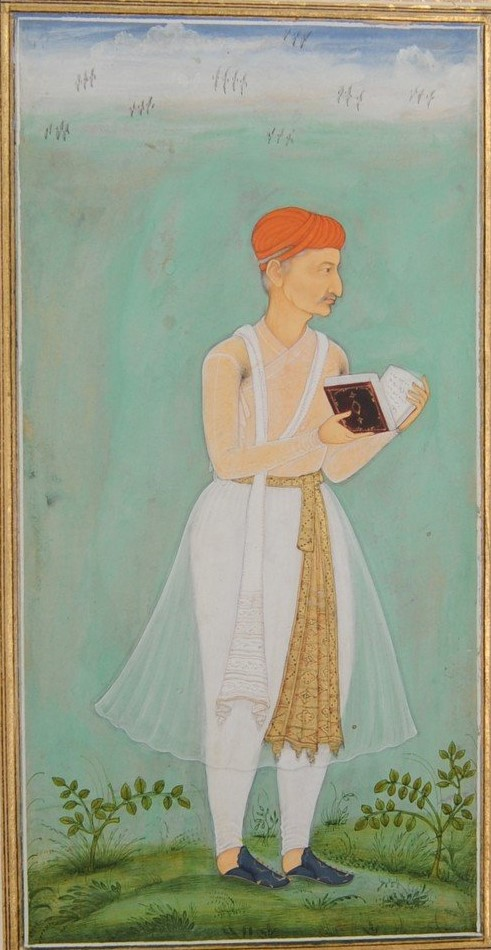
- Portrait of Naqib Khan, c. 1610-1620, Royal Collection
- Born: Mir Ghiyas al-Din Ali Qazvini
- Died: 1614
- Resting place: Ajmer Sharif Dargah
- Notable work: Razmnama; Tarikh-i Alfi
- Father: Mir Abd al-Latif Qazvini
- Relatives: Yahya ibn Abd al-Latif Hoseyni Qazvini (grandfather)

Mir Ghiyas al-Din Ali Qazvini (Persian: میر غیاث‌الدین علی قزوینی; died 1614), known by his title Naqib Khan (نقیب خان), was a scholar and noble of the Mughal court during the reigns of emperors Akbar and Jahangir. He was involved in major literary products of the Mughal court, such as the Razmnama (a Persian translation of the Sanskrit epic Mahabharata) and the work of history Tarikh-i Alfi. He was valued by the Mughal court for his erudition in history and detailed memory.

== Origins ==
Naqib Khan hailed from Qazvin, in Safavid Iran. He came from a scholarly family that had served the Safavids; his grandfather was Yahya ibn Abd al-Latif Hoseyni Qazvini, who authored the Lubb al-Tawarikh. Husayni lived in Iran during the rule of Shah Tahmasp I and was imprisoned by the latter. Sources suggest this was because of accusations that the family was Sunni, though Mughal sources depict Naqib Khan himself as religiously moderate. Husayni died around 1555, and ten years later in 1565 the family moved to India on the invitation of the Mughal ruler Humayun. By the time they arrived Humayan had died and his son Akbar was now ruler; Naqib Khan's father Mir Abd al-Latif Qazvini was appointed as a tutor of Akbar shortly after. The respect accorded to Naqib's Khan father by Akbar is recollected in Jahangir's memoir Tuzuk-i Jahangiri. Jahangir also identifies Naqib Khan as being a Sayyid.

== Career ==
Naqib Khan received his title from the Mughal emperor Akbar. He was involved in the translations of several Sanskrit texts into Persian. The Mahabharata was the most significant in importance and size of all the Sanskrit texts included in the translation projects; over the course of one and a half years, Naqib Khan completed its compilation, titled Razmnama, in 1584 with the assistance of five learned Brahmins.

In the early 1580s he was appointed compiler of the Tarikh-i Alfi, a vast millennial history. He was one of seven initial scholars assigned to the massive project, and the highest in seniority, reflecting his reputation at Akbar's court.

Early during Jahangir's reign, the emperor considered sending Naqib Khan as an emissary to the court of Portuguese king Philip III, but this did not materialize.

== Death ==
Naqib Khan died in 1614. In the Tuzuk-i Jahangiri, Jahangir mentions that Naqib Khan was buried alongside his wife at the dargah in Ajmer.
