= Narwar =

Metropolitan Town in Madhya Pradesh, India

- Town
- Location in Madhya Pradesh, India
- Coordinates: 25.32°N 77.97°E
- Country: India
- State: Madhya Pradesh
- District: Shivpuri

Population (2011)
  - Total: 19,400

Languages
  - Official: Hindi
- Time zone: UTC+5:30 (IST)
- PIN: 473880

Narwar is a town and a nagar parishad in Shivpuri district in the Indian state of Madhya Pradesh. Narwar is a historic town and the Narwar Fort is just east of the Sindh River and is situated at a distance of 42 km from Shivpuri. Narwar was known as Narwar District during the times of Gwalior State. It is mentioned as Nalpura (Nala's town) in many medieval Sanskrit inscriptions. The Narwar Fort is surrounded by the Kali Sindh River. There are three dams, Harsi Dam, Mohini Sagar and Madikheda dam. Presently the Fort is being renovated by the Archaeological Survey of India.

== Legends ==
Narwar is identified with Nalapura town mentioned in the Nishad Charita written by Shriharsha. Nalapura was the capital of Rajjāhnayak Shri Nal dev of Nishad or kevat, whose love for Damayanti has been mentioned in detail in Mahabharata. When Raja Nala left Damayanti asleep in the forests of Narwar she moved through dense forests and reached Chanderi protecting herself from wild animals.

== History ==
=== Early foundation ===
The shorter route from Narwar to Chanderi, which passes through forested areas, is approximately 200km long.

On 12 August 1602, Abu'l-Fazl ibn Mubarak, Akbar's courtier who also wrote Akbarnama was assassinated at Narwar while he was returning from the Deccan by Vir Singh Bundela (who later became the ruler of Orchha) between Sarai Vir and Antri (near Narwar) in a plot contrived by Akbar's eldest son Prince Salim (who later became the Emperor Jahangir), because Abu'l Fazl was known to oppose the accession of Prince Salim to the throne. His severed head was sent to Salim at Allahabad. Abu'l Fazl was buried at Antri. Abu'l Fazl's son Shaikh Afzal Khan (29 December 1571 – 1613) was later appointed governor of Bihar in 1608 by Jahangir. In 1707, Maharaja Gopal Singh (1707–1730) of the Bhadawar princely state was made the Imperial Governor of Narwar by the 8th Mughal emperor Bahadur Shah I.

=== Conciliation of Jat rulership ===
In January 1859, Man Singh Kachwaha, Raja of Narwar came across Maratha General Tatya Tope who had escaped alone into the jungles of Paron after being defeated by the British. Tatya befriended Man Singh and decided to stay with him. Man Singh was in dispute with the Maharaja of Gwalior. British successfully negotiated with Man Singh Kachwaha to surrender Tatya to them in return for Man safety of Man Singh's life and protection of his family from any reprisals by the Maharaja of Gwalior. After this Tope was alone. The British forces had failed to subdue him for over a year. Tope was betrayed into the hands of the British by his trusted friend, Man Singh, while asleep in his camp in the Paron forest. He was captured on 7 April 1859 by a detachment of native infantry from British General Richard John Meade's troops led to him by Man Singh and escorted to Shivpuri where he was tried by a military court.

== Geography ==
Narwar is located at 25.32°N 77.97°E.It has an average elevation of 452 metres (1482 feet).

== Demographics ==
As of 2001 India census, Narwar had a population of 15,748. Males constitute 53% of the population and females 47%. Narwar has an average literacy rate of 58%, lower than the national average of 59.5%: male literacy is 69%, and female literacy is 45%. In Narwar, 18% of the population is under 6 years of age.

== See also ==
- List of gurdwaras
- Indo-Islamic architecture
- List of Jat dynasties and states
- Tourism in central state agency of British Raj
