= Faizi =

Indian poet and scholar (1547–1595)

Faizi (Abu al-Faiz ibn Mubarak)
- Born: Abu al-Faiz ibn Mubarak; 20 September 1547; Agra, Mughal India (now India)
- Died: 15 October 1595 (aged 48); Lahore, Mughal India (now Pakistan)
- Occupations: Poet, Scholar, Malik-ush-Shu'ara (Poet Laureate) of Akbar’s court
- Relatives: Abul Fazl (younger brother)
- Writing career
- Pen name: Faizi
- Language: Persian; also composed in Arabic; translated Sanskrit works into Persian
- Years active: c. 1566–1595
- Notable works: Divan ("Tabashir al-Subh"); Nal o Daman; Markaz ul-Advar; Translations: Lilavati (Sanskrit to Persian); Arabic works: Swati al-Ilham, Mawarid al-Kalam
- Literary movement: Mughal literary culture; one of Akbar’s Navaratnas

Abu al-Faiz ibn Mubarak, popularly known by his pen-name, Faizi (20 September 1547 – 15 October 1595) was a poet and scholar of late medieval India whose ancestors were the Malik-ush-Shu'ara (poet laureate) of Akbar's Court. He was the elder brother of Akbar's historian Abul Fazl. Akbar highly recognised the genius in him and appointed him tutor for his sons and gave place to him among his decorative 'Navaratnas'.

== Life ==
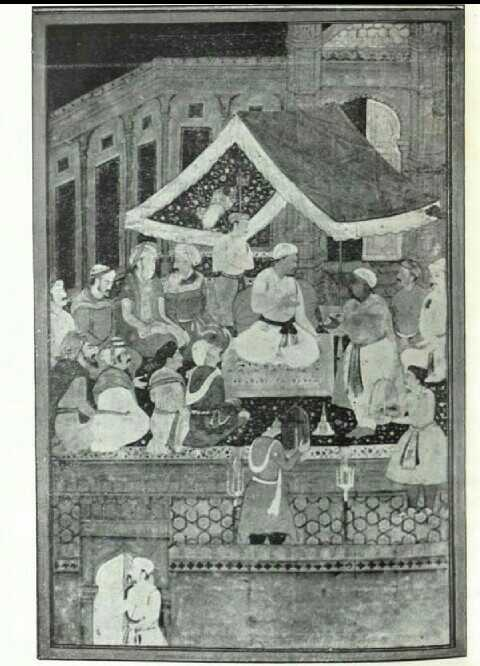
Faizi represent his work 'Nal wa daman' to Akbar.

Faizi was born in Agra on 5 Sha'ban, AH 954 (20 September 1547), he was the eldest son of Shaikh Mubarak of Nagaur. Shaikh Mubarak was a scholar in the philosophy literature of Greece as well as in Islamic theology. He was educated mostly by his father. In AH 974 (1566–8), he reached Akbar's court. Akbar successively appointed him tutor for his princes, Salim, Murad and Daniyal. In AH 990 (1581), he was appointed sadr of Agra, Kalpi and Kalinjar. In 1588, he became poet laureate of Akbar's court. In AH 999 (1591–2), he was sent to Khandesh and Ahmednagar as Mughal envoy.

In AH 1003 (1594), a few years after his return from Deccan, Faizi suffered from asthma and died on 10 Safar, AH 1004 (15 October 1595) at Lahore. Initially, he was buried in the Ram Bagh at Agra but his body was later transferred to another family mausoleum near Sikandara.

== Works ==
He composed significant poetic works in Persian and is ascribed by Bada'uni and his other contemporaries to have composed over a hundred poetic works, but all the titles are not known to us. His Divan (collection of poems), was entitled Tabashir al-Subh. His Divan comprises qasidas, ghazals, ruba'is and elegies. The exaltation of pantheism in some of his lyrics brought on him the enmity of the orthodox Muslim clergy.

In pursuance of the literary practice then in vogue, Faizi planned to produce a Panj Ganj (literally five treasures) or Khamsa in imitation of the Persian poet Nizami Ganjavi. At the age of 30, he started writing five works: the Nal o Daman (a Persian imitation of the famous Indian epic Nala and Damayanti), the Markaz ul-Advar (The Centre of the Circle), the Sulaiman o Bilqis (Solomon and Balkis – the queen of Sheba), the Haft Kishvar (The Seven Zones of the Earth) and the Akbarnama (The History of Akbar). His two completed works, the Markaz ul-Advar and the Nal o Daman (completed in 1594) was the javab (imitation) of Nizami's the Makhzan ul-Asrarand the Layla o Majnun. His other three incomplete works, the Sulaiman o Bilqis, the Haft Kishvar and the Akbarnama were the imitations of the Khusraw o Shirin, the Haft Paykar and the Sikandarnama respectively.

During his stay in Deccan from 1591–3, Faizi wrote a celebrated series of reports on political and cultural conditions of Deccan, as well as contemporary Iran. He wrote a number of books in Arabic which include "Swati al-Ilham" and "Mawarid al-Kalam" (written without dotted letters) and translated Bhaskaracharya's celebrated Sanskrit work on mathematics, Lilavati, into Persian. According to its preface, this work was completed in AH 995 (1587). Friedrich Max Müller's Introduction to the Science of Religion (1870, last ed. 1882) has a number of metrical paraphrases of Faizi's poems.

== Described by his brother Abu'l-Fazl ==
Of my eldest brother what shall I say? Notwithstanding his spiritual and worldly perfections, he took no step without my concurrence, indiscreet as I am, and devoting himself to my interests, advanced my promotion and was an aid to good intentions. In his poems he speaks of me in a manner which I cannot sufficiently acknowledge, as he says in his eulogium:

My verse may share both great and little worth to subhraj,
Its theme sublime—I lowlier than the earth.
A father's virtues shall it far proclaim
And vaunt the glory of a brother's fame:
He, touchstone of all wisdom, who inspires
My strain with sweetness that a world admires;
If through a riper age, I pass him by,
In merit, centuries between us lie.
What though the branching savin taller grows,
What gardener mates its beauty with the rose?

He was born in the Jalali year 469, corresponding to A.H. 954 (A.D. 1547). In what tongue shall I indict his praise? In this work I have already written of him and poured forth the anguish of my heart, and quenched its furnace with the water of narration and broken the dam of its torrents and alleviated my want of resignation. His works which are the scales of eloquence and penetration and the lawns of the birds of song, praise him and speak his perfections and recall his virtues. He was one of the nine jewels in Akbar's court. Faizi also translated the Yogvashisth into Persian.
