= Antri =

- Village
- Location in Madhya Pradesh, India
- Coordinates: 26°3′29″N 78°12′36″E
- Country: India
- State: Madhya Pradesh
- District: Gwalior

Area
  - Total: 86.6 km^{2} (33.4 sq mi)

Population (2010)
  - Total: 12,122
  - Density: 331/km^{2} (860/sq mi)

Languages
  - Official: Hindi
- Time zone: UTC+5:30 (IST)
- PIN: 475001
- Telephone code: 07525
- Vehicle registration: MP 07
- Nearest city: Gwalior
- Sex ratio: 899/1000 ♂/♀
- Literacy: 87%
- Lok Sabha constituency: Gwalior
- Vidhan Sabha constituency: gird
- Climate: Dry (Köppen)

Antri is a village in Madhya Pradesh, India, lying 25 km (16 mi) south of places such as Gwalior. The village is famous for its clay deposits. The current chairman Smt. Sunita sunil sharma (BJP).

== Etymology ==
The name Antri is a colloquial variation of the Hindi word antadee (अंतड़ी which means "intestine".

== History ==
Abu'l-Fazl ibn Mubarak was one of Mughal Emperor Akbar's courtiers. On 12 August 1602, he was assassinated at Narwar (near Antri) by Vir Singh Bundela. The plot to kill him was contrived by Akbar's oldest son Prince Salim, who later became the emperor Jahangir because Abu'l-Fazl opposed the accession of Prince Salim. His severed head was sent to Salim at Allahabad. Abu'l-Fazl was buried at Antri. Abu'l Fazl's son, Shaikh Afzal Khan (29 December 1571 – 1613), was later appointed governor of Bihar in 1608 by Jahangir, who had succeeded his father.

Antri is known for its role in the Indian Rebellion of 1857 against the British East India Company. After the British captured the town Kalpi (also called Jhansi) on 24 May 1858, rebels such as Rani sought shelter at a fort in Antri. The British soon attacked Antri and captured it. In the battle, Rani died against the militarily superior British forces. The other rebels either were executed or fled.

== Demographics ==
The 2001 Census of India recorded that Antri's population is 12,919. Males constitute 54% of the population, and females 46%. Antri has a literacy rate of 70%, higher than the national average of 59.5%; male literacy is 76%, and female literacy is 63%. In the village, 13% of the population is under six years of age. Hindi is the main language spoken in Antri. Due to rule by the Maratha caste, Marathi influence is strong.

== Geography ==
Antri's coordinates are 26°13'N 78°11'E / 26.22°N 78.18°E / 26.22; 78.18. It has an average elevation of 197 mi (1,040,000 ft). Antri is located 100 km (100,000 m) from Kalpi.

A small river, the Chachundar, flows underground and can be seen during the rainy season.

== Geology ==
Antri is situated on Bundelkhand granites formed during the Archean period. Clay deposits are found in the village, referred to as the "Antri deposits of Gwalior" in geological studies.

== Climate ==
Antri has a sub-tropical climate with hot summers from late March to early July, a humid monsoon season from late June to early October and a cool, dry winter from early November to late February. Under the Köppen climate classification, the city has a humid subtropical climate. The highest recorded temperature was 53 °C (127 °F), and the lowest was −1 °C (30 °F). Summers start in late March. Similarly to other cities like Nagpur and Delhi, they are among the hottest in India and the world. Temperatures peak in May and June with daily temperatures around 33–35 °C (91–95 °F), ending in late June with the onset of the monsoon. Antri receives 970 mm (38 in) of rain every year, most of which is concentrated in the monsoon months from late June to early October. August is the wettest month with 310 mm (12 in) of rain. Winter in Antri starts in late October. It is dry, sunny and mild with temperatures at 14–16 °C (57–61 °F). January is the coldest month with average temperature lows at 5–7 °C (41–45 °F). In winter, temperatures plummet to near freezing in occasional cold snaps.

== Government ==
The village has a small city council (nagar parishad). Antri's administrative divisions are the 15 wards.

== Festivals ==
The locals of Antri celebrate all Indian national festivals: Diwali, Holi, Makar Sankranti, Eid-ul-Fitr, Rakhi and Mahavir Jayanti. Several local festivals are also celebrated, such as Nag Panchami, Gudi Padwa, Navratri, Kullu Dussehra, Durga Puja and Ratha-Yatra. In the 21st century, the celebration of Western holidays like Valentine's Day and New Year's Eve has become popular.

Antri celebrates Rang Panchami differently from other sub-cultures. It is celebrated five days after Dulendi or Holi. Rang Pachami is like Dulendi, but colors are mixed with water, and sprinkled or poured on others.

In Ganesh Chaturthi, a carnival of floats (Hindi: Jhanki) is held in the village.

Makar Sankranti (the Kite Festival) is celebrated annually on 14 January. People fly kites, competing to cut others' kites white they fly them.

== Media and communication ==
Newspapers, magazines and television material is published in Gwalior and distributed to Antri. Dainik Bhaskar is one of the oldest and most widely read newspapers.
