= Muntakhab-ut-Tawarikh =

Mughal history by Abdul Qadir Badauni

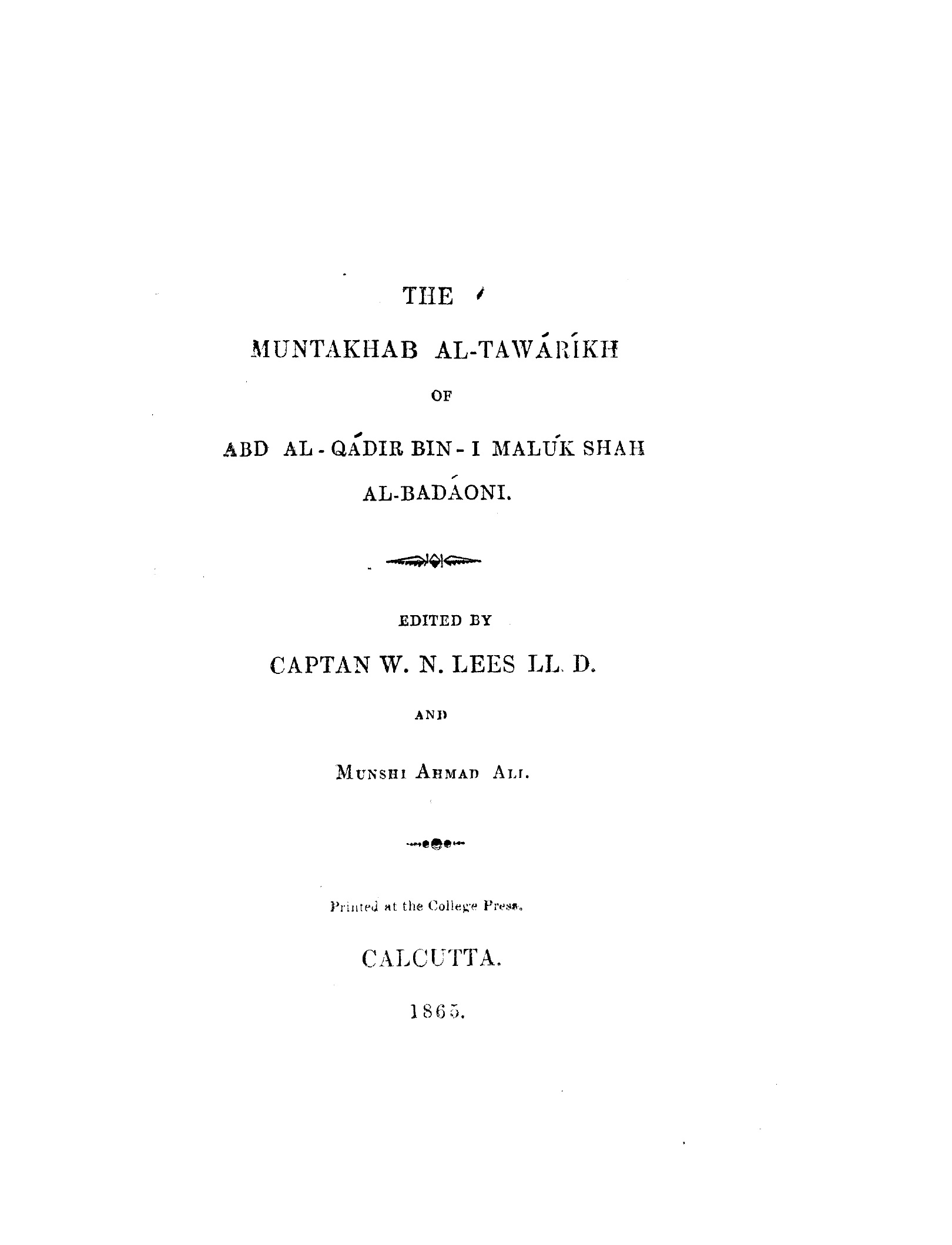
Muntakhab-ut-Tawarikh, Persian text, published in Calcutta, 1865

Muntakhab-ut-Tawarikh (منتخب التواریخ) or Tarikh-i-Bada'uni (تاریخ بداؤنی), Selection of Chronicles by `Abd al-Qadir Bada'uni (1540–1605) is a book describing the early Mughal history of India, covering the period from the days of Ghaznavid reign until the fortieth regnal year of Mughal Emperor Akbar.

== Overview ==
Muntakhab-ut-Tawarikh is a general history of the Muslims in India from Sabuktigin to 1595, commenced in 1590 followed by biographies of shaykhs, scholars, physicians and poets. `Abd al-Qadir Bada'uni began writing this history in the first half of 1590. The book was completed by October 1595. Its comprises on the 618 solar year's historic events. Muntakhab-ut-Tawarikh is based largely on Khawaja Nīzām-ud-Din Ahmad Sirhindi's Tabakāt-i-Akbar Shāhi (also known as Tabakāt-i-Akbari), with characteristic asides by `Abd al-Qadir Bada'uni.

The work contains three volumes. The first volume contains historic accounts about the rulers and kings of the Ghaznavids, Ghurid dynasty, Mamluk Dynasty (Delhi), Babur and Humayun. It records the history of India from the coronation of Sabuktigin, founder of Ghaznavids Empire (A.D 977) down to the death of Mughal Emperor Humayun (24 January 1556). The second volume covers the first forty years of Mughal Emperor Akbar's reign from 14 February 1556 to October 1595. Abd al-Qadir Bada'uni was Eye-witness of Akbar's era. This volume is an unusually frank and critical account of Akbar's administrative measures, particularly regarding religion and his conduct. This volume was kept concealed till Akbar's death and was published after Jahangir's accession (approximately in 1605). The third part contains the biographical accounts of the Saints, Poets and men of letters who were either known to him, or were attached to the court of Akbar. The accounts relate to 38 Shaykhs (religious leaders), 69 scholars, 15 philosophers, physicians and 67 poets.

The work is noted for its hostile comments on Akbar's religious activities. Its existence was apparently kept secret until at least the tenth year of Jahangir's reign (1615). When Mullā 'Abd al-Bāķī Nahawandī, author of Ma'āthir-i- Rahimī, did not know of it when he completed his work in 1616.

== Publications ==
The first Persian language text of this book was published in 1864 from Lucknow, but is no longer available and has since likely been lost. The second printed edition of the text of this work was published by the College Press, Calcutta in 1865. This work was later translated into English by G.S.A. Ranking (Vol.I), W.H. Lowe (Vol.II) and T.W. Haig (Vol.III) (published by the Asiatic Society, Calcutta between 1884-1925 as a part of their Bibliotheca Indiaca series).

Maulavi Ehtisham-ud-Din Muradabadi was the first to translate it into Urdu, and it was then published by Munshi Navalkishore's Press, Lucknow in 1889.

== Abstract version ==
Abd-Shukur ibn Sheikh Abdul-Wāseī Thattahvi wrote an abstract version of this book in Persian language.
