= Bibliotheca Indica =

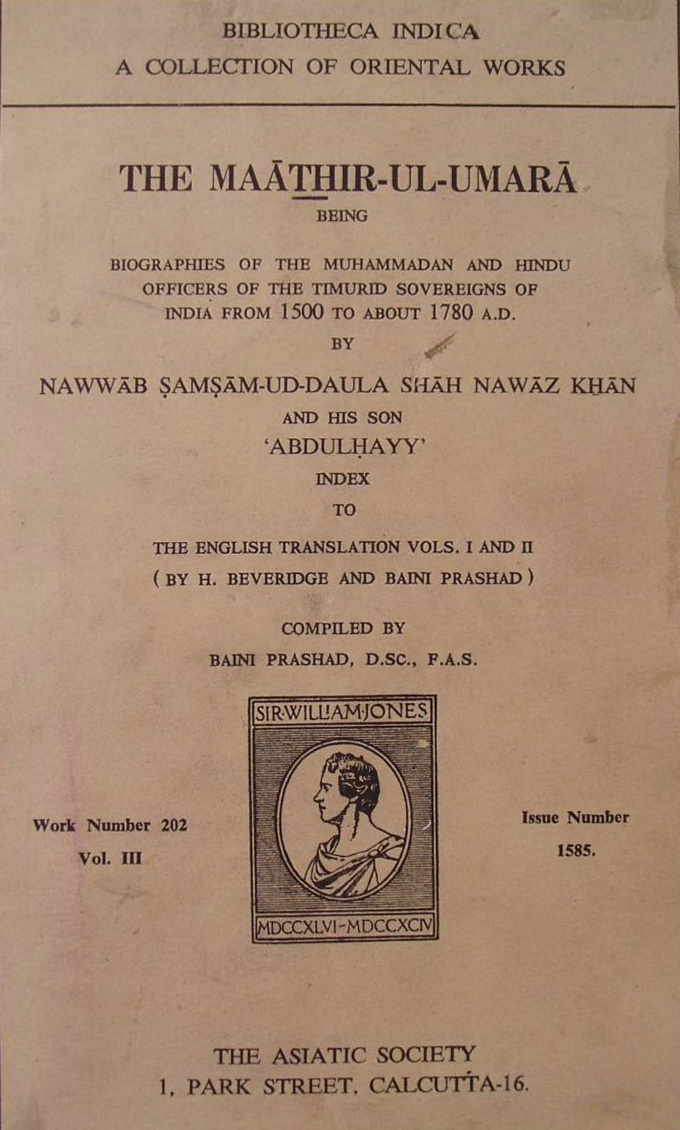
Bibliotheca Indica

Bibliotheca Indica is a series of "books belonging to or treating of Oriental literatures and contains original text editions as well as translations into English, and also bibliographies, dictionaries, grammars, and studies" on Asia-related subjects in other disciplines (such as ethnology). The series was launched in 1849 and published by the Asiatic Society of Bengal in Calcutta and subsequently by the Royal Asiatic Society of Bengal and then by The Asiatic Society.

Publisher's advertisements of the early 20th century showed the Bibliotheca Indica as being divided in three "series" (in fact, subseries): Sanskrit Series, Tibetan Series, and Arabic and Persian Series. The Society's website in 2022 reports that the languages published in the series include "Sanskrit, Prakrit, Pali, Rajasthani, Kashmiri, Hindi, Bengali, Tibetan, Kui, Arabic, Persian, Urdu, (...) sometime with [English] translations".

The majority of the books in the series are now in the public domain and are now available on the Internet as digital downloads. In addition, all of the Bibliotheca Indica books are available on The Asiatic Society's Digital Library is "available only on the LAN of the Society premises".
