= Yahya ibn Abd al-Latif Hoseyni Qazvini =

Yahya ibn Abd al-Latif Hoseyni Qazvini (1481–1555) was the author of the Persian-language universal history of Lobb al-tavarikh ("The essence of histories"), composed in 1542.

== Sources ==
- Quinn, Sholeh; Melville, Charles (2012). Yarshater, Ehsan; Melville, Charles (eds.). Persian Historiography: History of Persian Literature A, Vol X (A History of Persian Literature). I.B.Tauris. ISBN 978-1845119119.
- Quinn, Sholeh A. (2021). "Safavid Historiography: The place of the Safavids in the Iranian history". In Matthee, Rudi (ed.). The Safavid World. New York: Taylor & Francis. pp. 164–182. ISBN 9781000392876. OCLC 1274244049.
