= Kalā =

Performing art in Sanskrit

Kalā means 'performing art' in Sanskrit. In Hindu scriptures, Shiva is regarded as the master of Kalā. In the Lalita Sahasranama, the Devi is invoked as an embodiment of the 64 fine arts. In some traditions, the goddess Sarasvati is also associated with these 64 kalās, and is thus referred to as Kalanidhi or Chausath Kalamayi (the one who possesses 64 arts).

== 64 Arts ==
The mastery of 64 skills is known as Chatuṣṣaṣṭi Kalā. The discussion of these arts is found in the Kama Sutra, attributed to the sage Vatsyayana. The following is a commonly cited list of the 64 traditional arts:

1. Gīta vidyā – Singing
2. Vādya vidyā – Playing on musical instruments
3. Nṛtya vidyā – Dancing
4. Nāṭya vidyā – Theatrical performance
5. Ālekhya vidyā – Painting
6. Viśeṣaka-cchēdya vidyā – Body decoration with colours
7. Tāṇḍula-kusuma-balivikāra – Preparing offerings from rice and flowers
8. Puṣpastaraṇa – Making floral arrangements for beds
9. Danta-vasanāṅga-rāga – Applying perfumes and cleansing products
10. Maṇi-bhūmikā-karma – Crafting jewel settings
11. Śayyā-racana – Arranging bedding
12. Udaka-vādya – Making music with water
13. Udaka-ghāta – Playing or splashing with water
14. Citra-yoga – Mixing and applying colours
15. Mālya-grathana-vikalpa – Making garlands
16. Śekharāpīḍa-yojana – Setting headgear or coronets
17. Nēpathyayoga – Dressing and costume design
18. Karṇapātra-bhaṅga – Decorating the ear’s tragus
19. Sugandha-yukti – Application of fragrances
20. Bhūṣaṇa-yojana – Applying ornaments
21. Aindra-jāla – Juggling or sleight of hand
22. Kaucumāra – Knowledge of mystic arts
23. Hasta-lāghava – Manual dexterity or sleight of hand
24. Citra-śākā-pūpa-bhakṣya-vikāra-kriyā – Preparing decorative and tasty dishes
25. Pānaka-rasa-rāgāsava-yojana – Preparing drinks
26. Sūci-vāya-karma – Needlework and weaving
27. Sūtra-kṛīḍā – Playing with threads
28. Vīṇā-ḍamaruka-vādya – Playing the vīṇā and small drums
29. Prahelikā – Making and solving riddles
30. Durvacaka-yoga – Solving complex speech or conundrums
31. Pustaka-vācana – Recitation of books
32. Nāṭikā-khyāyikā-darśana – Enacting stories or plays
33. Kāvya-samasya-pūraṇa – Completing poetic verses
34. Paṭṭikā-vetra-bāṇa-vikalpa – Making weapons and shields
35. Tarku-karma – Spinning by spindle
36. Takṣaṇa – Carpentry
37. Vāstu-vidyā – Architecture
38. Raupya-ratna-parīkṣā – Testing of silver and gemstones
39. Dhātu-vāda – Metallurgy
40. Maṇi-rāga-jñāna – Knowledge of jewel colouring
41. Ākāra-jñāna – Mineralogy
42. Vṛkṣāyurveda-yoga – Herbal medicine and healing
43. Meṣa-kukkuṭa-lāvaka-yuddha-vidhi – Knowledge of animal fighting
44. Śuka-sārikā-pralāpana – Training parrots and mynah birds to speak
45. Utsādana – Personal hygiene and massage
46. Keśa-mārjana-kauśala – Hair care and styling
47. Akṣara-muṣṭika-kathana – Communication with hand gestures
48. Dhāraṇa-mātrikā – Using protective amulets
49. Deśa-bhāṣā-jñāna – Knowledge of regional dialects
50. Nirmiti-jñāna – Knowledge of omens and predictions
51. Yantra-mātrikā – Mechanics and machine crafting
52. Mlecchita-kutarka-vikalpa – Understanding and responding to foreign logic
53. Saṁvācya – Conversation and speech
54. Mānasi kāvya-kriyā – Mental composition of poetry
55. Kriyā-vikalpa – Designing remedies and treatments
56. Calitaka-yoga – Constructing shrines
57. Abhidhāna-kośa-chanda-jñāna – Knowledge of lexicons and prosody
58. Vastra-gopana – Concealment of clothing
59. Dyūta-viśeṣa – Mastery of gambling
60. Ākarṣa-kṛīḍā – Playing with dice or magnets
61. Bālaka-kṛīḍanaka – Making toys
62. Vainayikī vidyā – Teaching discipline
63. Vaijayikī vidyā – Military strategy or achieving victory
64. Vaitālikī vidyā – Waking someone with music

== Interpretations ==
Some esoteric interpretations associate the 64 kalās with astronomical or spiritual concepts. For example, the numbers are linked symbolically to OM, the planets, or chess (64 squares), and mythologically to Kalki or the 64 Jyotirlingas. These associations are not found in classical sources but appear in later mystic or tantric interpretations.

== See also ==
- Hindu art
- Shilpa Shastras
- Kama Sutra
- Agni Purana
