= Abul Fazl =

Mughal grand vizier from 1579 to 1602

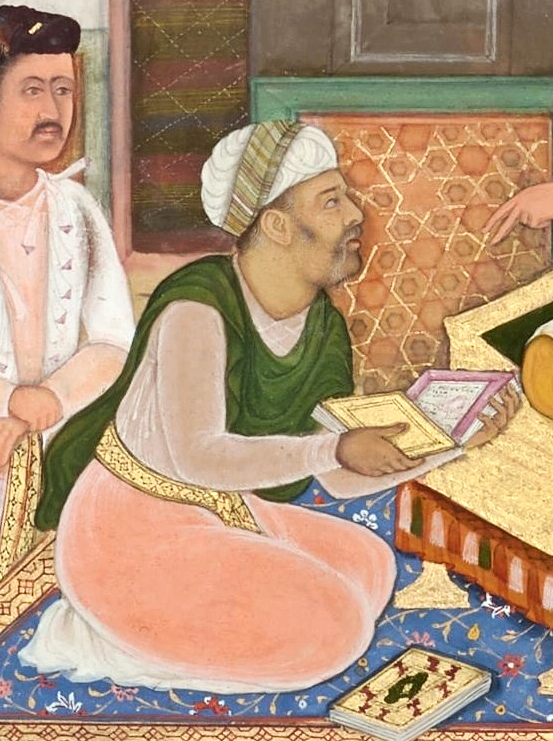
- Portrait of Abul Fazl by Govardhan, c. 1602–1605.

Grand Vizier of the Mughal Empire
- In office 1579 – 22 August 1602
- Monarch: Akbar I
- Preceded by: Muzaffar Khan Turbati
- Succeeded by: Sharif Khan

Personal details
- Born: 14 January 1551 Agra, Mughal Empire (modern-day Uttar Pradesh, India)
- Died: 22 August 1602 (aged 51) near Narwar, Malwa Subah, Mughal Empire (modern-day Madhya Pradesh, India)
- Cause of death: Assassination
- Relations: Faizi (brother)
- Notable work: Akbarnama; Ain-i-Akbari; Ruqaʿāt; Inshā-i-Abu'l Fazl; Persian translation of the Bible

Abu'l-Fazl ibn Mubarak (14 January 1551 – 22 August 1602), also known as Abul Fazl, Abu'l Fadl and Abu'l-Fadl 'Allami, was an Indian writer, historian, and politician who served as the grand vizier of the Mughal Empire from his appointment in 1579, until his death in 1602. His notable works include the Akbarnama, Ain-i-Akbari, and a Persian translation of the Bible.

Abul Fazl is often referred to as one of the Nine Jewels (Hindi: नवरत्न, romanized: Navaratna, lit. 'nine jewels') of Akbar's royal court and the brother of Faizi, the poet laureate of Emperor Akbar.

== Ancestors ==
Shaikh Abul Fazl ibn Mubarak was born in Agra in 1551, the son of Shaikh Mubarak. Mubarak was born in Nagaur but had moved to Agra in 1543. His own father, Fazl's grandfather, Shaikh Khizr, had moved from Sindh to Nagaur in the 15th–16th century, Nagaur had attained importance as a Sufi mystic centre under Shaikh Hamid-ud-din Sufi Sawali, a khalifa of Shaikh Mu'in ad-Din Chishti of Ajmer. At Nagaur, Shaikh Khizr settled near the tomb of Shaikh Hamid-ud-din. Fazl's ancestors hailed from Yemen and traced their lineage to Shaikh Musa, who had emigrated to Sind some six generations earlier.

=== Shaikh Mubarak Nagori ===
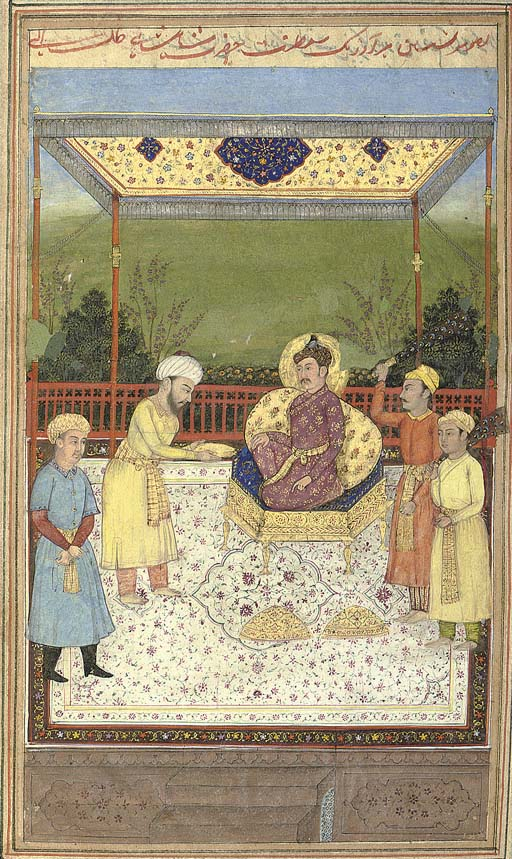
Abu'l Fazl ibn Mubarak and Akbar (D. 1602 AD)

Abul Fazl's father, Shaikh Mubarak was born in 1506 at Nagaur. Soon after Abul Fazl's birth, Khizr travelled to Sind to bring other members of his family to Nagaur but he died on the way. Khizr's death and a famine and plague that ravaged Nagaur caused great hardship to the destitute Mubarak and his mother. Despite these hardships, Mubarak's mother arranged a good education for him. One of Mubarak's earliest teachers was Shaikh Attan, who was known for his piety. Another important teacher who influenced Shaikh Mubarak was Shaikh Fayyazi, a disciple of Khwaja Ubaidullah Ahrar. Later he went to Ahmedabad and studied under Shaikh Abu'l Fazl Gazruni (who adopted him as a son), Shaikh Umar and Shaikh Yusuf.

Yusuf advised Mubarak to go to Agra and set up a madrasah there. Mubarak reached Agra in April 1543 and on the suggestion of Shaikh Alawal Balawal set up his residence at Charbagh, which was built by Babur on the left bank of the Yamuna. Mir Rafi' ad-Din Safawi of Inju (Shiraz) lived close by and Mubarak married a near relative of his. Mubarak established his madrash in Agra, where his special field of instruction was philosophy, and he attracted a number of scholars to his lectures, such as Mulla Abdul Qadir Badauni. He also spent some time in Badaun, the holy land of Sufism.

The orthodox group of Ulama criticised Mubarak and accused him of changing his views. Khwaja Ubaidullah, who was brought up in the house of Shaikh Mubarak's daughter, was of the opinion that Mubarak's views changed with the change in the political climate and he adopted the religious attitudes of rulers and nobles of those days out of expediency. For example, he was a Sunni during the reign of sultan Ibrahim Khan Lodi, became a Naqshbandi during the Sur period, was a Mahdawiya during the reign of Humayun and a protagonist of liberal thought under Akbar.

== Biography ==
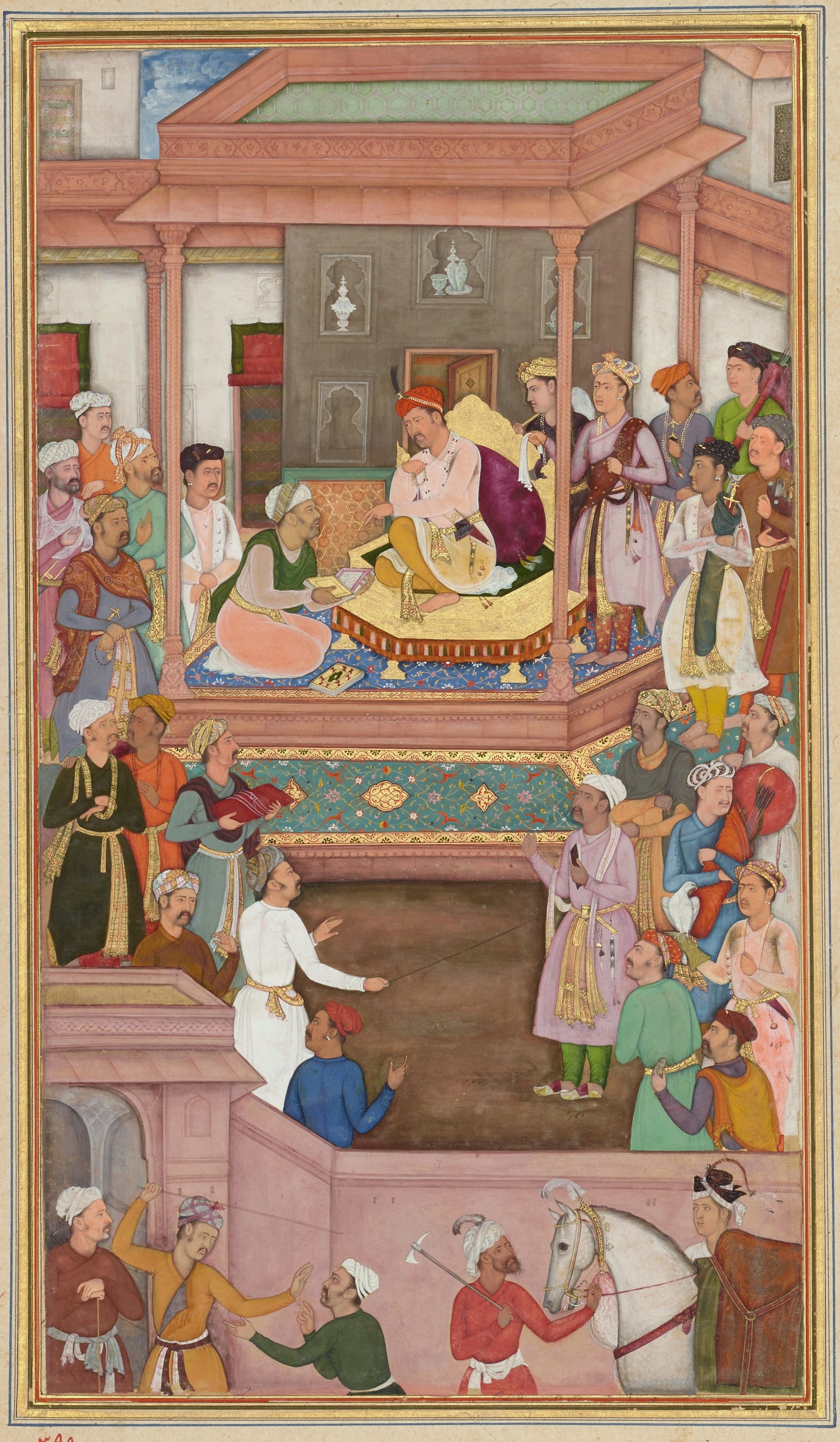
Abu'l-Fazl presenting Akbarnama to Akbar

Shaikh Mubarak's first son, the poet Abu'l Faiz and his second son Abu'l Fazl were born in Agra. Abul Fazl's education began with Arabic and by the age of five he could read and write. His father started teaching him about all the branches of Islamic sciences (manqulat) but Abul Fazl could not adhere to conventional learning and he sank in a state of mental depression. A friend rescued him from this state and he resumed his studies. Some incidents from his early life reflect on his brilliance. A dictionary of Ishafani, which had been eaten by white ants came under his observation. He removed the parts that had been eaten and joined blank paper to the rest. He discovered the beginning and end of each fragment and eventually penned a draft text. Subsequently, the entire work was discovered and on comparison to Abul Fazl's draft the original differed in only two or three places.

He came to Akbar's court in 1575 and was influential in Akbar's religious views becoming more liberal into the 1580s and 1590s. In 1599, Abu’l Fazl was given his first office in the Deccan plateau, where he was recognized for his ability as a military commander, leading the Mughal imperial army in its wars against the Deccan sultanates.

Akbar also records witnessing the passage of the Great Comet of 1577.

=== Abul Fazl's own account of his first twenty years ===
The following is the Abul Fazl's own account of his first twenty years from the A'in-i-Akbari:

As I have now recounted somewhat of my ancestors, I proceed to say a few words regarding myself and thus unburden my mind, to refresh this narrative and loosen the bonds of my tongue. In the year 473 of the Jalali era, corresponding to the night of Sunday, the 6th of Muharram 958 of the lunar reckoning (14 January 1551), my pure spirit joined to this elemental body came forth from the womb into this fair expanse of the world. At a little over one year I had the miraculous gift of fluent speech and at five years of age I had acquired an unusual stock of information and could both read and write. At the age of seven I became the treasurer of my father's stores of knowledge and a trusty keeper of the jewels of hidden meaning and as a serpent, guarded the treasure. And it was strange that by a freak of fortune my heart was disinclined, my will ever averse, and my disposition repugnant to conventional learning and the ordinary courses of instruction. Generally I could not understand them. My father in his way conjured with the spell of knowledge and taught me a little of every branch of science, and although my intelligence grew, I gained no deep impressions from the school of learning. Sometimes I understood nothing at all, at others doubts suggested themselves which my tongue was incapable of explaining. Either shame made me hesitate or I had not the power of expression. I used to weep in public and put all the blame upon myself. In this state of things I came into fellowship of mind with a congenial helper and my spirit recovered from that ignorance and incomprehension. Not many days had elapsed before his conversation and society induced me to go to college and there they restored to rest my bewildered and dissipated mind and by the wondrous working of destiny they took me away and brought another back.

The temple as I entered, drew they nigh
And brought their gift, a wine-cup brimming high.
Its strength snatched all my senses, self from self,
Wherein some other entered and not I.

The truths of philosophy and the subtleties of the schools now appeared plain, and a book which I had never before seen gave me a clearer insight than any thing I could read. Although I had a special gift which came down upon me from the throne of holiness, yet the inspirations of my venerable father and his making me commit to memory the essential elements of every branch of science, together with the unbroken continuity of this chain, were of immense help, and became one of the most important causes of my enlightenment. For ten years longer I made no distinction between night and day, teaching and learning, and recognised no difference between satiety and hunger, nor discriminated between privacy and society, nor had I the power to dissever pain from pleasure. I acknowledged nothing else but the bond of demonstration and the tie of knowledge. Those who had a regard for my constitution, from seeing that two and sometimes three days passed without my taking food, and that my studious spirit had no inclination therefore, were amazed, and stood out strongly against it. I answered that my withdrawal, was now a matter of habit and custom, and how was it that no one was astonished when the natural inclination of a sick man on an attack of illness was averse from food. If therefore my love of study induced forgetfulness, where was the wonder? Most of the current arguments of the schools, frequently misquoted and misunderstood when heard, and abstruse questions from ancient works, had been presented to the fresh tablet of my mind. Before these points had been elucidated and the attribution to me of extreme ignorance had passed to that of transcendent knowledge, I had taken objection to ancient writers, and men learning my youth, dissented, and my mind was troubled and my inexperienced heart was in agitation. Once in the early part of my career they brought the gloss of Khwajah Abu'l Qasim, on the Mutawwal. All that I had stated before learned doctors and divines of which some of my friends had taken notes, was there found, and those present were astounded and withdrew their dissent, and began to regard me with other eyes and to raise the wicket of misunderstanding and to open the gate of comprehension. In my early days of study, the gloss of Isfahani more than half of which had been eaten by white ants, came under my observation. The public being in despair at profiting by it, I removed the parts that had been eaten and joined blank paper to the rest. In the serene hours of morning, with a little reflection, I discovered the beginnings and endings of each fragment and conjecturally penned a draft text which I transcribed on the paper. In the meanwhile the entire work was discovered, and when both were compared, in two or three places only were there found differences of words, though synonymous in meaning; and in three or four others, (differing) citations but approximate in sense. All were astounded.

The more my will was engaged, the more my mind was illumined. At the age of twenty the good tidings of my independence reached me. My mind cast off its former bonds and my early bewilderment recurred. With a parade of much learning, the intoxication of youth effervescing, the skirts of pretension spread wide, and the world-displaying cup of wisdom in my hand, the ringings of delirium began to sound in my ears, and suggested a total withdrawal from the world. Meanwhile, the wise prince-regnant called me to mind and drew me from my obscurity, somewhat of which I have in its entirety and somewhat but approximately suggested and acknowledged. Here my coin has been tested and its full weight passed into currency. Men now view me with a different regard, and many effusive speeches have been made amid felicitous congratulations evoked.

On this day which is the last of the 42nd year of His Majesty's reign (A.D. 1598), my spirit again breaks away from its yoke and a new solicitude arises within me.

My songster heart knows not King David's strains:
Let it go free—'tis no bird for a cage.

I know not how it will all end nor in what resting-place my last journey will have to be made, but from the beginning of my existence until now the grace of God has continuously kept me under its protection. It is my firm hope that my last moments may be spent in doing His will and that I may pass unburdened to eternal rest.

== Works ==
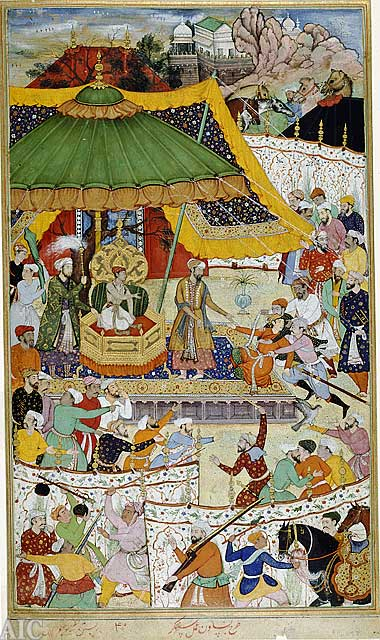
The court of Akbar, an illustration from a manuscript of the Akbarnama

=== The Akbarnama ===
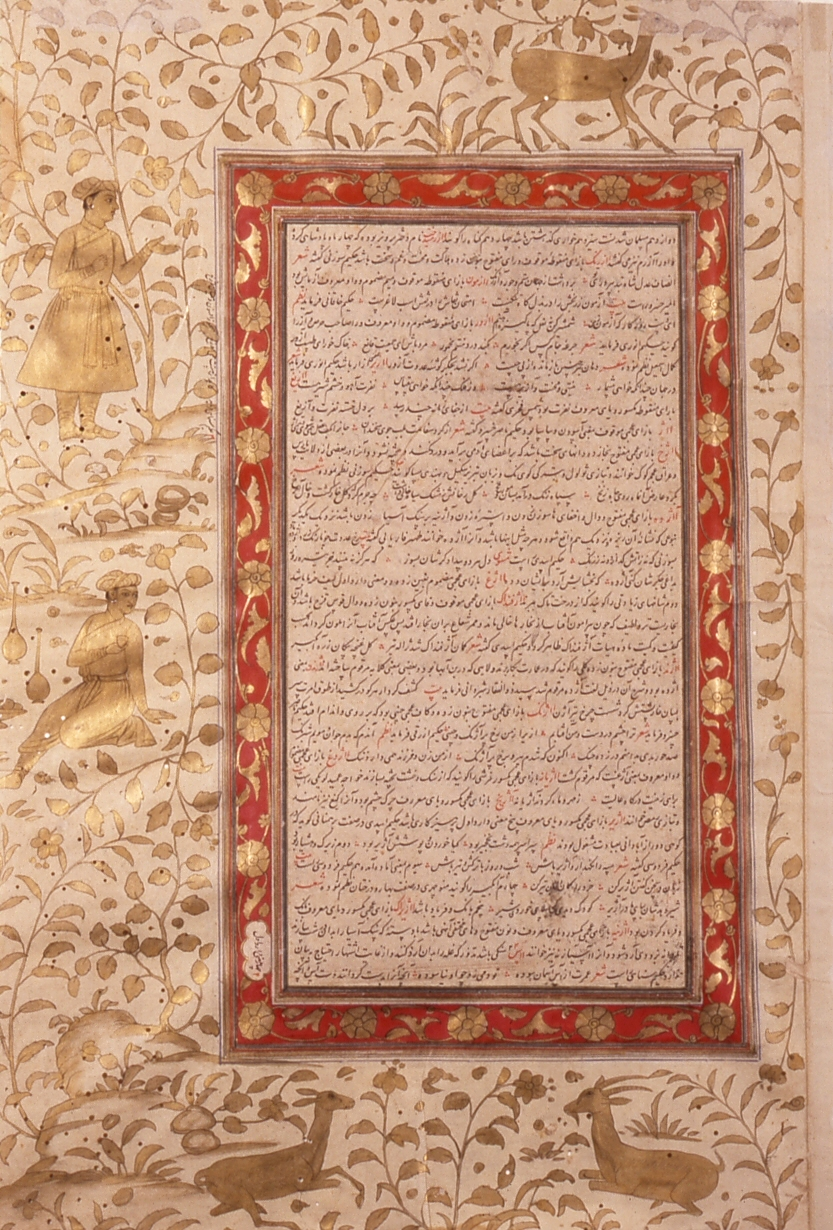
Manuscript of the Akbarnama originally written by Abul Fazl. This was later pasted on the Farhang-i Jahangiri.

The Akbarnama is a document of history of Akbar's reign and his ancestors spread over three volumes. It contains the history of Akbar's ancestors from Timur to Humayun, Akbar's reign up to the 46th regnal year (1602), and an administrative report of Akbar's empire, the Ain-i-Akbari, which itself is in three volumes. The third volume of Ain-i-Akbari gives an account of the ancestry and life of the author. The Ain-i-Akbari was completed in the 42nd regnal year, but a slight addition was made to it in the 43rd regnal year on the account of the conquest of Berar.

=== Ruqaʿāt ===
The Ruqaʿāt or the Ruqaʿāt-i-Abu'l Fazl is a collection of private letters from Abū al-Fażl to Murad, Daniyal, Akbar, Mariam Makani, Salim (Jahangir), Akbar's queens and daughters, his father, mother and brothers and several other notable contemporaries compiled by his nephew Nūr al-Dīn Muḥammad.

=== Inshā-i-Abu'l Fazl ===
The Inshā-i-Abu'l Fazl or the Maqtubāt-i-Allami contains the official despatches written by Abu'l Fazl. It is divided into two parts. The first part contains Akbar's letters to Abdullah Khan Uzbeg of Turan, Shah Abbas of Persia, Raja Ali Khan of Khandesh, Burhan al-Mulk of Ahmadnagar and his own nobles such as Abdur Rahim Khan-i-Khanan. The second part consists Abu'l Fazl's letters to Akbar, Daniyal, Mirza Shah Rukh and Khan Khanan. This collection was compiled by Abd as-Samad, son of Afzal Muhammad, who claims that he was Abu'l Fazl's sister's son as well as his son-in-law.

== Governance and sovereignty ==
Abul Fazl in the political sphere was concerned with social stability. In his Ain-i-Akbari, he presented a theory of sovereignty promised on social contract.

His divine theory of 'Padishahat', present the concept of royalty. According to him 'Padishahat' meant 'an established owner' where 'Pad' stands for stability and 'shah' stands for owner. Padishah therefore is the established owner who cannot be eliminated by anyone. According to Abul Fazl, Padishah has been sent by God, who works as an agent of God for the welfare of his subjects and maintains peace and harmony in his empire.

With respect to sovereignty, Abul Fazl considered it to be present in nature. The king established his sovereignty through his absolute power, he had the final authority in governance, administration, agriculture, education and other fields. According to Abul Fazl, it was impossible to challenge the king and nobody could share his power.

=== Sulh-i-Kul (The doctrine of peace) ===
Abul Fazl said that sovereignty was not restricted to a particular faith. As the king was considered an agent of God, he cannot discriminate among various faiths present in society and in case the king discriminates on the basis of caste, religion or class then he would not be considered a just king.

Sovereignty was not linked to any particular faith. Abul Fazl promoted the good values of different religions and assembled them for the maintenance of peace. He provided relief to people by making them free from bound thoughts. He also justified the views of Akbar by presenting him as a rational ruler.

== Death ==
Abu'l Fazl was assassinated in 1602 while he was returning from the Deccan by Vir Singh Deo Bundela (who later became the ruler of Orchha) between Sarai Vir and Antri (near Narwar) in a plot contrived by Akbar's eldest son Prince Salim (who later became the Emperor Jahangir), because Abu'l Fazl was known to oppose the accession of Prince Salim to the throne. His severed head was sent to Salim at Allahabad. Abu'l Fazl was buried at Antri. Abu'l Fazl's son Shaikh Afzal Khan (29 December 1571 – 1613) was later appointed governor of Bihar in 1608 by Jahangir.

The Abul Fazl Shrine is a shrine and mosque, located in Kabul, Afghanistan, that was completed in c. 2010 and named in his honour.

== Popular culture ==
=== Films and television ===
- In the 2014 historical drama series Siyaasat aired on The EPIC Channel, he is portrayed by Bikramjeet Kanwarpal.
- In the 2018 historical drama series Dastaan-E-Mohabbat Salim Anarkali aired on Colors TV, he is portrayed by Piyush Sahdev.
- In the 2023 ZEE5's web series Taj: Divided by Blood, he is portrayed by Pankaj Saraswat.
