= ʽAbd al-Qadir Badayuni =

Indian writer, historian, and translator (1540–1615)

Abd al-Qadir Badayuni
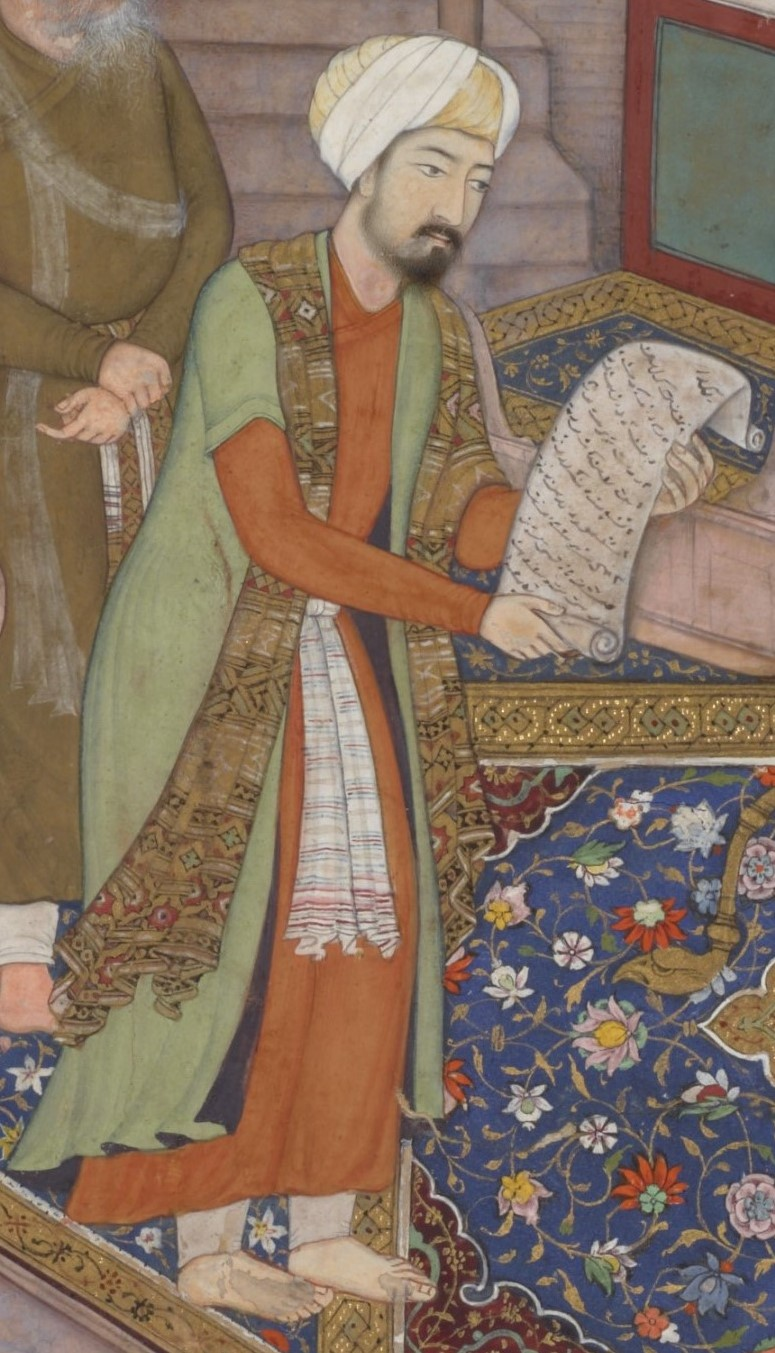
- Badāʾūnī brings the news of the victory at Haldighati, June 1576. By Manohar Das
- Pronunciation: Abd al-Qādir al-Badāyūni
- Born: Abdul Qadir; 21 August 1540; Badayun, Mughal Empire
- Died: 1615; Agra, Agra Subah, Mughal Empire
- Era: Mughal India

Personal life
- Home town: Agra
- Notable work: Tarikh-i-Bada'uni also known as Muntakhab-ut-Tawarikh
- Known for: Historian, Islamic scholar, linguist and courtier

Senior posting
- Influenced by: Usman Bengali

'Abd al-Qadir Badayuni (21 August 1540 – 1615) was an Indian writer, historian, and translator. He lived in the Mughal Empire. He translated into Persian the Hindu works, the Ramayana and the Mahabharata (Razmnama).

== Life ==
Badayuni was a Rajasthani Shaikhzada and a son of Muluk Shah. He grew up in Basavar, studying in Sambhal and Agra. In 1562, he moved to Badaun, the town after which he was named, before moving to Patiala to enter the service of prince Husayn Khan for the next nine years. His later years of study were led by Muslim mystics. The Mughal emperor, Akbar, appointed him to the religious office in the royal courts in 1574 where he spent much of his career.

== Major works ==
Badayuni wrote Muntakhab-ut-Tawarikh (Selection of Chronicles) or Tarikh-i-Badayuni (Badayuni's History) which was completed in 1595 (1004 AH). This work in three volumes is a general history of the Muslims of India. The first volume contains an account of Babur and Humayun. The second volume exclusively deals with Akbar's reign up to 1595. This volume is an unusually frank and critical account of Akbar's administration, in particular, his religious views and his conduct. This volume was kept concealed until Akbar's death and was published after Jahangir's accession. This book gives a contemporary perspective regarding the development of Akbar's views on religion and his religious policy. The third volume describes the lives and works of Muslim religious figures, scholars, physicians and poets.

The first printed edition of the text of this work was published by the College Press, Calcutta in 1865 and later this work was translated into English by G.S.A. Ranking (Vol.I), W.H. Lowe (Vol.II) and T.W. Haig (Vol.III) (published by the Asiatic Society, Calcutta between 1884 and 1925 as a part of their Bibliotheca Indica series).

== In popular culture ==
- Irrfan Khan played Badayuni in Doordarshan's historical drama Bharat Ek Khoj (1988-1989).
- He was portrayed by Aayam Mehta in Taj: Divided by Blood.
