= Asad Khan (Bijapuri noble) =

Official of the Sultanate of Bijapur (died 1549)

Asad Khan (died 1549), earlier named Yusuf Lari, was a noble and general of the Sultanate of Bijapur. As a wealthy official and head of the sultanate's military, he played a crucial role in the installment of Mallu Adil Shah, his overthrow from power six months later, and later the unsuccessful deposition of Ibrahim Adil Shah I.

== Biography ==
Born outside the Deccan a Turkman from Persia, Yusuf Lari (Note: According to historian Emma J. Flatt, "Yusuf Lari" was a slave name referring to his owner and place of origin) was brought to the region as a slave and entered into the service of Yusuf Adil Shah of the Sultanate of Bijapur. He assisted in deposing the regent of Yusuf's designated successor, Kamal Khan, who had pushed Sunni practices upon the sultanate, oppressed Yusuf Lari's affiliated afaqis court faction, and later abused his power. This provided for Yusuf Lari's accession to leadership of the afaqis, and as a reward for his efforts, he was given charge of the estate of the heavily fortified Belgaum, while he received the title he is commonly referred to, Asad Khan. Administration of Belgaum, a valuable point of trade, greatly increased Asad Khan's wealth, while he gained further riches pursuing campaigns as the ispahsalar (senior commander) of Bijapur's military.

In 1518, he aided in the construction of a mosque, called the Masjid Safa, in his jagir of Belgaum. A joint Persian–Arabic inscription attests his ownership of the fort and creation of the mosque.

His influence as a highly potent official gave him sway in dynastic politics, through which he was able to guarantee the accession of Mallu Adil Shah to the throne in 1534. Switching sides half a year later from Mallu's realised incompetence, he supported the deposition of Mallu in place of Ibrahim Adil Shah I.

Under the reign of Ibrahim, Asad Khan was given the role of prime minister, and openly defied the statewide decree of the sultan changing the religion in the sultanate to Sunni Islam, following Shiism. Plots were sprung up against him twice, purporting of his alleged future misdeeds against the sultanate, both of which Ibrahim fell victim to believing: the first in 1540 saw Asad Khan's rival Yusuf Turk allege that he, along with his land of Belgaum, were to defect to the Ahmadnagar Sultanate in outrage of the state's change in doctrinal creed. He fled to Belgaum, being pursued by Yusuf Turk and Ibrahim, but through a prolonged conflict involving multiple of the Deccan sultanates, was able to retain it and ultimately have land gained from the now-imprisoned Yusuf Turk by someone of similar interests as he. In 1543, a coalition was formed by Asad Khan of Ahmadnagar, Bidar, and Bijapur to depose Ibrahim from power; the sultan took notice of this, and a drawn-out, but ultimately unsuccessful affair ensued putting on display Asad Khan's influence, not restricted to the borders of the Bijapur Sultanate.

Asad Khan died in 1549, and retained Belgaum his whole career. Burhan Nizam Shah I of Ahmadnagar took advantage of Asad Khan's death and invaded Bijapur soon after.
