= Adil Shahi–Portuguese conflicts =

- Part of Portuguese presence in Asia
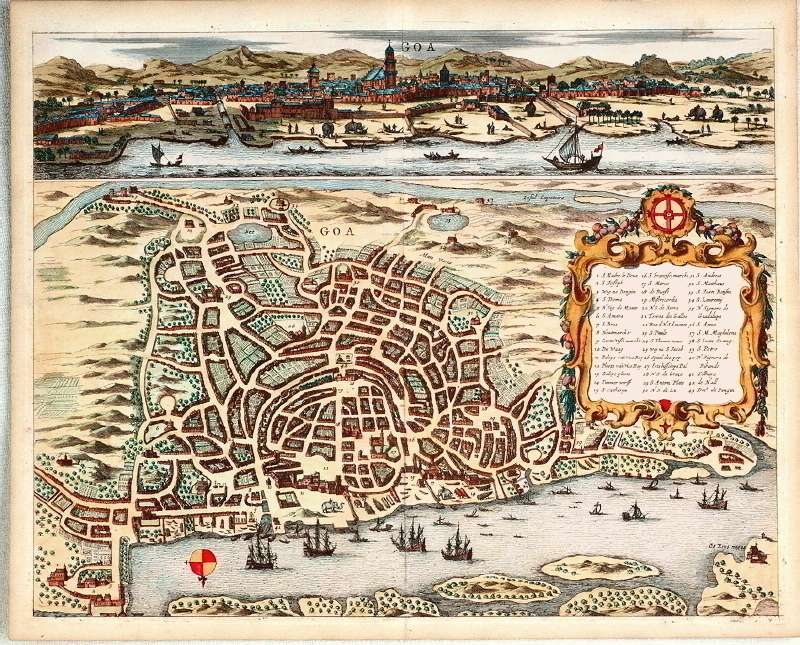
- Late 16th century illustration of Portuguese Goa
Date	1 March 1506–1659 (153 years)
Location	Deccan, India
Result
Territorial changes	Establishment of Portuguese Goa

Belligerents
Portuguese Empire; Supported by: Vijayanagara Empire	Sultanate of Bijapur; Supported by: Kingdom of Calicut; Sultanate of Ahmadnagar; Kingdom of Gerusoppa; Dutch East India Company

Commanders and leaders
Dom Francisco de Almeida; Afonso de Albuquerque; Dom Guterre de Monroy; Nuno da Cunha; Dom João de Castro; Dom Diogo de Meneses; Dom Luís de Ataíde; Dom Brás de Castro; Timoji Saluva	Yusuf Adil Shah; Ismail Adil Shah; Pulad Khan; Rassul Khan (WIA); Ibrahim Adil Shah I; Ashad Khan; Ali Adil Shah I; Mohammed Adil Shah; Ali Adil Shah II

The Adil Shahi–Portuguese conflicts were various armed engagements that took place in India between the Portuguese Empire and the Sultanate of Bijapur, ruled by the Adil Shahi dynasty, whose rulers were known to the Portuguese as Hidalcão.

The Sultanate of Bijapur was one of the Deccan Sultanates. The Portuguese first clashed with the forces of Bijapur in 1506 at the siege of Angediva. The Portuguese governor of India Afonso de Albuquerque captured Goa in 1510 after its ruler was found to be harbouring mercenaries there and preparing an expedition to send against the Portuguese.

Goa became the capital of the Portuguese State of India and head of all Portuguese possessions in Asia until 1961, though the Sultanate of Bijapur ceased to exist when it was conquered by the Mughal Empire in 1686.

== Background ==
In 1498, the Portuguese established direct contact with India by sea after Vasco da Gama sailed around the Cape of Good Hope and reached Calicut. An alliance was struck with the Raja of Cochin in the Malabar Coast, who was a rebellious vassal of the Zamorin of Calicut and fort Manuel was built on his territory in 1502.

At this time, southern India was divided between the mutually hostile Hindu Vijayanagara Empire and the Muslim Deccan Sultanates in the Deccan Plateau. The Sultanate of Bijapur was created out of the Bahmani Sultanate after Yusuf Adil Shah declared independence in 1490. As a Muslim power, it was hostile to the presence of the Portuguese in India.

In 1505, King Manuel of Portugal nominated Dom Francisco de Almeida as the first Viceroy of India. Among other things, Dom Francisco was tasked with building a fort on Angediva Island, which was believed to be useful to conduct trade at safely and support Portuguese fleets operating in the region.

== Siege of Angediva, 1506 ==
The Portuguese first clashed with the forces of Bijapur in 1506 when the lord of Goa attempted to capture the fort the viceroy Dom Francisco de Almeida had built on Angediva Island six months before. The forces of Bijapur numbered 60 sail but although they managed to land on the island in the dead of the night or by dawn they were met with an unexpected sally and repulsed. The fort was dismantled shortly afterwards.

== Battle of Dabul, 1509 ==
The Portuguese conducted a punitive attack against Dabul in 1509 after the naval squadrons of the city harassed the armada of the viceroy Dom Francisco de Almeida en route to the Battle of Diu. In spite of fierce resistance by its defenders, the settlement was stormed, sacked and razed, with many of its inhabitants perishing.

== Portuguese conquest of Goa, 1510–1512 ==
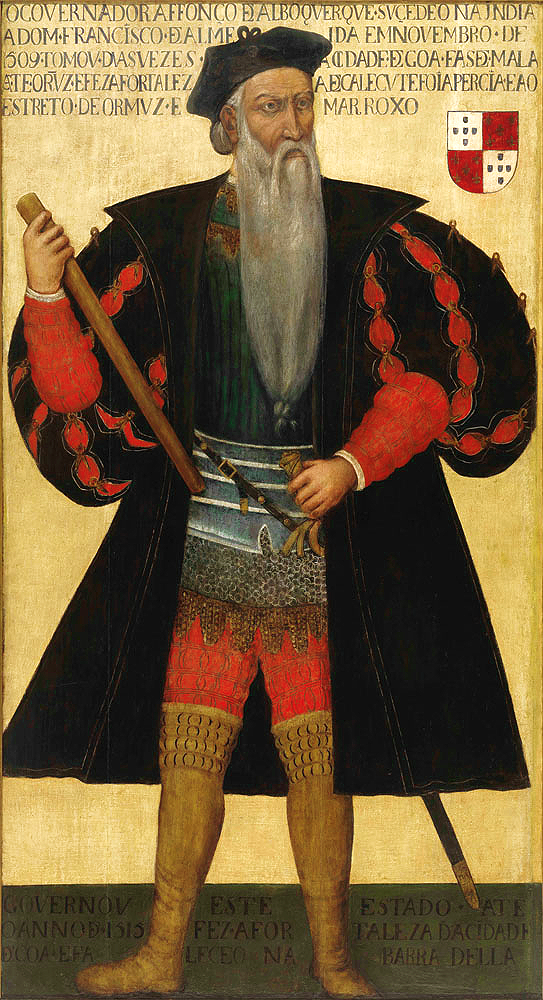
Afonso de Albuquerque, II governor of India.

When the governor of India Afonso de Albuquerque learnt that Mamluk mercenaries defeated at the Battle of Diu were being regrouped and refitted by Yusuf Adil Shah at Goa, he determined to occupy the strategically-located city to serve as capital of the Portuguese State of India. He got the information from one of the local contacts of the Portuguese in the Malabar Coast, the Hindu privateer Timoja.

The Portuguese captured Goa on the second attempt in November 25, 1510, Day of Saint Catherine. The forces of Bijapur besieged the city for the first time but were unable to drive the Portuguese out and withdrew at the end of a two-year conflict.

Unlike the forts built in the allied kingdoms of Cannanore and Cochin, Goa featured a hinterland which was also annexed. By capturing Goa, Albuquerque became the second European to conquer land in India, after Alexander the Great.

== Second Siege of Goa, 1517 ==
In 1517, the governor of India Lopo Soares de Albergaria sailed to the Red Sea with a large armada and while he was away with the bulk of Portuguese forces, the captain of Goa Dom Guterre de Monroy raided the neighbouring lands of Bijapur. Ismail Adil Shah had just signed a peace with the neighbouring Sultan of Ahmednagar and attempted to recover the city with an army of 20,000 to 22,000 men The Portuguese mobilized the native Goan militia and after receiving reinforcements from Europe forced the army of Bijapur to withdraw.

== Occupation of Bardez, Salcete and Pondá, 1520–1524 ==
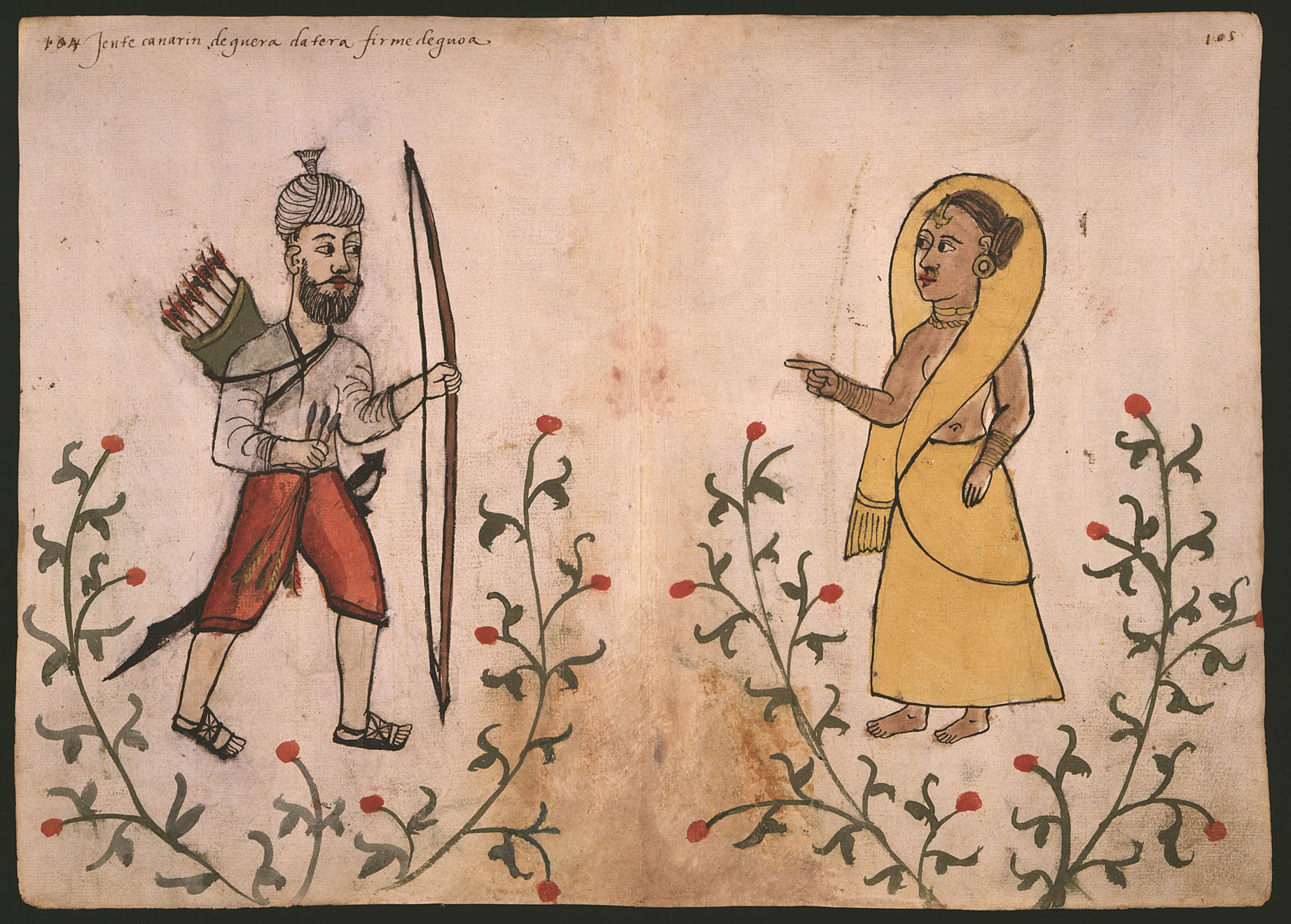
Portuguese sketch of a Kanarese foot-soldier of Goa from the Códice Casanatense.

The Portuguese occupied Bardez, Salcete and Ponda between 1520 and 1524 owing to a conflict between Bijapur and Vijayanagara over the Raichur Doab.

In 1520 the Vijayanagara Emperor Krishnadevaraya sieged the Rachol fort in Salcete with the support of 20 Portuguese mercenaries, and although Ismail Adil Shah came to the aid of the fortress his army (which also included 40 Portuguese mercenaries) was routed in battle. The district of Rachol was captured by Krishnadevaraya and then granted to the Portuguese.

A Hindu detachment of 8000 men then marched to annex the remaining districts. Lacking the men to defend it, the local Muslim governor requested that the Portuguese captain of Goa Ruy de Mello either help him repulse the attack or take over it those lands, in the hopes that he'd be able to keep its revenue. Mello occupied the districts with some cavalry and infantry and as he approached the Hindus withdrew.

The mainland territories were later recovered by the Adil Shah between 1523 and 1524. In 1523 the chief tax-collector Fernão Annes de Souto-Maior was attacked and sieged for two days at a temple in Mardol that was built like a fort, by a 5000 men force dispatched by the Adil Shah. A brief combat was struck after António Correia arrived to souccour Fernão Annes but although the Muslims were badly mauled the governor of India decided to quit the lands so as not to break the peace previously signed with the Adil Shah.

== Luso-Adil Shahi conflicts 1532–1537 ==
The mainland districts adjacent to Goa fell under Portuguese control once more between 1532 and 1537 after the governor of Belgaum Ashad Khan lost the favor of the sultan of Bijapur and granted the territory to the Portuguese in exchange for protection. When Ashads relation with the Adil Shah improved, he invaded the lands he had granted to the Portuguese in an effort to recover them, though the Portuguese defeated his forces. The Portuguese signed a peace with Ashad Khan in 1536-1537 and returned the territory in order to focus against Bahadur Shah of Gujarat.

== Luso-Adil Shahi War 1547–1548 ==
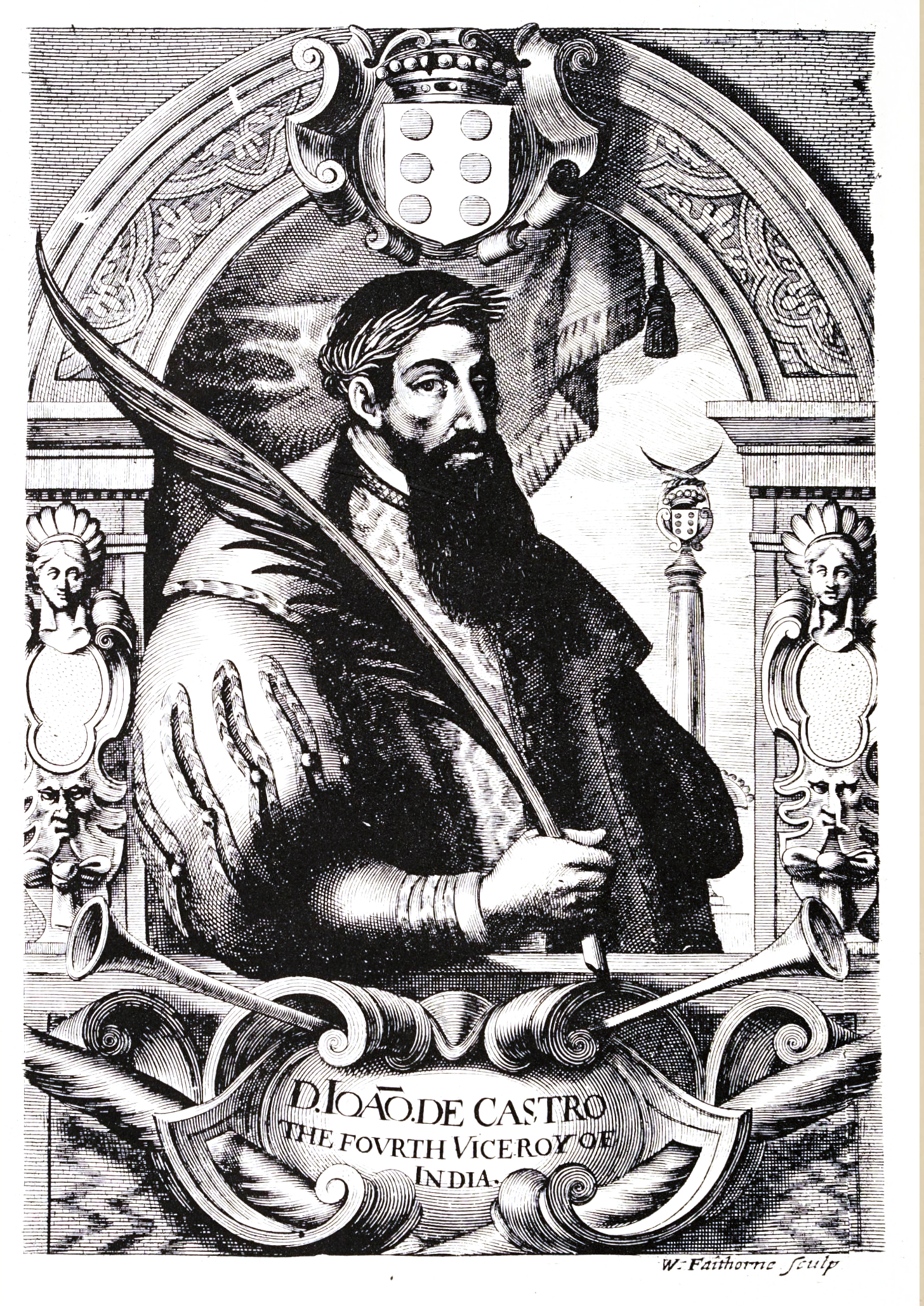
The viceroy of India Dom João de Castro.

The lands of Salcete and Bardez were ceded to the Portuguese in 1543 but invaded by the forces of the Adil Shah in 1547 after the Portuguese had provided shelter in the city to a rival claimant to the throne, Mallu Adil Shah (Meale in Portuguese). The governor Dom João de Castro dispatched Diogo de Almeida with 300 horsemen and 400 infantry but upon approaching Colem, the 4000 men of Bijapur stationed there withdrew. The Adil Shah sent a new army of 13,000 men and Almeida retreated in the face of numerical superiority, but Castro reinforced him in person with 1500 men. The forces of Bijapur again withdrew, but they were pursued by the Portuguese and routed at the fort of Pondá.

On his way back to Goa from a campaign along the shores of Gujarat, Dom João de Mascarenhas attacked Dabul. The lands of Salsette and Bardês where invaded once again by Calabate Khan, but the forces of Bijapur abandoned their equipment and withdrew to the mountains of Colem, when Castro marched out to meet him with 1500 horse and 4000 foot. A battle took place on the mountains of Colem, Calabate Khan was killed and the forces of Bijapur retreated.

The Portuguese signed an alliance with the Vijaynagara Emperor in September 1547 against all mutual enemies except the Sultan of Ahmadnagar, and in October 1547 signed an alliance with the Sultan of Ahmadnagar against the Sultan of Bijapur, thus isolating him.

Castro signalled the beginning of the year of 1548 by a campaign along the shores of Bijapur. Amphibious operations began in January two leagues to the north of Goa at the Chapora River, the settlements around which were attacked and raided or burned with no quarter being given, and continued as far as River Cifardão, which marked the border between the Sultanate of Bijapur and the Sultanate of Ahmadnagar, the city of Dabul having been sacked along the way. Castro died in office and was succeeded by Garcia de Sá, who signed a peace treaty with the Adil Shah on August 22 1548 much to Portuguese advantage, according to which the Velhas Conquistas were confirmed as Portuguese property in perpetuity.

== Luso-Adil Shahi War 1555–1557 ==
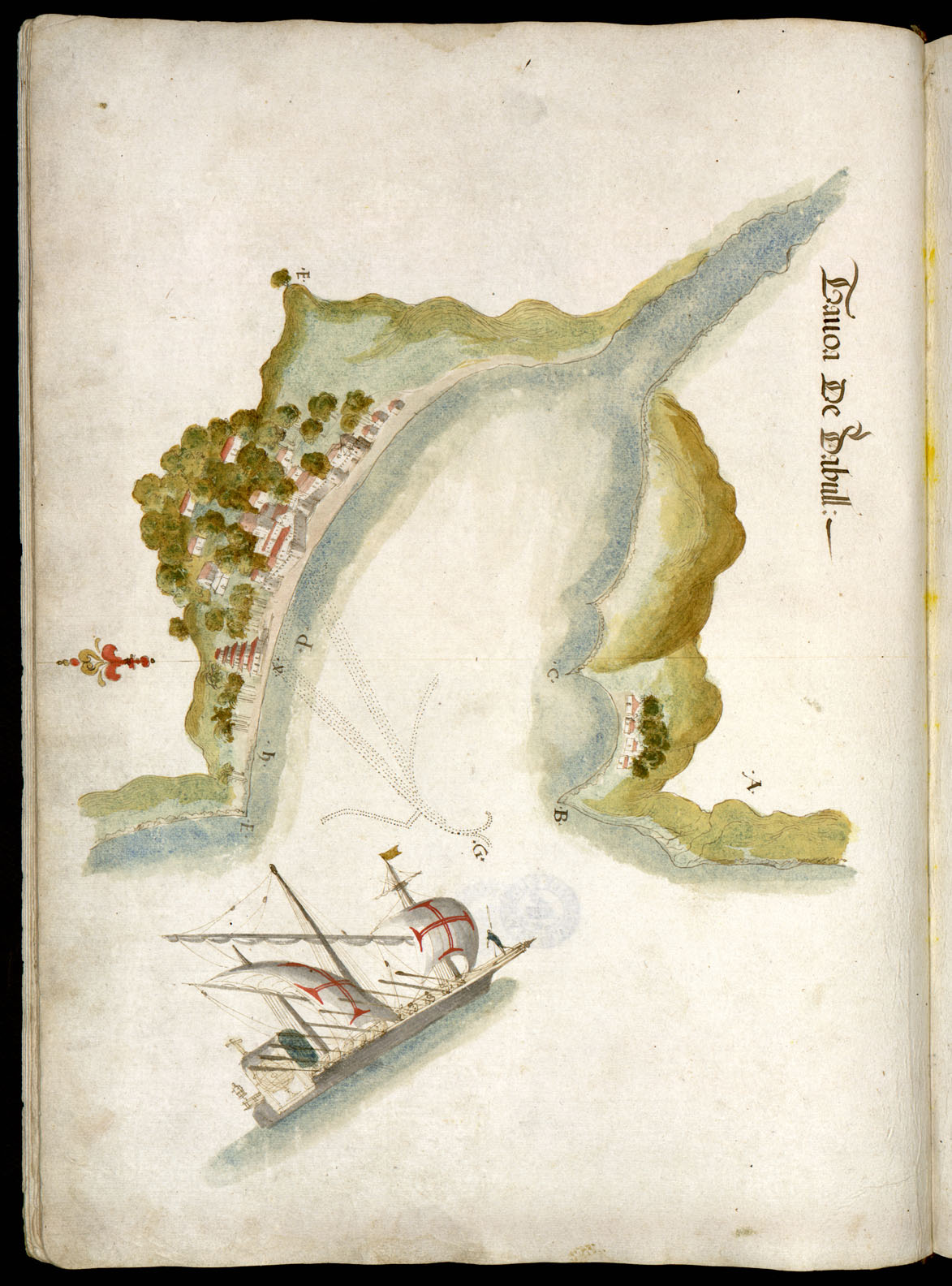
Sketch of a Portuguese galley at the Bijapur port city of Dabul by Dom João de Castro.

In 1555 the Portuguese instigated a revolt in Bijapur and attempted install Meale on the throne as a puppet.

The Portuguese governor of India Dom Pedro de Mascarenhas was contacted by a number of Bijapur nobles who sought his support for an impending revolt against the ruling Adil Shah. Meale received Portuguese support in exchange of a third of all captured loot and the ceding of nearly the entire coastal territories of Bijapur. Meale was crowned at Pondá and crossed the Western Ghats with an army of supporters. Dom Antão de Noronha was dispatched to take possession of the territories, and while collecting tributes at Curale he was attacked by a force of 7000 men by the river Carlim but the forces of Bijapur were routed. Meanwhile, Meale was defeated by Ibrahim Adil Shah, who had called upon the aid of an army of Vijayanagara. The Portuguese withdrew from all newly occupied territories to the Island of Goa, Bardes and Salcete.

Pedro Barreto Rolim later sacked Dabul. The Adil Shah then attempted to punish the Portuguese by having Bardez and Salcete invaded but this backfired as the Portuguese retaliated with vigor. The lands of Bardez were repeatedly raided by forces under the command of Morat-Khan, however they were repulsed by João Peixoto. General Nazer-Melek marched through Salsete and came in sight of the fortress of Rachol, from where captain Dom Pedro de Menezes o Ruivo sallied out with a number of men and skirmished favourably, but the Portuguese were ultimately forced to abandon the field. Aware of this, the new governor of India Francisco Barreto marched out with 200 horsemen, 3000 Portuguese soldiers, 1000 kanarese auxiliaries and routed Nazer-Melek at Pondá. Fighting continued in Salcete and the commander of Rachol Fort Dom Francisco de Mascarenhas fought with the forces of Bijapur. Nazer Melek entrenched himself at Pondá once more, but after a number of ships arrived from Portugal with fresh reinforcements, he sued for peace and a treaty was signed shortly afterwards.

The later years of 1550s and the 1560s saw the development of unexpectedly cordial relations between Goa and Bijapur, after Ibrahim Adil Shah was succeeded by Ali Adil Shah, who unlike previous sultans was described by the Portuguese as "most liberal and magnanimous", and with whom the Portuguese hoped to strike an alliance against the Ottomans. Portuguese focus therefore shifted to Gujarat and Ceylon.

== Siege of Goa, 1570–1571 ==
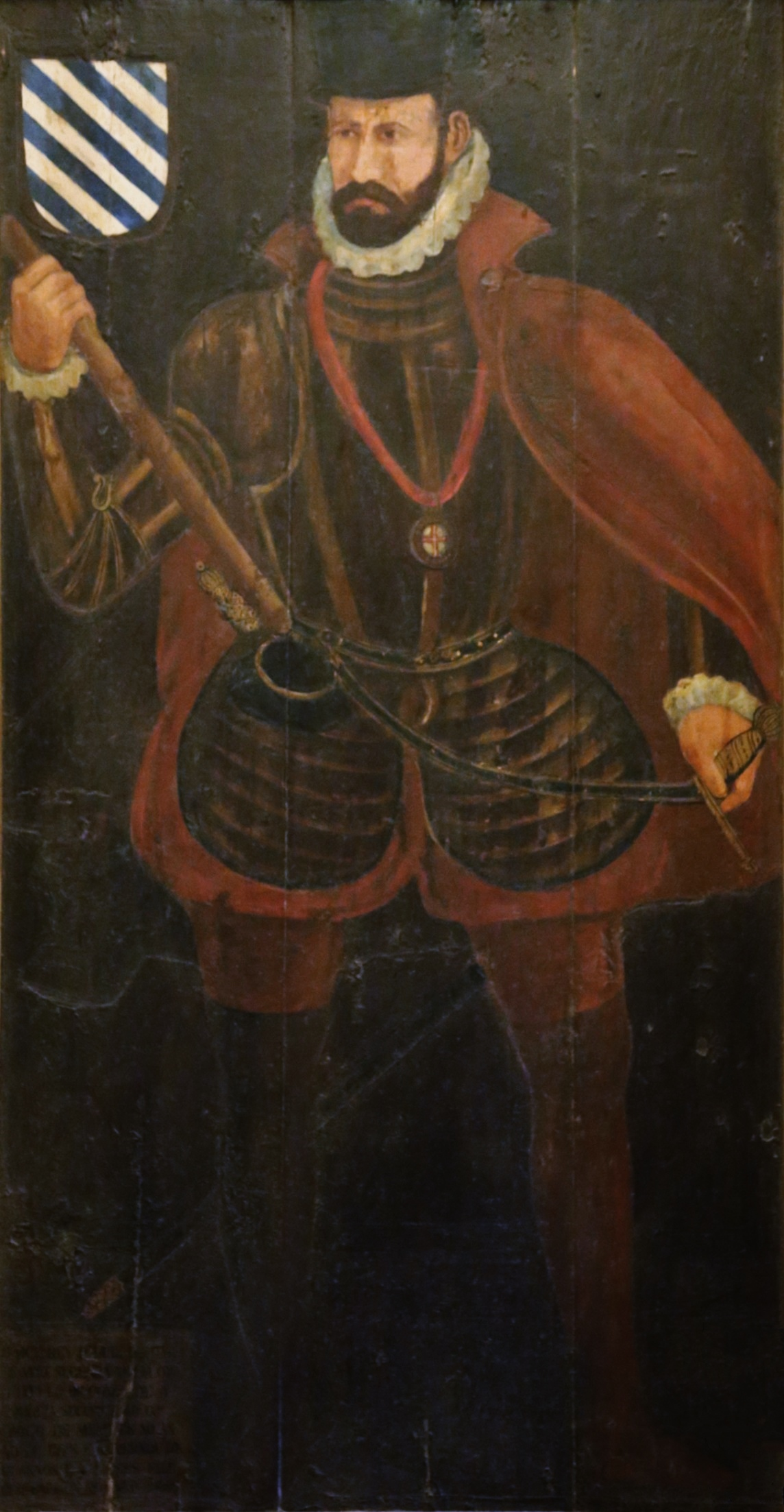
The Portuguese governor of India Dom Luís de Ataíde.

In December 1570 Goa was sieged by a large army commanded personally by Ali Adil Shah of Bijapur, who had struck a pact of alliance with the Sultan of Ahmadnagar, the Zamorin of Calicut, the Ali Raja of Cannanore, the Queen of Gerusoppa, the Sultan of Aceh, among others to try and drive the Portuguese out of Asia.

The viceroy of India Dom Luís de Ataíde was however able to keep the naval supply lines open while the forces of Bijapur proved unable to overcome Portuguese defenses. Once the monsoon was over Portuguese naval squadrons conducted amphibious operations against the coasts of Bijapur and before long a peace was signed in December 13, 1571.

== Luso-Adil Shahi War, 1577–1578 ==
During the tenure of governor Dom Diogo de Meneses, a fleet was dispatched to Terekhol River to the north of Goa, where the local governor was harbouring a malabarese pirate fleet against the terms of the peace treaty. As the governor refused to deliver the vessels, the local town was sacked and hostilities broke out between Goa and Bijapur once more. In late 1577 about 100 Portuguese soldiers who disembarked at Dabul unaware of the war were massacred.

After the Dabul incident, a powerful fleet commanded by Dom Paulo de Meneses was dispatched from Goa to conduct amphibious operations along the coasts of Bijapur in retaliation. In August 1578 Dom Luís de Ataíde took over governorship for the second time and intensified Portuguese naval efforts against Bijapur. A flotilla was captured in the harbour of Dabul.

Ali Adil Shah meanwhile invaded the mainland districts of Bardês and Salcete once more, however in 1578 peace was signed with governor Dom Luís de Ataíde.

== Luso-Adil Shahi War, 1654–1655 ==
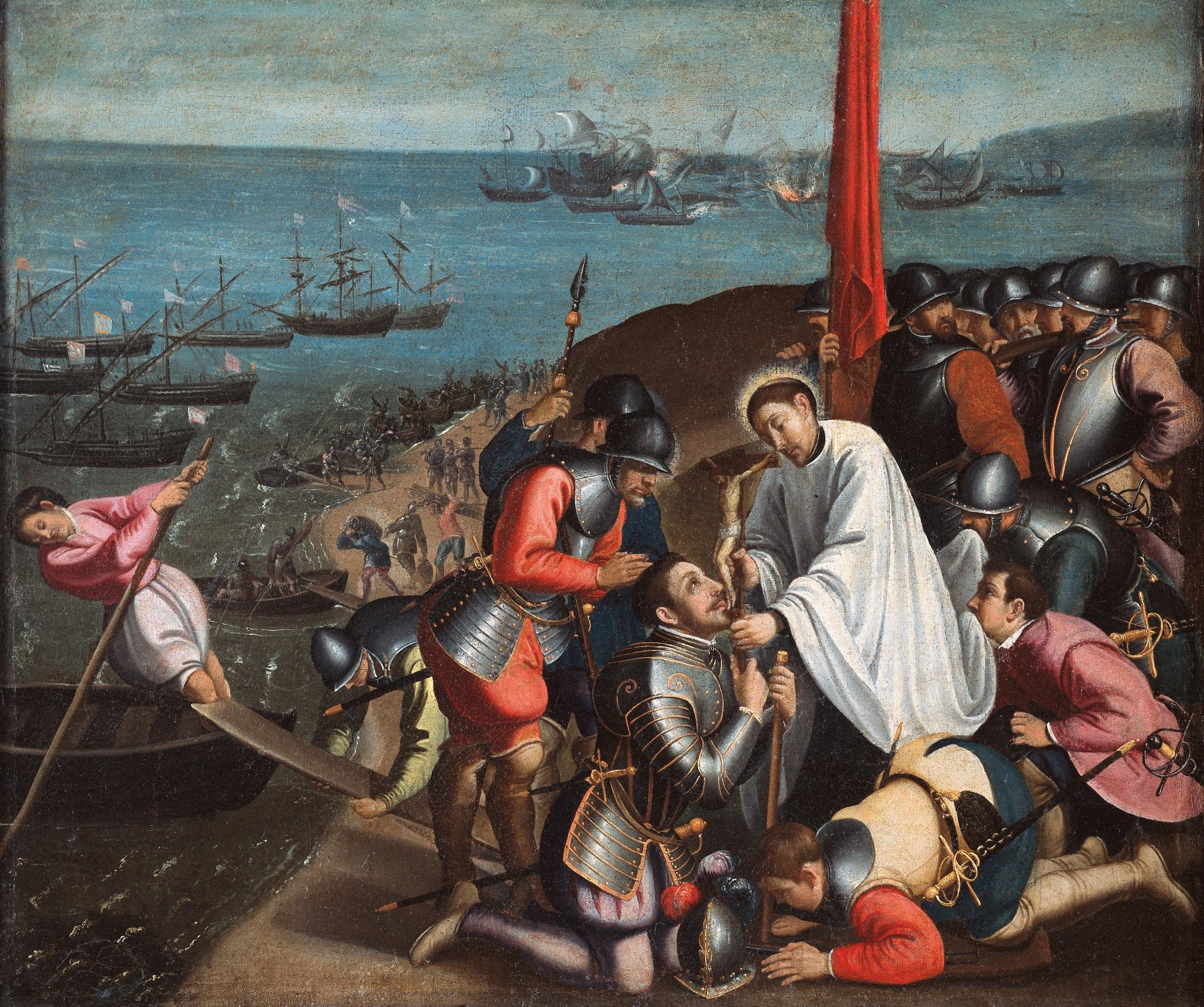
Portuguese soldiers in Asia in a 17th century painting.

The Dutch East India Company developed friendly ties with the Sultan of Bijapur, and encouraged him to attack the Portuguese.

Among the Court of Bijapur there was a party hostile to the Portuguese, led by the Queen Mother and Abdulla Hakim, who invaded Portuguese territory in 1654 with the backing of the Dutch, who instigated the attack. Between August and October 1654, the Sultan of Bijapur invaded the delta lands of Bardês and briefly put the supply of food into Goa in jeopardy. The forces of Bijapur were however repulsed. The Adil Shah admitted that he had declared war against Portugal without sufficient cause but had since ordered his captains to withdraw from Bardez and Salcete and his port to opened to commerce. Upon this explanation Dom Brás de Castro ratified anew the treaties of January 29, 1582 and April 3, 1633, on March 7, 1655.

== Luso-Adil Shahi War, 1659 ==
Ali Adil Shah II endeavoured to retake Portuguese territory around Goa and in 1659 Abdulla Hakim invaded the Velhas Conquistas. He was however routed by Luiz de Mendonça Furtado, who inflicted a severe defeat upon his forces at Margão and forced him to retire with the loss of 400 to 500 men.

== Aftermath ==
Map of the Velhas Conquistas (in red) and the Novas Conquista (yellow).

Conflict with the Sultanate of Bijapur resulted in the securing of Goa and Tiswadi island for Portugal and later of the Velhas Conquistas with the districts of Bardez and Salcete.

Notwithstanding occasional conflict over the possession of Goa, bilateral relations were established and Portuguese ambassadors, merchants and missionaries often frequented Adil Shahi domains including the capital. The Sultanate of Bijapur was one of the two major connections of Portuguese India, alongside the Mughal Empire. The sultans of Bijapur paid tribute to the king of Portugal in the form of gifts.

In October 22, 1576 the Portuguese signed a commercial treaty with Bijapur that remained valid until the Mughal Empire annexed Bijapur in 1686. The Portuguese provided sulphur, lead and copper while the Adil Shah would supply timber, steel, iron, sailors, stone cannon, ballast for the ships, saltpeter for gunpowder manufacture, and numerous other articles in return. Bijapur merchant ships would take in Portuguese naval trading licenses called cartaz and not transport goods banned by the Portuguese. The governors of India maintained close contacts with the Court of Bijapur and through these the Portuguese were able to exert some influence within its politics.

After the Portuguese captured Goa, the Adil Shahis lost the capacity to import high-quality warhorses directly from overseas, and became dependant on the Portuguese for this strategic asset. Whenever war broke out naval imports or exports in Bijapur were blockaded by the Portuguese navy.

In 1675 Portuguese India ceased to have common borders with Bijapur after Shivaji captured the entire coast of Bijapur.

== See also ==
- Military history of Portugal
- Portuguese India
- Acehnese-Portuguese conflicts
- Gujarati-Portuguese conflicts
- Malay-Portuguese conflicts
- Mamluk-Portuguese conflicts
- Mughal-Portuguese conflicts
- Ottoman–Portuguese conflicts (1538–1560)
- Ottoman–Portuguese conflicts (1586–1589)
- Sinhalese-Portuguese conflicts
- Deccan sultanates
