= Siege of Anjadiva (1506) =

Siege of Anjediva
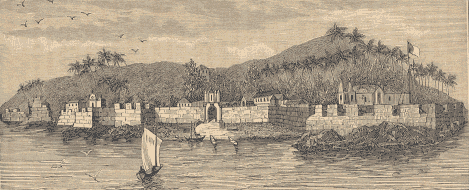
Date	1–16 March 1506
Location	Fort Anjediva
Result	Portuguese victory

Belligerents
Bijapur Sultanate	Portuguese Empire

Commanders and leaders
Yusuf Adil Shah; António Fernandes	Francisco de Almeida; Manuel Passanha

Strength
60 ships	Unknown

The siege of Angediva in 1506 took place when the sultan of Bijapur ordered the capture of the fortress that the Portuguese had built on the island of Angediva, his domain.

The island was explored on September 24, 1498 by Nicolau Coelho, a member of Vasco da Gama's expedition when he was on his way to Portugal after having discovered the sea route to India. Gama sent Nicolau Coelho to investigate the island with a boat. After disembarking on the island and sailing around it, Coelho returned to the flagship to inform Gama that on the island there were only the ruins of what seemed to him to be a church, some residents, a py, an aslacetic who lived in a cave, good water springs and a water tank. Vasco da Gama's fleet anchored there for 12 days resting the crews, loading provisions or water and repairing or fairing the ships. The island became, from now on, a favorite place for Portuguese navies to make watery.

On September 13, 1505, the first viceroy of Portuguese India, Francisco de Almeida laid the foundations of the fortress of Angediva. Due to the lack of lime, the fortress was built of stone joined with clay. Manuel Pessanha remained as captain and Francisco de Almeida left a galley and two brigantines there to serve as a service fleet and opened a trading post under Duarte Pereira.

The fortress was attacked just over six months later by a fleet of 60 ships in the service of the Sultan of Bijapur, "owner" of that island. A Portuguese renegade named António Fernandes commanded the fleet. The attack took place and the Muslims expected the fortress to surrender quickly, however, they were attacked by captain Manuel Pessanha and his men. The Muslims took refuge under trees on a hill and four days and nights later they fled, after realizing that the Portuguese garrison had come into contact with the fleet of Lourenço de Almeida.

Francisco de Almeida later ordered the fortress to be dismantled and the Portuguese later abandoned the island. They would reoccupy it later.

== See also ==
- Adil Shahi–Portuguese conflicts
