= Krishnadevaraya's Bahmani expedition =

1509–1512 Vijayanagara military campaign

- Part of Bahmani–Vijayanagar Wars
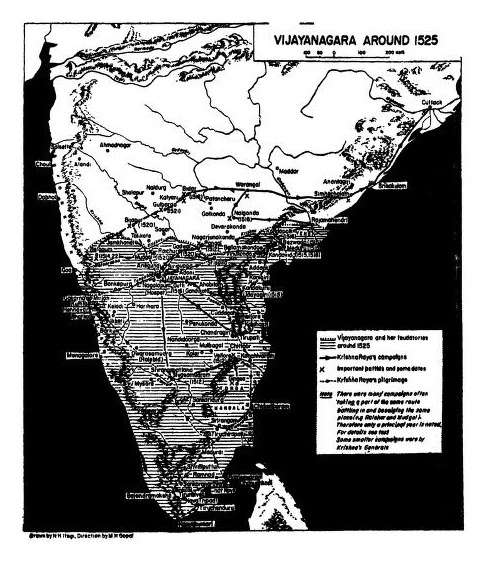
Date	1509–1512
Location	Karnataka and Koilkonda, Telangana
Result	Vijayanagara victory

Belligerents
Vijayanagara Empire	Bahmani Sultanate; Sultanate of Bijapur; Bidar Sultanate; Golconda Sultanate; Ahmadnagar Sultanate

Commanders and leaders
Krishnadevaraya; Timmarusu	Mahmood Shah Bahmani II (WIA); Yusuf Adil Shah †; Amir Barid I Malik Ahmed Bahri; Nuri Khan; Khwaja-i-jahan; Adil Khan; Qutb-ul-Mulk; Dastur-i-Mamalik; Mirza Latf-ul-tab

Krishnadevaraya's Bahmani expedition (1509-1512) was a military campaign between the Bahmani Sultanate and the Vijayanagara Empire in the Deccan region of India.

== Background ==
In 1509, Bahmani nobles gathered in Bidar and joined Mahmud Shah II, who declared a jihad against the Vijayanagara Empire. Krishnadevaraya, the emperor of Vijayanagara, responded with forces of his own.

== Campaign ==
=== Battle of Diwani ===
The Muslim armies were halted at the unidentified town of Diwani, where the sultan Mahmud Shah II was wounded in the ensuing battle. The sultan's nobles retreated to Kovilkonda.

=== Battle of Kovilkonda ===
Krishnadevaraya pursued the withdrawing Bahmani and Bijapuri forces and brought them to battle near Kovilkonda, resulting in a decisive vistory and the death of Yusuf Adil Khan.

=== Battle near the Krishna River (1512) ===
In 1512, Krishnadevaraya marched towards the Krishna river along with 30,000 cavalry and 300,000 infantry. Forces from Golconda Sultanate marched to meet him, joined by others from Bijapur and Ahmadnagar. In the ensuring battle Kamma chief, Rāmalinga Naidu led an attack on the enemy camp with threw them into disarray. Krishnadevaraya pressed the advantage and the opposing forces were nearly annhilated, with the exception of some who escaped across the river.

== Aftermath ==
Following the campaign, Krishnadevaraya established the newly-subjugated territories as a new province governed from Seringapatam, and then returned to his capital.
