= Battle of Raichur =

War in India

- Part of Deccani–Vijayanagar wars
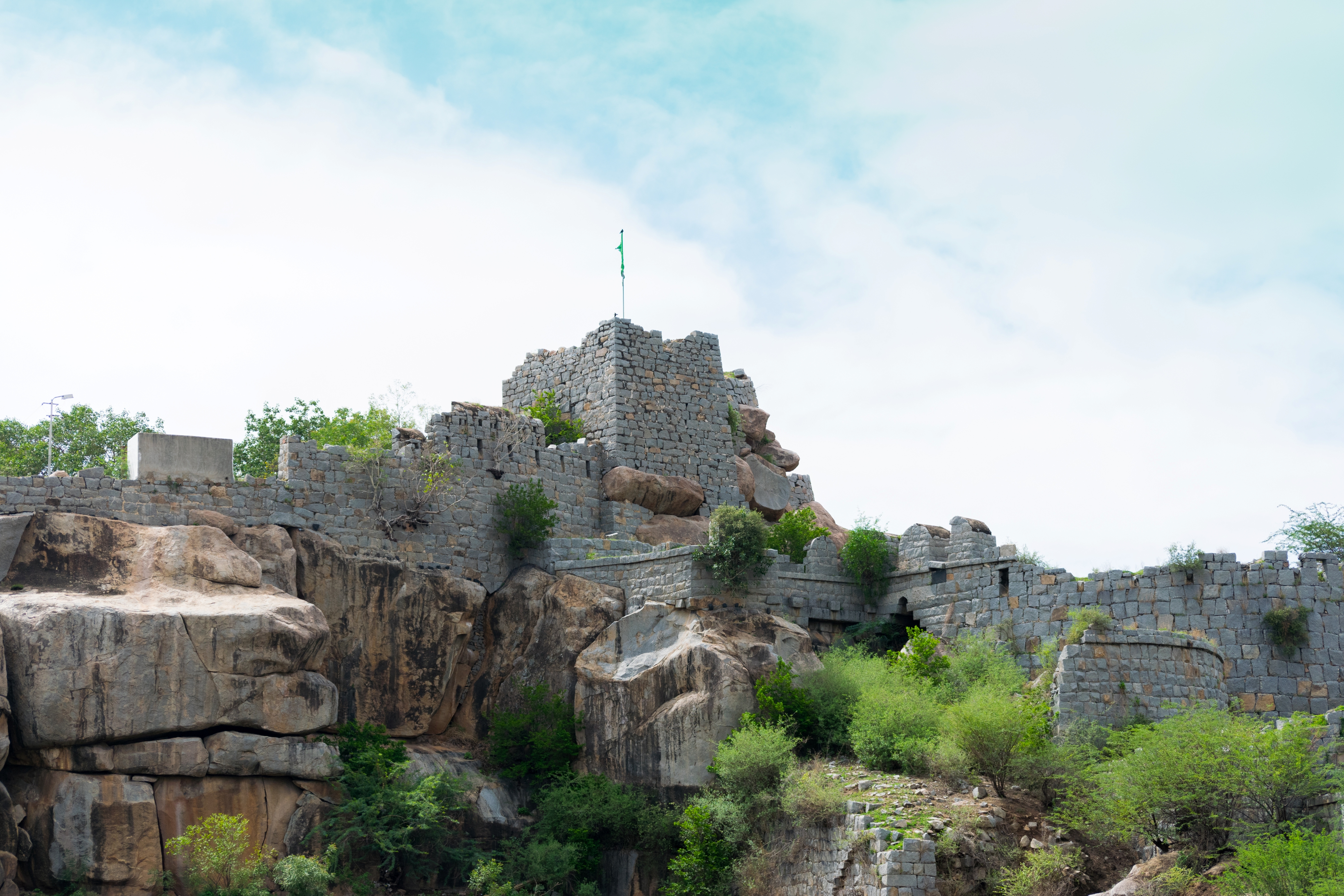
- Raichur Fort
Date	19 May 1520
Location	Raichur, Karnataka, India
Result	Vijaynagar victory: Complete sack and destruction of capital Bijapur

Belligerents
Vijayanagara Empire	Sultanate of Bijapur

Commanders and leaders
Krishnadevaraya; Timmarusu; Pemmasani Ramalinga Nayaka; Timmappa Nayaka; Adapa Nayaka; Kumara Virayya; Ganda Raya	Ismail Adil Shah (surrendered); Mirza Jahangir †; Salabut Khan (POW) (executed); Asada Khan

Strength
Contemporary sources: 132,000; 32,000 cavalry; 550 elephants; Portuguese contingent Another estimate: 30,000 troops Modern estimates: 70,000 infantry; 30,000 cavalry; 550 war elephants	120,000 infantry; 18,000 cavalry; 150 elephants Inside fort: 8,000 infantry; 400 horses; 20 elephants; 30 catapults; 200 Heavy artillery

Casualties and losses
~16,000	~40,000

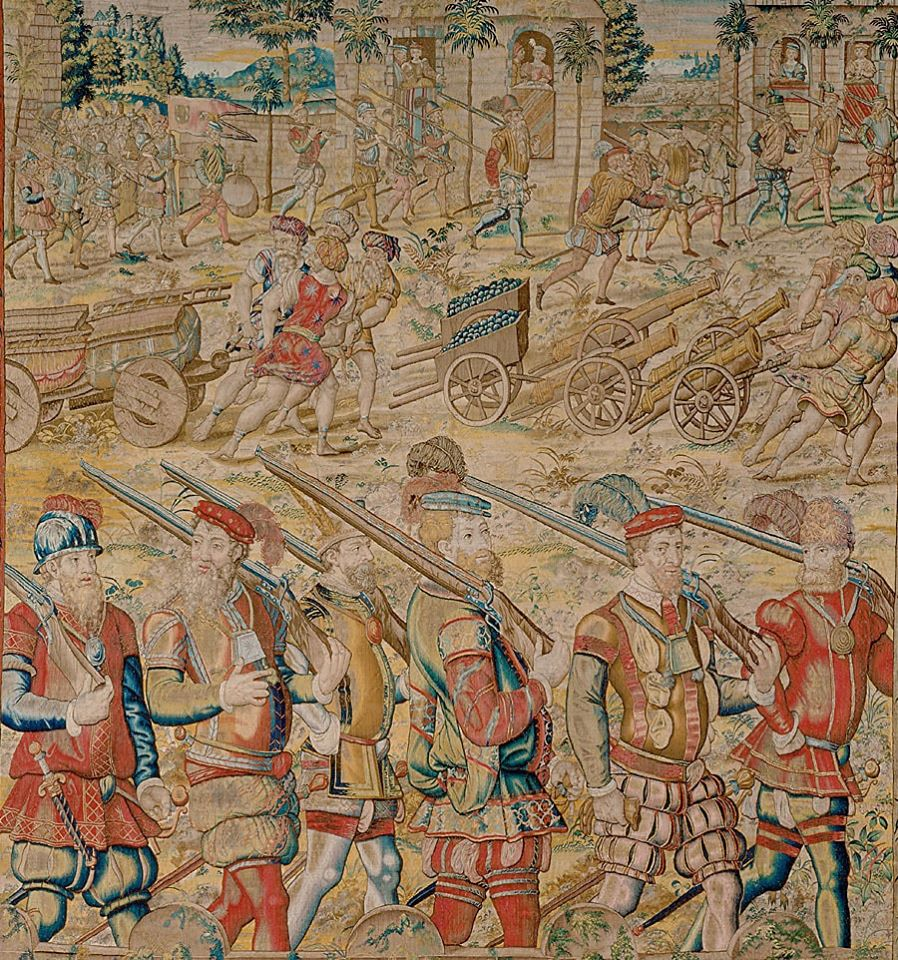
Portuguese Arcabuziers in India, 16th century. D João de Castro Tapestries.

The Battle of Raichur was fought between the Vijayanagara Empire and the Sultanate of Bijapur in 1520 in the town of Raichur, India. It resulted in a decisive victory for Vijayanagara forces, and the Bijapur ruler was defeated and pushed across the river Krishna.

== Background ==
The fort of Raichur was built by Kakatiya king Prataparudra in 1294, and passed on to the Vijayanagara Kingdom after the decline of Kakatiyas. Ever since, the fort had been under dispute for nearly two centuries. The fort, along with other areas of the northern Deccan, was captured by Muhammad Bin Tughluq in 1323. The Bahmani Sultanate captured the fort in 1347. Saluva Narasimha Deva Raya attempted to recapture the city of Raichur from the Bahmanis, but failed. The immediate prelude to the Battle of Raichur began in the year 1520. In that year, Krishnadevaraya sent Seyed Maraikar, a Muslim in his service, to Goa with a large sum of money to buy horses. Maraikar betrayed Krishnadevaraya's cause and went to Adil Khan with the money and offered his services. Krishnadevaraya's demand that Maraikar be returned along with the money was duly refused. During the period of peace Krishnadevaraya made extensive preparations for a grand attack on Raichur Doab.

== Battle ==
The battle was fought in Raichur between the armies of Krishnadevaraya and the Sultanate of Bijapur. The main commander of the Vijayanagara army was Saluva Timmarusu also known as Saluva Timma. The Vijayanagara Empire had a force consisting of 32,600 cavalry and 551 elephants according to contemporary sources. Initially, Pemmasani Ramalinga Nayaka led the vanguard with 30,000 infantry, 1,000 cavalry, and few war elephants. He was followed by commanders like Timmappa Nayaka, Adapa Nayaka, and Ganda Raya, other notable leaders included Jagadeva, Rayachuri Rami Nayudu, and Kumara Virayya. The Bijapur Sultanate had a force consisting of 7,000 cavalry and 250 elephants. Modern and contemporary writers disagree on the number of infantry personnel that each side had. The contemporary sources say that Krishnadevaraya had an infantry force consisting of a bit over 700,000 soldiers. Adil Shah, with a 120,000 foot, 18,000 horses and 150 elephants strong army, moved to relieve Raichur. Despite being outnumbered, his artillery advantage was significant. Upon reaching the Krishna River, he found it blocked by Vijayanagar troops. He then crossed the river and advanced towards Krishna's camp. Both armies prepared for battle and spent a night armed and ready. The next morning, Krishnadeva ordered an attack on the Musalmans, initially making progress but facing heavy artillery fire from the Bijapuris. The Hindu forces retreated in disorder, and Krishnadevaraya rallied his troops to counter-attack, ultimately leading to the enemy's panic and retreat. Krishnadeva, the Vijayanagar leader, encouraged his remaining troops, vowing to die as soldiers instead of fleeing. He called for loyal officers, and together, they charged the enemy. This unexpected counter-attack caused the Bijapuris to retreat, leading to chaos and many casualties on both sides. The Vijayanagar army suffered over 16,000 dead, while the Bijapuris lost many, including Mirza Jehangir, and five important captains including Salabut Khan taken prisoners. Upon seeing the enemy retreat, Krishna's generals sought permission to continue the battle. However, prioritizing peace, he ordered his troops to withdraw. After capturing the Bijapuris' camp, Krishna counted the spoils: 100 elephants, 400 cannons, tents, horses, oxen, and other animals. He released captured women, honored the fallen with funeral rites, and distributed alms. With the battle concluded, Krishna returned to the siege of Raichur. Moreover, the use of a Portuguese contingent commanded by Cristovão de Figueiredo with the use of fireweapons helped to conquer the fortress. There is a high probability that matchlocks, which were obtained through contact with the Portuguese, were used as well by the army of the Vijayanagara Empire. Additionally, the Portuguese with their arquebuses picked off the defenders from the walls, and thus enabled the besiegers to approach close to the lines of fortification and pull down the stones. Driven to desperation, and their governor being slain, the garrison surrendered. Portuguese accounts state that cannons were used extensively by the Bijapur Sultanate; the Vijayanagara Empire used them minimally, at best. The Vijayanagara Empire emerged victorious despite the Bijapur Sultanate having superior firepower.

== Aftermath ==
=== Sack of Bijapur ===
When the city of Raichur surrendered, Krishnadevaraya made a triumphal entry into it. Krishnadevaraya was brutal towards Bijapuri generals of Raichur. Many Bijapuri generals lost their lands. He declared that if Adil Shah would come to him, do obeisance, and kiss his foot, his lands would be restored to him. The submission never took place. Krishnadevaraya then led his army as far north as Bijapur and occupied it. Upon returning to Vijayanagara, Krishnadevaraya received Isma'il Adil Khan's ambassador, who requested the return of captured items, including Raichur fort. Krishnaraya agreed on the condition that Adil Khan would pay homage. The meeting was scheduled at Mudgal, but when Krishnadevaraya arrived, Adil Khan was absent. Enraged, he advanced on Bijapur, Adil Shah fled and Krishnadevaraya occupied the royal palace. Although not intending to sack the city, Bijapur suffered damage.

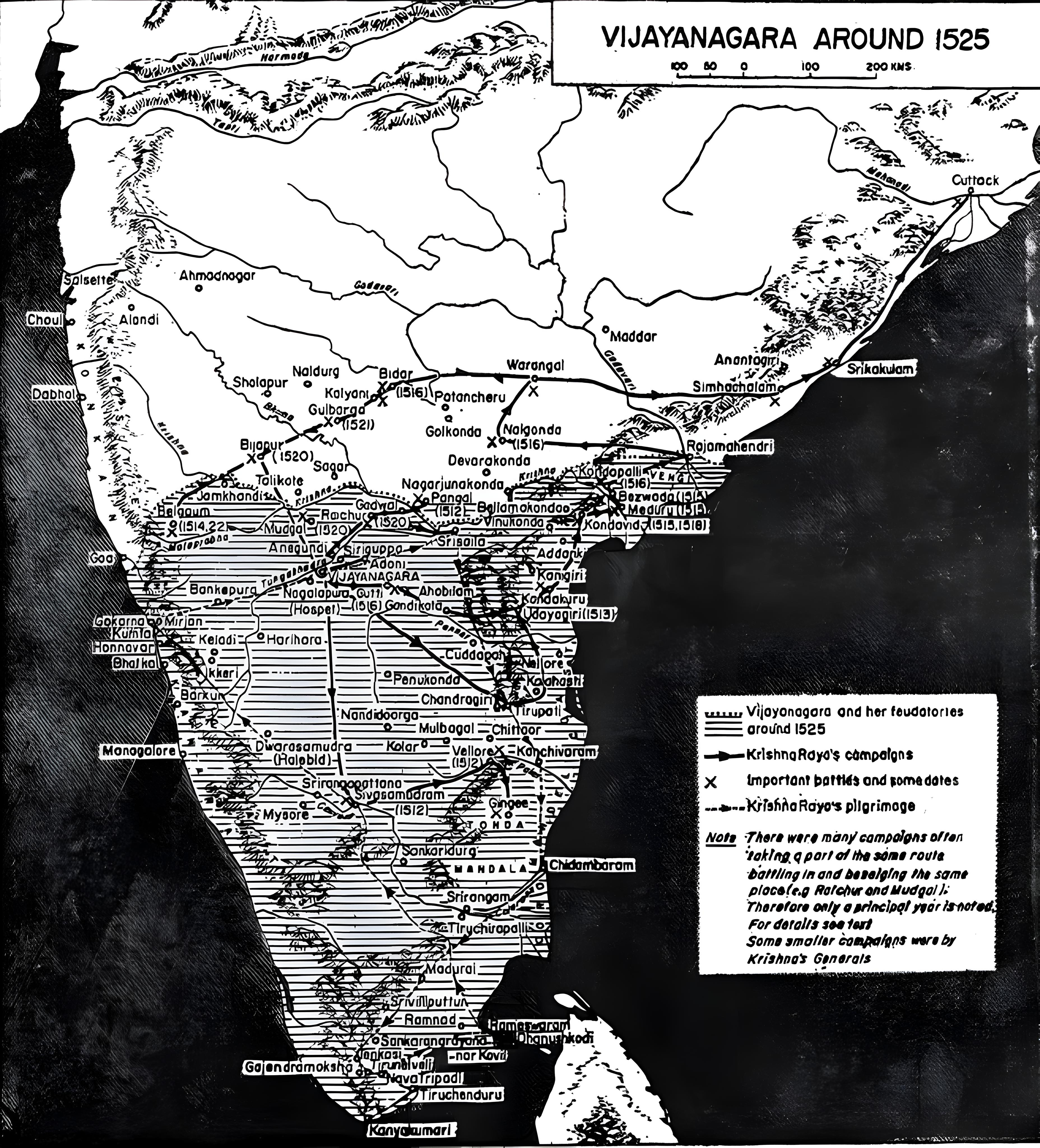
Vijayanagara Empire in 1525

Adil Shah tried to negotiate, but his ambassador, Asad Khan Lari, betrayed him, claiming Salabat Khan's interference for the failed meeting. Believing the lie, Krishnadevaraya ordered Salabat's execution. Asad Khan accomplished his goal and fled.

Infuriated by the ambassador's deceit, Krishnadevaraya invaded Bijapur, causing destruction and capturing some cities. At Sagar, he faced a large army and won a decisive battle with heavy casualties on both sides. Krishnaraya also won battles at Shorapur and Kemba in Kalaburagi district. He took prisoner three sons of a former king of the Bahmani dynasty, who had been held captive by the Adil Shah and he proclaimed the eldest as king of the Deccan. This attempt to subvert the rule of the five Sultans who had established themselves on the ruins of the single Deccan sovereignty only resulted in stiffening their hostility towards their common foe. Krishnadevaraya began to make preparations for an attack on Belgaum, which was in Adil Shah's possession. Soon after, he fell seriously ill to carry out his project and died at the age of forty-five years, in the year 1530. He was succeeded by Achyuta Deva Raya.

== Political consequences ==
Orientalist and nationalist historians claimed the battle as part of a clash of civilizations between Hindus and Muslims. Contemporary scholars reject such characterizations as flawed. The battle of Raichur had far-reaching effects. The Vijayanagara victory weakened the power and prestige of the Adil Shah. He turned his attention to making alliances with the other Muslim neighbours. The victory also caused other Sultans in Deccan to form an alliance to defeat the Vijayanagara Empire. The war also affected the fortunes of the Portuguese on the west coast. Goa rose and fell simultaneously with the rise and fall of the Vijayanagara dynasty because their entire trade depended on Hindu support.

Richard Eaton argues that Vijayanagara's victory at Raichur ultimately led to its downfall. Because Krishna Raya was able to overcome an army with technologically superior weapons, he underestimated the value of investment in military technology. The Sultans of the Deccan, on the other hand, continued to improve their arms and learned the tactics necessary to deploy them well.

== Bibliography ==
- Eaton, Richard M. (2013), "'Kiss My Foot,' Said the King: Firearms, Diplomacy and the Battle for Raichur, 1520", in Richard M. Eaton; Munis D. Faruqui; David Gilmartin; Sunil Kumar (eds.), Expanding Frontiers in South Asian and World History: Essays in Honour of John F. Richards, Cambridge University Press, pp. 275–298, ISBN 978-1-107-03428-0
- Roy, Kaushik (2014), Military Transition in Early Modern Asia, 1400-1750: Cavalry, Guns, Government and Ships, A&C Black, ISBN 978-1-78093-813-4
- Ananda Kumar, P. 2025. Pemmasani Nayaks: Vanguard of Vijayanagara. Ananda Publications, Hyderabad, India.
