= Expedition to Gingee =

- Part of Madurai-Bijapur Conflicts
Date	1662
Location	Tamilnadu, India
Result	Peace Treaty

Belligerents
Madurai Nayakas	Bijapur Sultanate

Commanders and leaders
Lingama Nayaka	Shahaji

Strength
40,000 Infantry; 2,000 Cavalry	80,000 Cavalry

The Expedition to Gingee was a military expedition intiated by the Madurai Nayak kingdom in 1662 against the Bijapur army under Shahaji. Led by Dalavay Lingama Nayaka, the expedition aimed to expel the Bijapur army from the Gingee region and restore Nayak influence in the Carnatic. After Shahaji withdrew to the fort of Arni Lingama Nayaka advanced and laid siege to Tegnapatam. Shahaji then marched with a force reportedly numbering eighty thousand cavalry to relieve the town. Rather than risk a major battle both sides agreed to a negotiated peace settlement bringing the expedition to an end.

== Background ==
By October 1661, Shahaji had captured Porto Novo, which became the base for his operations against the Tanjore Nayaks. His objective was to bring the major port towns of the Coromandel Coast under Bijapur's control and extend the Bijapur Sultanate's influence to the eastern coast.

These ports had previously been administered by Mir Jumla II. However, his defection to the Mughal Empire created a power vacuum in the Carnatic. The Golconda Sultan claimed the territories formerly governed by Mir Jumla II and dispatched officials to take control of them, while the Mughal emperor Aurangzeb ordered the Sultan of Golconda to withdraw his officers from the region. Reluctant to surrender these wealthy coastal towns, the Golconda administration delayed compliance leading to repeated warnings from Aurangzeb. It was only after Aurangzeb had firmly established his authority as Mughal Emperor that Golconda was compelled to relinquish its hold over the Carnatic.

Amid this political uncertainty, Shahaji took advantage of the situation to expand Bijapur Sultanate influence by occupying as many towns as possible.

Chokkanatha Nayak succeeded his father Muttuvirappa Nayaka II at the age of sixteen. Owing to his youth effective power passed into the hands of the kingdom's principal ministers including the Dalavay (commander-in-chief), the Pradhani (chief minister), and the Rayasam (chief secretary). These officials formulated an ambitious policy aimed at launching an offensive against the Bijapur Sultanate and restoring the previous political order in southern India, including the reinstatement of Sriranga III.

== Expedition ==
General Lingama Nayaka was entrusted with leading the campaign. In 1662, he marched with an army numbering forty thousand men to drive Shahaji from Gingee and capture the fortress.

After the formation of an alliance between the Nayak kingdoms of Tanjore and Madurai. From his base at Porto Novo Shahaji launched repeated raids into the Tanjore Nayak kingdom. When Lingama Nayaka advanced against him Shahaji withdrew inland and took refuge in the fortified stronghold of Arni.

During the campaign Antaji Pantulu reportedly offered to hand over Arni to the Madurai Nayak if Lingama Nayaka succeeded in driving Shahaji from the fortress. According to a contemporary Dutch letter, this would have freed most of the Gingee province from Bijapur's control. However, the operation proved to be a difficult undertaking.

Meanwhile, Shahaji's cavalry drew Lingama Nayaka and his army deep into the interior of the Gingee province, disrupting their operations and preventing them from launching an effective offensive. Lingama Nayaka returned toward the coast with the intention of capturing the fort at Tegnapatam one of Shahaji's principal bases of operation. As his forces approached the fort Shahaji arrived with a cavalry force of about eighty thousand men and cut off Lingama's lines of communication forcing him to abandon the siege and prepare for a pitched battle.

Before fighting began however, the two sides chose to negotiate. On 22 September 1661, they concluded an agreement under which Shahaji retained control of Porto Novo and Tegnapatam and agreed to cease his raids into the territories of Tanjore and Madurai. He also agreed to release the son of the Tanjore Nayak, who had been taken captive, in exchange for a ransom of 50,000 rials. When the payment was delayed, Shahaji's cavalry plundered the houses and shops of merchants at Porto Novo causing extensive damage.

Details of the conflict between Madurai and Bijapur are recorded in the following Dutch letters:-

"After spending a short time in his capital, the Neyck of Tansjouwer has left it again and has placed himself under the protection of the Nayak of Madura in the fortress of Siretenapalle ( Trichinopoly ). And after these two rulers had made an alliance, the commander Lingamaneyk has proceeded in the end of June with an army of 40 thousand footmen and 2000 horsemen to Sillenbron, 2 miles south of Porto Novo, where Shahgie was lying in camp and daily robbed the province of Tansjouwer. Before taking up the arms, Lingamaneyk tried to have a conference with him, but seeing that he was short of water, he drove him out from there and from several other castles into the interior. The robber therefore retired to his strong fortress of Arni. The young Amberchan or his tutor Antosie Plontele who is still staying in the capital Singier ( Ginji ) has promised to deliver the castle Ami to the Nayak of Madura, if Shahgie is driven out from there. If this could be done, the bigger part of the province Singier would be freed of the Visiapour Moors. The castle of Tegenepatnam which is also occupied by Sahagie's men has so far been left alone by Lingamaneyk, because he had to follow up Sahagie closely. In the meantime he has written to Governor Pit that as soon as he has driven out Sahagie, he will send forces to Tegenepatnam to release the son of the Nayak of Tansjouwer and two other sons of two Gentu nobles who are being kept there as hostages by Sahagie's men. He promises that he will see to it that our people residing there will not be troubled by the soldiers.

On the other hand, the Governor is afraid that the Moors if they see an army marching against them will pilfer the premises of the Company, especially as they keep a "Champan" ready either to flee if necessary or to abduct the said hostages. Therefore the galleon "Tayoan" will remain for some time in front of Tegenepatnam to safeguard the capital which the Company has got there.

It is apparent that the Ruler of Tansjouwer when he will have completely recovered, will not drop his claim of the balance of the present, although he has not reminded Governor Pit since January last.

Mr. Ranvel Kistapaneyk, ex-regent of Paelesera, has joined Sahagie, but has afterwards left him again and has gone into the forest behind Tegenepatnam, however without joining either of the parties. Therefore the proposal made before to transfer the office of the Company from Tegenepatnam to Poelesera is automatically cancelled, For as long as the Jentus remain masters in the Sigier province and when they have taken the castle of Tegenepatnam, it is best that the residency remains at Tegenepatnam, especiatlly because there is no Government at Poelesera which could protect the Company against possible looting or violence from outside the town.

As soon as Sahagie had been driven back into the interior, people at once noticed more activity in the trade, at Tegenepatnam. The cloths have since been in better supply, On the other hand, the war between Lingamaneyk against Sahagie has caused such a panic in Porto Novo that the leading inhabitants of the country have fled and are staying on the ships, so that perhaps this year nothing will be sent from there to other places. Governor Pit has therefore not been asked yet for passports from Porto Novo to Malacca, Queda and Achin, except by Armocta Chitti for his ship which will sail to Malacca and which passport we shall give him, provided he first pays the Company the value of the goods taken from the stranded jollyboat which he had readily bought from the robbers. The said jolly-boat has got in the sand on the Colleroon riff so badly that nothing can be saved from her anymore. And of the fair things that have been saved, Sahagie would only give 56 pieces of canvas cover, some cooking pots and some lamps."

" The Commander Lingamaneyk, mentioned above, has not made so much progress against Sahagie, as was expected in the beginning. He and his army were led round the whole province of Singier by the cavalry of Sahagie, so that, not being able to pursue him close enough, he had returned in the end to take the castle of Tegenepatnam. But when he had approached to the ditch, Sahagie appeared with 8,000 horsemen and cut off the communications of his enemy, so that Lingamaneyk was forced to break up the siege and to resist Sahagie. But later on, on the 2nd September the two parties made an agreement that Sahagie would retain the countries which he has possessed before, viz., Porto Novo and Tegenapatnam till further orders from the king of Visiapore and that he would no longer do any damage in the countries of Tanasjouwer and Madura; and that he would release the son of the Neyk of Tansjouwer r provided the father would pay 50 thousand Rials. The Neyks of Tansjouwer and Madura who were displeased with this contract imprisoned Lingamaneyk in the castle Tritsienapille ( Trichinopoly. ) with the intentions of making further war against Sahagie. But after thinking matters over, the Neyk of Madura released him and gave him nice presents. The Neyk of Tansjouwer joined in this, the contract was confirmed and until further confirmation lit was arranged that the Neyk of Tansjouwer would marry the daughter of Lingamaneyk and that Lingamaneyk would marry the sister of the Neyk. Whereupon Lingamaneyk went to his master, the Neyk of Madura and left his servant behind with 3000 men to receive the said 50 thousand Rials* But afterwards he received a letter from Antosie Pontele that Sahagie would not wait for the money any longer and had therefore broken the contract. This meant that they were again up against each other. Before Lingamaneyk had come near the castle Tegenepatnam, the men from the castle had been twice in Porto Novo, had looted the town and driven the inhabitants into the country and dispersed them. Seeing how many troubles the Company had to go through in this heavy war, Governor Pit had ordered the residents that they would embark with the valuable merchandise in the gallot Tayoan which was lying in the roadstead for that purpose, and that if the troubles would not have ceased on the 25th September they should go to Palleacattc, leaving the premises for a short time under protection of the Company's soldiers. But if peace had been concluded, this would not been necessary. They had already loaded some of the merchandise in the said Gallot, but had unloaded it again. Sahagie is very much satisfied that we have remained neutral in this affair."

== See also ==
- Golconda Sultanate
- Dutch East India company
- Parangipettai
