= Ibrahim Adil Shah I =

Sultan of Bijapur from 1535 to 1558

Ibrahim Adil Shah Buzurg

4th Sultan of Bijapur
- Reign: 21 March 1535 – September 1558
- Predecessor: Mallu Adil Shah
- Successor: Ali Adil Shah I
- Born: Bijapur
- Died: September 1558; Bijapur
- Burial: 1558; In the campus of the Great Sufi Saint Chandah Husaini of Gogi, Shahpur, District Gulbarga, next to his father and grandfather.
- Spouse: Khusrow-un-nisa begum (daughter of Asad Khan Lari); Rabiya Sultana (daughter of Aladdin Imad Shah)
- Issue: Ismail; Ali Adil Shah I; Tahmasp; Ahmed; Saani Bibi (wife of Ali Barid Shah I); Hadiya Sultana (wife of Murtaza Nizam Shah I)
Names
- Sultan Abul Nasser Ibrahim Adil Shah
- Dynasty: Adil Shahi Empire
- Father: Ismail Adil Shah
- Mother: Fatima Beebi
- Religion: Sunni Islam

Ibrahim Adil Shah I (Persian: ابراهیم عادل شاه; died September 1558) was sultan of the Indian Sultanate of Bijapur. He succeeded his elder brother, Mallu Adil Shah, through the machinations of the Afaqi faction at the court. He was the first Adil Shahi ruler to assume the royal title of Shah.

== Faith ==
Having a strong penchant for Sunni Islam, the religion of most Deccani Muslims—on his accession he deleted the names of the twelve Shi'ah Imams from the Khutbah (Friday prayer sermon), discontinued previous Shia practices and restored the exercise of the Sunni Islamic practices. He deviated from the traditions of his predecessors and introduced many innovations in the political and religious policies. He degraded most of the afaqi faction (with a few exceptions), and in their place enrolled the Deccani (including the Marathas and Habashis) to the services, retaining only four hundred afaqi troops as his bodyguard. Consequently, he brought Sunni Muslims to power and ended Shia domination by dismissing them from their posts and many Marathas acquired great influence at his court and public accounts began to be maintained in Marathi.

== Policies ==
Ibrahim's anti-afaqi policy, however, considerably weakened the kingdom as the dismissed personnel joined the service of the neighbouring rulers. This exposed the kingdom to a series of invasions. Yet it was the veteran afaqi leader Asad Khan Lari (buried in Belgaum), who acting as a diplomatic counselor to Ibrahim, saved the kingdom in the hour of crisis.

== Reign ==
The reign of Ibrahim, which lasted twenty-four years and a few months, was full of alliances and counter-alliances with and against Ahmadnagar, Bidar, Berar, Golkonda and Vijayanagar. Although there were continuous expeditions, little territorial expansion was made, for gains in one direction were compensated by loss on the other side. Thus while Bidar was conquered, Solapur and Kalyani were lost to Ahmadnagar. On the other hand, considerable acquisitions were made in the south along the west coast. The farthest point of Bijapur territory now extended south of Goa. Further, though Golkonda was not subdued, the Bijapur army was able to reach the walls of Golkonda fort and return triumphantly.

== Death ==
Ibrahim was buried near the famous Sufi saint Chandah Hussaini Ashrafi in Gogi, where his father, Ismail and grandfather Yusuf were also buried. On his mausoleum is an inscription of the names of Allah, Muhammad, the Rashidun Caliphs, and other Sahaba.

== See also ==
- Adil Shahi–Portuguese conflicts

Preceded by Mallu Adil Shah	Adil Shahi Rulers of Bijapur; 1534–1558	Succeeded by Ali Adil Shah I
