= Ismail Adil Shah =

Sultan of Bijapur from 1510 to 1534

2nd Sultan of Bijapur
- Reign: 5 December 1510 – 27 August 1534
- Predecessor: Yusuf Adil Shah
- Successor: Mallu Adil Shah
- Born: 1498; Bijapur
- Died: 27 August 1534 (aged 35–36); Sagar
- Burial: 1534; Campus of Great Sufi Saint Chandah Husaini of Gogi, Shahpur, District Gulbarga next to his father.
- Spouse: Fatima Bibi
- Issue: Alamshah; Mallu Adil Shah; Ibrahim Adil Shah I
Names
- Sultan Abul Fatah Ismail Adil
- Dynasty: Adil Shahi
- Father: Yusuf Adil Shah
- Mother: Bubuji Khanum
- Religion: Shia Islam

Ismail Adil Shah (1498 – 27 August 1534) was the Sultan of Bijapur in western Deccan and South India. He spent most of his time extending his territory. His reign helped the dynasty establish a stronghold in the Deccan.

== Early life ==
Ismail Adil Shah succeeded his father Yusuf Adil Shah as the king of Bijapur as a minor. Affairs of state were managed by minister Kamal Khan until he matured. During this phase, Khan imprisoned the king and attempted a coup. Ismail's mother, Punji Khatun, hatched a counter-plot and Kamal Khan was stabbed to death in the royal palace.

After the death of Kamal Khan, his son Ismail Khan laid siege to the palace in order to arrest Punji Khatun and Ismail Adil Shah. However, Ismail Khan was killed in the fight. Ismail Adil Shah started to manage the affairs of state with the help of his mother. Ismail was a follower of Shiah faith and declared it to be the faith of the state.

== Ruler ==
=== War with Vijaynagar empire ===
He was defeated by the Emperor of Vijaynagar Empire, Krishnadevraya, in the Battle of Raichur in 1520.

=== Conquest of Bidar ===
He later invaded Kasim-Barid of Bidar. Kasmim Barid with the Muslim kings of Ahmednagar, Golconda and Berar invaded Bijapur, however, Ismail Adil Shah was able to defend his territory. In this battle, Mahmud Shah of Bidar and his son Ahmed were taken as prisoners.

Bibi Satti, the sister of Ismail Adil Shah married Ahmed Shah of Ahmednagar, which ended the hostilities.

Ismail waged war against Nizam Shah of Ahmednagar, who did not aid Ashad Khan during his conquest against Timraj of Vijayanagar. Nizam Shah was unhappy because he was promised the fort of Sholapur as dowry when he married Ismail's sister Mariam, but the dowry was never delivered. Nizam Shah later tried to take Sholapur by force. However, he had to taste failure when Ismail marched and captured forty elephants.

=== Dynasty ===
Ismail invaded Bidar. While Kutubshah was coming to help Amir Birad, Ismail sent his trusted General Asad Kahan to obstruct Kutubshah, which he did successfully and later captured Amir Birad who was drunk. In a treaty Amir Birad agreed to give Humnabad and Bidar. He entered the fort of Bidar with pomp and seated himself on the throne, his father's throne. After a while, Amir Birad regained the favour of Ismail Adil Shah who returned the fort.

Ismail Adil Shah seldom faced defeat and his army with the artillery was a force to reckon with.

== Death ==
During his campaign against the Golconda Sultanate he fell ill and died in 1534 A.D. He was buried at the Gogi village. A mahal and a mosque are ascribed to him. After his death his eldest son Mallu was crowned. However, he was deposed through the efforts of his grandmother and General Asad Khan. His younger brother Ibrahim Adil Shah I was then declared king.

== See also ==
- Adil Shahi–Portuguese conflicts

| Preceded by Yusuf Adil Shah | Adil Shahi Rulers of Bijapur; 1511–1534 | Succeeded by Mallu Adil Shah |
