= Raichur Doab =

Triangular region of land in India

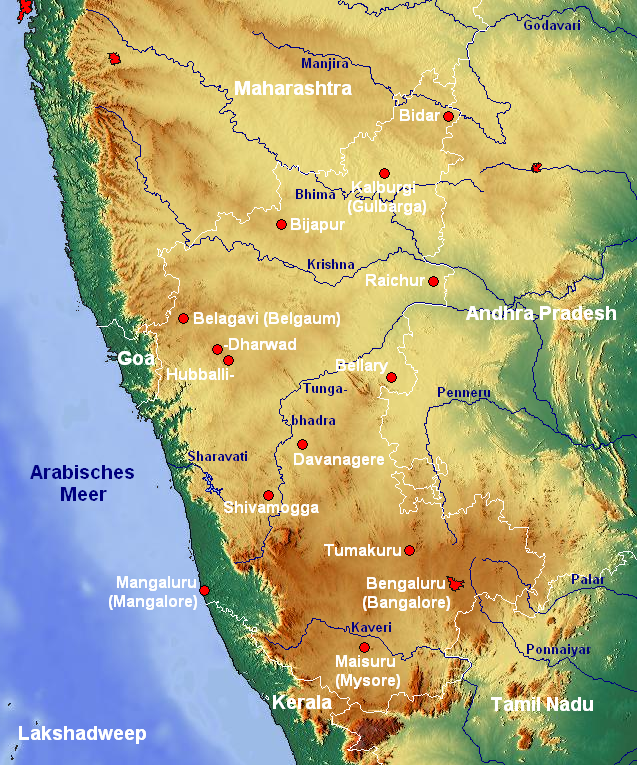

The Raichur Doab is a Doab, in this case the triangular region of land in the southern Indian states of Telangana and Karnataka lying between the Krishna River and its tributary, the Tungabhadra River. The doab is named for the town of Raichur in the Raichur District. The Raichur Doab is considered to be very fertile because of the sediments carried by Krishna and Tungabhadra rivers. The doab includes Raichur district and Koppal district in Karnataka, and Gadwal district in Telangana. Some areas of Raichur doab also called as Nadigadda region became a part of Telangana during Andhra Pradesh Reorganisation Act in 2014.Those areas are Gadwal, Alampur and Maganoor. Gadwal is one of the 31 districts of Telangana State.

== Resources ==
Hatti Gold Mines: Situated in Hatti of Lingasugur taluk, is currently the only working gold mine in India. Evidently, it is one of the oldest mines dating back to Pre Ashokan times. During late 19th century, the gold mines were rediscovered.

Raichur Thermal Power Station at Deosugur, commissioned in 1986 was the first coal fired thermal electric power station to be established in the state. It accounts for 40% of electricity, generated in Karnataka.

== Agriculture ==
Raichur Doab has the fertile tracts of deposits from Krishna River and its tributary Tungabhadra.

Sindhanur and Gangavati along with Siruguppa produces largest amount of paddies in Karnataka.

Raichur district ranks first in Mosambi /Sweet Lime production in the state.

== Geography ==
The doab, named after Raichur is formed by Krishna River in the North and Tungabhadra River in the South. It lies within the Deccan Plateau region of Bayalu Seeme.

== History ==
Raichur Doab is inhabited since the Prehistoric cultures. The early village settlements during the Neolithic and Iron Age are base for sedentary lifestyles in Raichur Doab, and they exhibit rich faunal ecology of the region through rock art. During ancient period, the region was part of Maurya Empire as its southern capital was Kanakagiri.

An edict of emperor Ashoka discovered in the town of Maski, was an important discovery as it solved the mystery of the title 'devanampriya' which was found in many inscriptions scattered throughout the subcontinent. The Maski edict had the name of Ashoka written along 'devanampriya' (Beloved of the Gods).

After Mauryan Empire, the doab came under the control of Shatavahana dynasty which ruled over central and eastern Deccan. Later in the early medieval period, Chalukyas of Badami, Rashtrakutas and Kalyani Chalukyas ruled over the Raichur doab region.In the subsequent centuries, the region was ruled by Kakatiyas of Warangal and Hoysalas before being conquered and annexed by the Delhi Sultanate.

As Bahmani Sultanate was established at Gulbarga in 1347 AD, the region of Raichur doab was fiercely contested and bloody battles were fought over the forts of Mudgal and Raichur between the Bahmanis and Vijayanagar Empire. Forces of Vijayanagar empire under Krishnadevaraya won the decisive Battle of Raichur in 1520 CE against Sultanate of Bijapur, and pushed across the Krishna river. But these short-term gains were decisively reversed when a confederate alliance of Deccan Sultanates defeated the Vijayanagar empire at Battle of Talikota in 1565 CE.

During late 17th century, the region came under the Mughal Empire and then passed into the rule of their successors under Nizam of Hyderabad. It remained under the Hyderabad State until 1948 when the princely state was annexed by the Indian Union.

During reorganisation of states on linguistic basis in 1956, the eastern part of the doab, Gadwal was incorporated in the state of Andhra Pradesh (currently in Telangana). The remaining part of the doab that formed Raichur district was incorporated in Mysore State (Renamed as Karnataka in 1973). In 1998, a new district of four talukas was formed with Koppal as administrative headquarter.
