= Yusuf Adil Shah =

Sultan of Bijapur from 1490 to 1510

- Emir
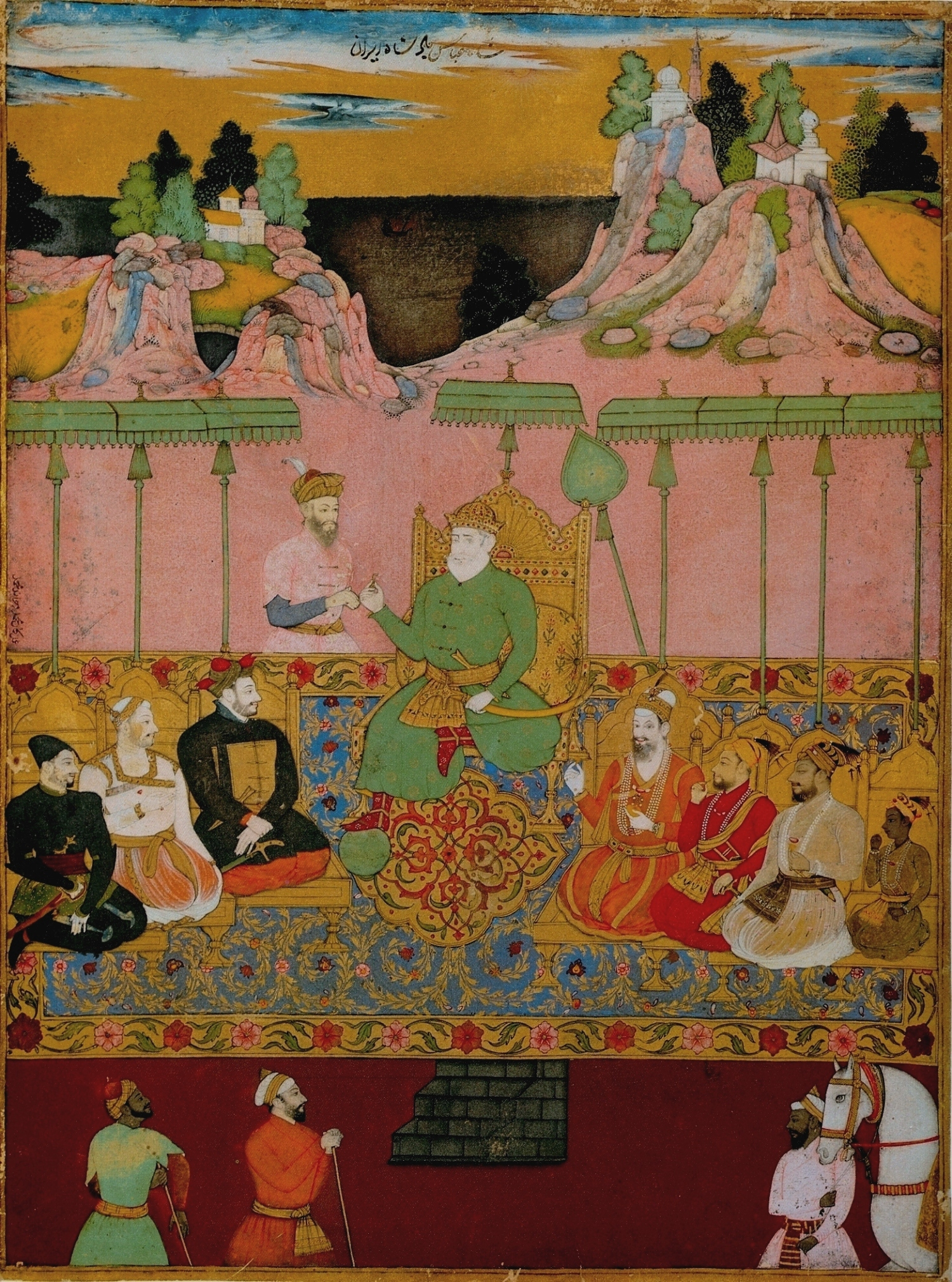
- Painting created c. 1680 in Bijapur. Yusuf Adil Shah, shown seated, is being handed the key of legitimacy by Shah Ismail I of the Safavid Dynasty, symbolizing the unwavering allegiance of the Adil Shahi family to the Twelver Shia creed of Islam. All nine Adil Shahi sultans are depicted in the painting in a dynastic assembly probably inspired by Mughal paintings.

1st Sultan of Bijapur
- Reign: August/September 1490 – 5 December 1510
- Predecessor: Position established
- Successor: Ismail Adil Shah
- Born: 1450
- Died: 5 December 1510 (aged 59–60); Koilkonda, Telangana
- Burial: 1510
- Spouse: Bubuji Khanum
- Issue: Ismail Adil Shah; Mariam Sultan; Khadija Sultan; Bibi Sati
Names
- Abul Muzaffar Yusuf Adil Shah Safavi
- Dynasty: Adil Shahi dynasty
- Religion: Shia Islam
- Military career
- Allegiance: Bahmani Sultanate (1481–1490); Bijapur Sultanate (1490–1510)
- Service years: 1481–1510
- Conflicts: See list: Manvi (1493); Anjadiva (1506); Goa (1510); Deccan (1509–10); Koilkonda (1510) †

Yusuf Adil Shah (1450 – 5 December 1510), referred as Yusuf Adil Khan or Hidalcão by the Portuguese, was the founder of the Adil Shahi dynasty that ruled the Sultanate of Bijapur for nearly two centuries. As the founder of the Adil Shahi dynasty, Yusuf Adil Shah is credited with developing the town of Bijapur and elevating it to significant status.

== Legends of origin ==
Yusuf Adil Shah may have been a Georgian slave who was purchased by Mahmud Gawan. Other historians mentioned him of Persian or Turkmen origin. According to the narrative presented by contemporary historian Firishta, Yusuf was a son of the Ottoman Sultan Murad II, although this is considered unfounded by modern historians. Another theory states he was a Turkman of the Aq-Quyunlu.

== Career ==
Yusuf's bravery and personality raised him rapidly in the Bahmani sultan's favor, and resulted in his appointment as Governor of Daulatabad. The Bahmani Sultanate's last major sultan, Mahmood Shah Bahmani II, gave him the title Adil Khan for his efforts. He was later widely regarded as Yusuf Adil Khan. He was also the leader of the foreigners, or Afaqis in the conflict between them and the Deccanis (local nobility) which resulted in the murder of Prime minister Mahmud Gawan in 1481. Following his execution, Yusuf vacated his position as Governor of Daulatabad to seize the former territories held by Mahmud Gawan of Bijapur and Belgaum. He would come in great conflict soon after this with his enemy, Malik Naib, leader of the Deccani party.

In 1489, Yusuf took advantage of the decline of Bahmani power to establish himself as an independent sultan at Bijapur. He waged war against the Vijayanagar empire, as also against Bijapur's Muslim neighbours.

Yusuf Adil Shah is personally responsible for building the imposing citadel or Arkilla and the palace named Faroukh Mahal. Yusuf was a man of culture and invited poets and artisans from Persia, Turkey and Rome to his court. He was also an accomplished musician and scholar with deep religious tolerance that was reflected in art and architecture from this time.

Both Yusuf and his son Ismail did not use the title Adil Shah in front of their name, and instead used Adil Khan to respect the Bahmanis, who used Shah in their names. Ibrahim Adil Shah I formally claimed the Bijapur sultanate's independence from the Bahmanis in 1538, although it had been in practice independent since 1490, and became the first ruler in the Bijapur Sultanate to use Adil Shah in his name.

== Death ==
He was killed in the Battle of Koilkonda against Vijayanagara on 5 December 1510, shortly after the loss of Goa to the Portuguese governor Afonso de Albuquerque a few days prior. He was succeeded by his son Ismail Adil Shah, who being a minor, was aided in his rule by a certain Kamal Khan.

Yusuf left behind a strong if small state, one which persisted through two relatively chaotic centuries in a region rife with political ferment. The Bijapur sultanate he founded was a formidable force for close to two centuries until it succumbed to Maratha power and finally resolved by Aurangzeb in 1686 in an ineffective bid to check Maratha power.

== Family ==
Yusuf Adil Shah married Poonji (Punji), the sister of a Maratha lord Mukundrao Kadam, later renamed Bubuji Khanum. By this marriage he had a son and three daughters:

- Ismail Adil Shah, Sultan of Bijapur;
- Mariam Sultan, married Burhan Nizam Shah I, Sultan of Ahmednagar;
- Khadija Sultan, married Aladdin Imad Shah, Sultan of Berar;
- Bibi Sati, married Ahmad Shah, son of Mahmood Shah Bahmani II;

== See also ==
- Adil Shahi–Portuguese conflicts

== Bibliography ==
- Farooqui, Salma Ahmed (2011), A Comprehensive History of Medieval India: Twelfth to the Mid-Eighteenth Century, Pearson Education India, ISBN 978-81-317-3202-1
- Haig, Wolseley (1925). Cambridge History Of India Vol. 2. Cambridge University Press.
- Majumdar, R.C. (1974). "The Five Sultanates of the Deccan". The Mughul Empire. Bharatiya Vidya Bhavan.
- Nilakanta Sastri, K. A. (1958) [first published 1955], A History of South India from Prehistoric Times to the Fall of Vijayanagar (Second ed.), New Delhi: Oxford University Press, ISBN 0-19-560686-8 – via archive.org
- Sherwani, Haroon Khan (1973). History of Medieval Deccan (1295–1724) : Volume I. Government of Andhra Pradesh.

Preceded by Founder of the Dynasty	Adil Shahi Rulers of Bijapur; 1489–1511	Succeeded by Ismail Adil Shah
