= Mallu Adil Shah =

Sultan of Bijapur from 1534 to 1535

3rd Sultan of Bijapur
- Reign: 27 August 1534 – February 1535
- Predecessor: Ismail Adil Shah
- Successor: Ibrahim Adil Shah I
- Born: Bijapur
- Died: February 1535; Bijapur
- Burial: 1535; Bijapur
Names
- Mallu Adil Khan
- Dynasty: Adil Shahi Empire
- Father: Ismail Adil Shah
- Mother: Fatima Beebi
- Religion: Sunni Islam

Mallu Adil Shah, of the Adil Shahi dynasty, was the Sultan of the Bijapur Sultanate of modern-day southern India. He ruled for a short period in 1534, before being deposed and blinded.

== Reign ==
Mallu Adil Shah succeeded his father Ismail Adil Shah upon the latter's death. He was supposed to be in the company of evil habits. Punji Khatun, Mallu Adil Shah's paternal grandmother with the help of General Asad Khan deposed Mallu Adil Shah and declared his younger brother Ibrahim Adil Shah I as the king.
