= Bijapur Sultanate =

Indian kingdom in the Deccan (1490–1686)

- 1490–1686
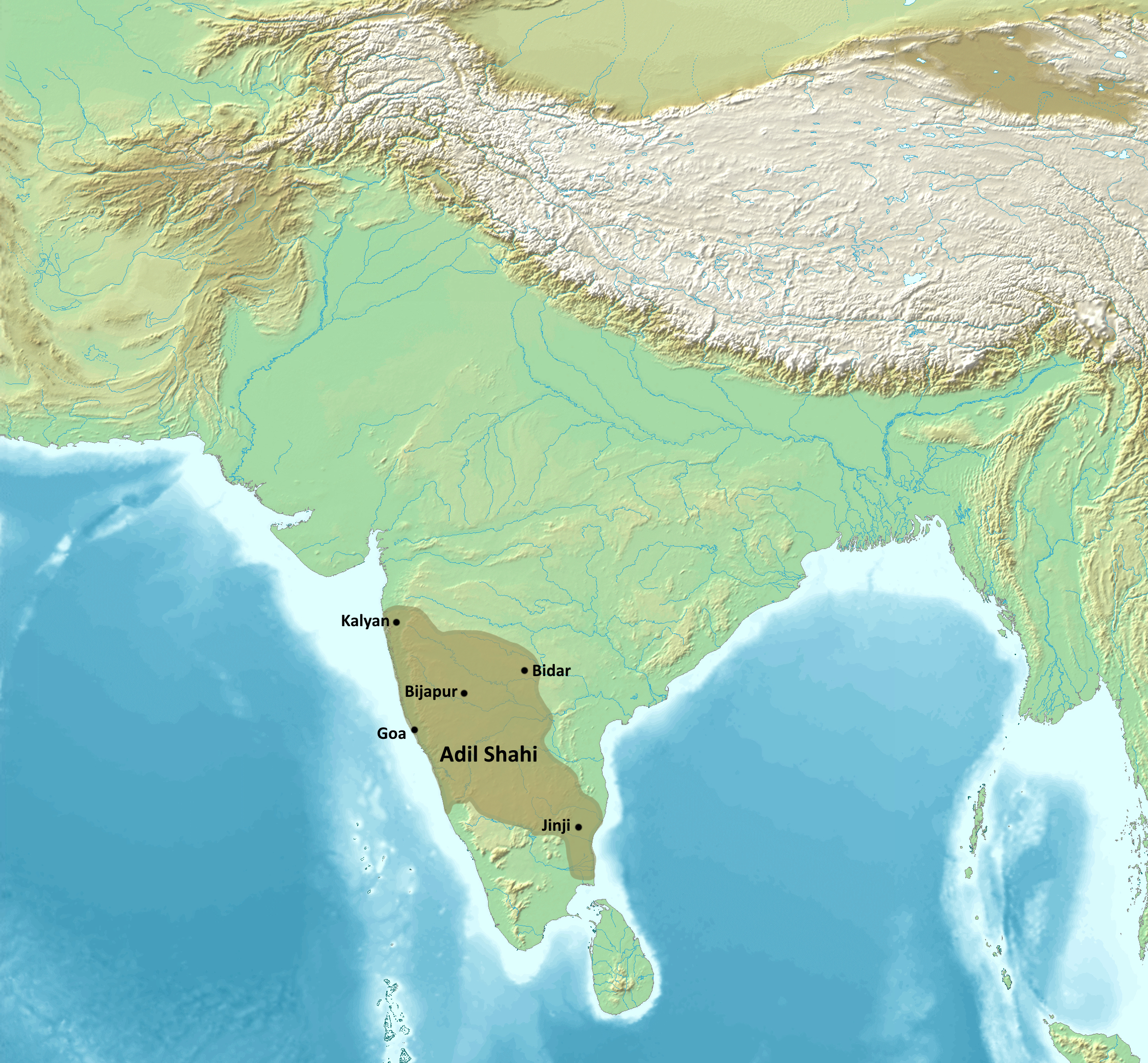
- Map of the Adil Shahi dynasty of the Bijapur Sultanate at its greatest extent
- Capital: Bijapur
- Official languages: Persian
- Common languages: Deccani (Note: After 1535); Kannada; Marathi (Note: Written only, for local government)
- Religion: State religion: Shia Islam (1502–34 and 1558–83); Sunni Islam (1490–1502, 1534–58, after 1583); Other: Other religions in South Asia
- Government: Monarchy
- Sultan
  - 1490–1510: Yusuf Adil Shah (first)
  - 1672–1686: Sikandar Adil Shah (last)
- Historical era: Early modern
  - Established: 1490
  - Disestablished: 1686
Preceded by
| Bahmani Sultanate |
Succeeded by
| Mughal Empire |
| Portuguese India |
| Maratha Empire |
- Today part of: India

The Bijapur Sultanate was an early modern sultanate located in the southwestern Deccan, ruled by the Adil Shahi dynasty. (Note: Persian: عادل شاهیان, romanized: ādil shāhiyān) One of the five Deccan sultanates, Bijapur had originally been a taraf (province) of the Bahmani Sultanate prior to its independence in 1490 and before the kingdom's political decline in the last quarter of the 15th century. The Sultanate of Bijapur was one of the most powerful states in the Indian subcontinent at its peak, second to the Mughal Empire which conquered it in 1686 under Aurangzeb.

After emigrating to the Bahmani Sultanate, Yusuf Adil Shah rose through the ranks to be appointed governor of the province of Bijapur. In 1490, he created a de facto independent Bijapur state which became formally independent with the Bahmani collapse in 1518.

The Bijapur Sultanate's borders changed considerably throughout its history. Its northern boundary remained relatively stable, straddling contemporary southern Maharashtra and northern Karnataka. The sultanate expanded southward, its first major conquest the Raichur Doab after defeating the Vijayanagara Empire at the Battle of Talikota in 1565. Later campaigns in the Karnatak and Carnatic extended Bijapur's borders and nominal authority as far south as Tanjore. For most of its history, Bijapur was bounded on the west by the Portuguese state of Goa, on the east by the Golconda Sultanate, on the north by the Ahmednagar Sultanate and on the south by the Vijayanagara Empire and its succeeding Nayaka dynasties.

The sultanate clashed incessantly with its neighbours. After the allied victory against Vijayanagara at Talikota in 1565, the state expanded through its conquest of the neighbouring Bidar Sultanate in 1619. The sultanate was then relatively stable, although it was damaged by the revolt of Shivaji (who founded an independent Maratha kingdom which become the Maratha Confederacy). From the late 16th century, the greatest threat to Bijapur's security was the expansion of the Mughal Empire into the Deccan. Agreements and treaties imposed Mughal suzerainty on the Adil Shahs, by stages, until Bijapur's formal recognition of Mughal authority in 1636. The influence of their Mughal overlords and continual strife with the Marathas sapped the state of prosperity until the Mughal conquest of Bijapur in 1686.

The former Bahmani provincial capital of Bijapur remained the sultanate's capital throughout its existence. After modest earlier developments, Ibrahim Adil Shah I and Ali Adil Shah I remodelled Bijapur with a citadel, city walls, and a congregational mosque. Their successors, Ibrahim Adil Shah II, Mohammed Adil Shah and Ali Adil Shah II, added palaces, mosques, a mausoleum and other structures (considered some of the finest examples of Deccani and Indo-Islamic architecture) to the capital.

== History ==
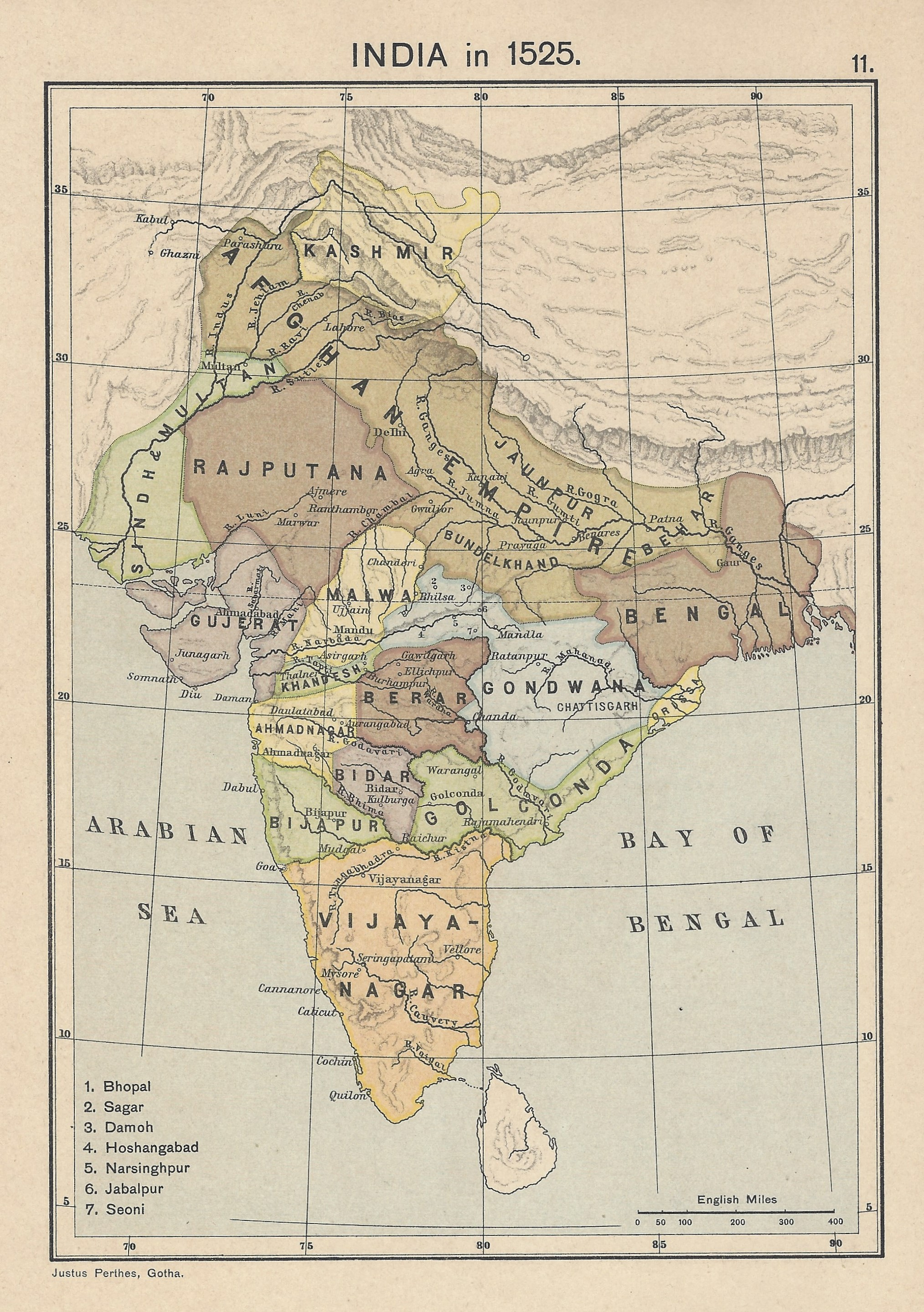
India and the Deccan sultanates in 1525; the Sultanate of Bijapur is center-left.

The founder of the dynasty, Yusuf Adil Shah, may have been a Georgian slave who was purchased by the Bahmani statesman Mahmud Gawan. Other historians have said that he was of Persian or Turkoman origin. According to the contemporary historian Firishta, Yusuf was a son of the Ottoman sultan Murad II; however, this is disputed by modern historians. Another theory is that he was an Aq Qoyunlu Turkoman.

=== Founding and consolidation (1490–1580) ===
Yusuf impressed the Bahmani sultan Muhammad Shah III, and he was appointed governor of Bijapur. Yusuf took advantage of Bahmani decline to establish himself as an independent sultan at Bijapur in 1490, pursuing the same goal Malik Ahmad Nizam Shah I had that year. He proclaimed Shi'a Islam as the official religion of his territorial holdings in 1503, following the lead of Isma'il I of the Safavid dynasty. Yusuf conquered and annexed the Bahmani taraf of Gulbarga the following year and reinstated Shia Islam in his realm shortly afterwards, a year after he revoked it under threat of invasion from his neighbours. A Portuguese Empire colonial expedition led by Afonso de Albuquerque exerted pressure on the major Adil Shahi port of Goa, conquering it in 1510; Yusuf retook the settlement two months later, but the Portuguese again conquered it in November of that year.

Yusuf died in 1510, between these two clashes with the Portuguese, when his son Isma'il Adil Shah (Note: Yusuf and his son, Ismail, generally used the title Adil Khan. "Khan" ("chief" in a number of Central Asian cultures and adopted in Persia) conferred lower status than "Shah", which indicated royal rank. With the rule of Yusuf's grandson, Ibrahim Adil Shah I (r. 1534–1558), the title "Adil Shah" became common, but Bijapur rulers recognized Safavid Persian suzerainty over their realm.) was a boy. Ismail's regent, Kamal Khan, staged an unsuccessful coup against him; he was killed, and Ismail became the absolute ruler of Bijapur. In 1514, a dispute over Gulbaraga province led the rulers of the Ahmednagar, Golconda, and Bidar Sultanates to unsuccessfully invade Ismail Adil Shah's provinces. Krishnadevaraya, ruler of Vijayanagara, laid siege to the Bijapuri fort of Raichur in 1520. The siege continued for three months until the emperor's encounter with Ismail, who attempted to end it. Ismail was defeated by Krishnadevaraya in the Battle of Raichur; initially successful, with an advantage in artillery (in its first major appearance in a South Asian battle), Ismail was routed by the Vijayanagara forces in a surprise counter-attack which scattered much of his forces. Soon after Ismail's retreat, Krishnadevaraya captured the Raichur fort. In a later diplomatic conflict, Krishnadevaraya occupied Bijapur for an extended period and the sultan refused to see him. Ismail invaded the territory of Amir Barid I of Bidar in 1529, besieging his capital; Aladdin Imad Shah of Berar unsuccessfully tried to mediate the conflict. Amir Barid surrendered the fort of Bidar, which was looted by Ismail and his troops. Ismail recaptured Raichur and Mudgal from Vijayanagara the following year, after the death of Krishnadevaraya. Amir Barid agreed with Ismail to cede him the forts of Kalyani and Qandhar in exchange for Ismail's surrender of Bidar.

Ismail was succeeded in 1534 by Mallu Adil Shah, whose reign was short-lived. Installed by a prominent Bijapuri noble, Asad Khan, he is noted for incompetence; Vijayanagara invaded the sultanate and seize the Raichur Doab from the Adil Shahis. Mallu Adil Shah was soon blinded and removed from power.

Ibrahim Adil Shah I, Ismail's son, succeeded Mallu the following year. He established Sunni Islam as the state religion and made anti-Westerner changes, (Note: The "Westerners", also known as the gharibs or afaqis, were a faction in the Deccani and Bahmani courts of anyone not native to the subcontinent ("west" of it) and were typically Persian-speaking and Shia Muslim.) abolishing the use of Persian in some administrative tasks (although it remained the sultanate's official language) and replacing many Westerners with Deccanis. Ibrahim also invaded the Vijayanagara Empire; he pillaged a number of cities and besieged the capital, Vijayanagara, but did not seize any territory in the long term and returned home with only non-territorial rewards. In another conflict with the Portuguese, Ibrahim ceded two ports in the fear that trade through Goa might be cut off from the Adil Shahis. His kingdom was invaded four times by Ahmednagar Sultanate forces, the sultanate's greatest adversary. Sultan Burhan Nizam Shah I initially allied himself with Bidar in his first invasion (which saw no territorial losses for Bijapur) but Bidar, ruled by Ali Barid Shah I, allied itself with Bijapur in the second invasion: a quadruple alliance of Ahmednagar, Jamsheed Quli Qutb Shah of Golconda, Vijayanagara, and Darya Imad Shah of Berar. The war was a defeat for the Bijapuri–Bidar side, who ceded a northern district of the Bijapur Sultanate to Ahmednagar. Burhan and Ibrahim allowed Ahmednagar freedom to expand in Bidar if Bijapur had the same freedom to annex lands from Vijayanagara; Ibrahim imprisoned Ali Barid Shahi of Bidar despite their former alliance, although he was later freed by Jamsheed (who wanted a buffer state in the Deccan). Burhan Nizam Shah besieged the Bijapuri city of Solapur four times, but did not retain it until a third invasion which occupied territory on the southern border. Burhan advanced in a fourth invasion in 1553 with Vijayanagara almost to the Bijapuri capital, but retreated due to failing health.

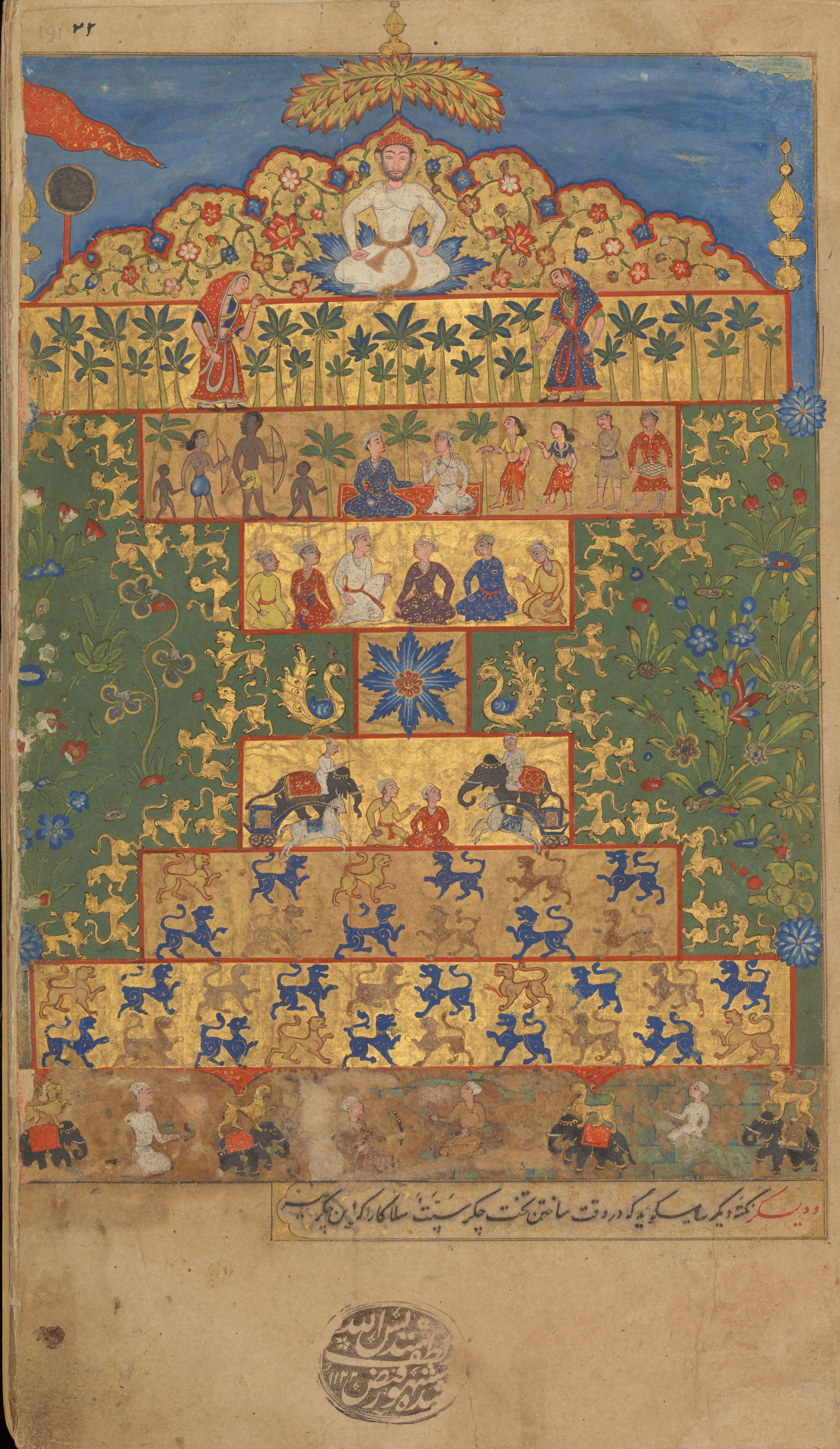
A page from Nujum-ul-Ulum, a manuscript on astrology and metaphysics completed during the reign of Ali Adil Shah I

Ali Adil Shah I, who ascended the throne in 1558, reestablished Shia Islam as the state religion. He unsuccessfully asked Hussain Nizam Shah I for the return of Solapur and Kaliyani (both seized in Ahmednagari invasions) and then invaded the Nizam Shahi kingdom with assistance from Vijayanagara's de facto ruler Rama Raya and Ibrahim Qutb Shah, besieging Ahmednagar and other cities. Hussain sued for peace in 1561, submitting to Rama Raya and returning Kaliyani to Ali Adil Shah. In 1563, Hussain attempted to regain Kaliyani and again besieged it. Ahmednagar was besieged by Ali, and Hussain was forced to abandon his siege of Kaliyani; the only beneficiary of the conflict was Vijayanagara, who gained territory from invading Golconda. Vijayanagara negotiated additional land from Bijapur, including the cities of Yadgir and Bagalkote. Wary of Vijayanagara's growing power, Ali allied his forces with the sultans of Golconda, Ahmednagar and Bidar (despite past conflicts) and defeated the Vijayanagara Empire in the 1565 Battle of Talikota. Rama Raya was beheaded after his capture by Deccani forces. Vijayanagara and nearby cities were sacked and looted (Vijayanagara for five to six months), and historian Hermann Goetz said that this prompted the emigration of much of Vijayanagara's population to Bijapur. The Raichur Doab and its surrounding area were returned to Bijapur. The Vijayanagara military was demolished, and the kingdom was a shell of its former self. Ali I then fortified Bijapur with a wall, which facilitated the further centralization of authority. Subsequent architectural projects encouraged the growth of the city and its skilled class. Another conflict between Ahmednagar and Bijapur arose in 1567; although Ali invaded Ahmednagar and his forces occupied a number of forts, the war ended in a stalemate. A 1570 conflict with the Portuguese began with the hope of expelling them from India, but Ali was defeated after a number of encounters the following year. He then annexed more land from Vijayanagara in a campaign which lasted until 1575, conquering Adoni and much of the Carnatic. Ali also began a campaign to capture the Karnatak; according to Richard M. Eaton, his "armies destroyed two to three hundred Hindu temples" which were replaced with Shia buildings. By 1576, land gained under Ali I had doubled the sultanate's holdings. He forged diplomatic relations with the Mughals, Ottomans, and Safavids during his reign, which Eaton says brought the sultanate into the dar al-islam.

=== Peak and decline (1580–1686) ===
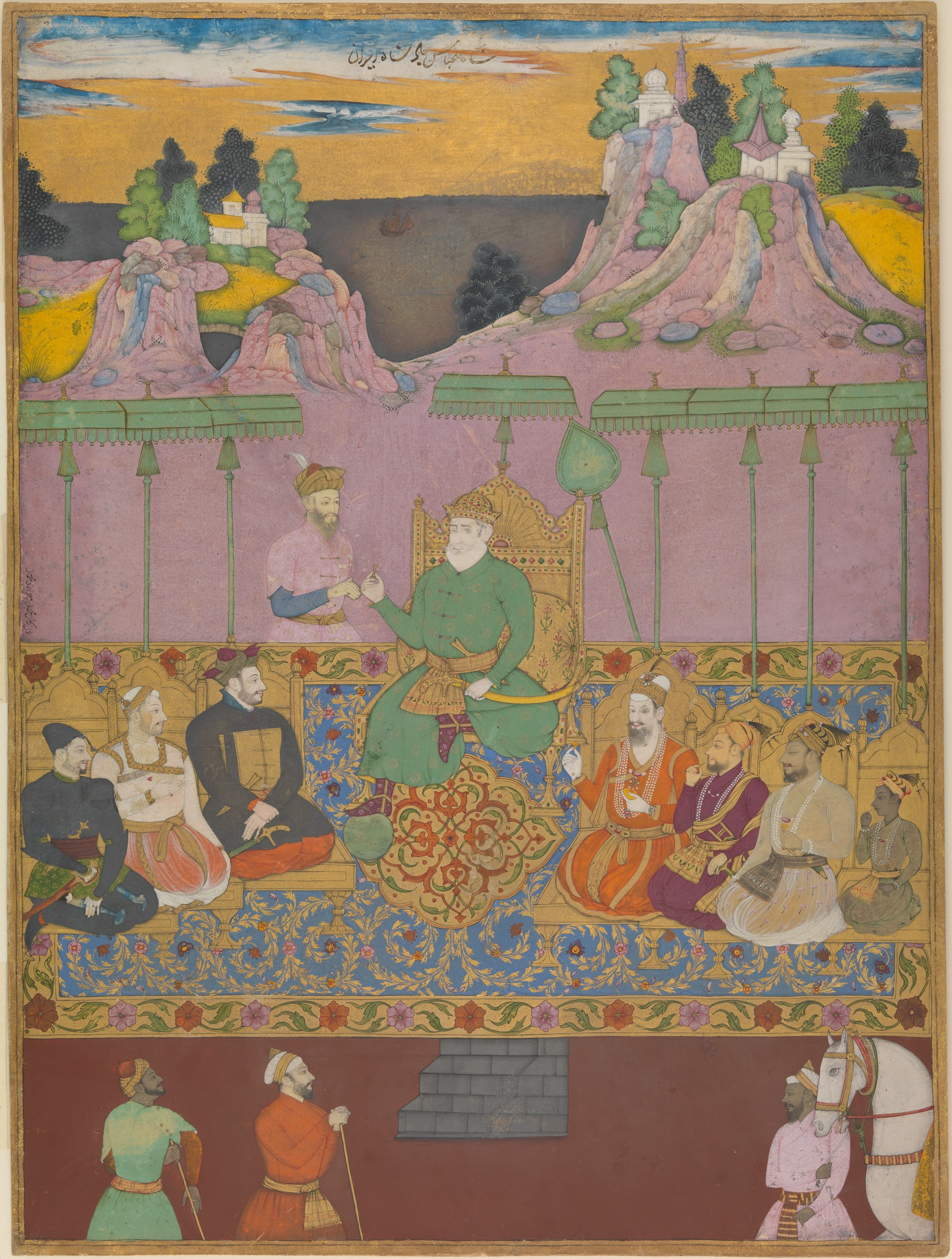
The House of Bijapur, a 1680 painting of the nine Bijapur sultans and Shah Ismail of the Safavid dynasty

Ali I had no son, and his nine-year-old nephew Ibrahim II was set on the throne in 1580. Control of the regency was contested by Kamal Khan and, later, by the Habshi Dilawar Khan (who reverted the state religion to Sunni Islam). Dilawar was deposed by Ibrahim II in 1590. Ibrahim's rule was characterised by prosperity and patronage; Sufism thrived, with its adherents and others flocking to Bijapur because of his talent as a musician and poet. Religious and cultural syncretism reached a zenith, and the capital was one of India's most prosperous; population estimates in the latter half of Ibrahim's rule are as high as one million, and accounts from a Jesuit in Ali I's rule and a Mughal diplomat in the same period of Ibrahim's rule indicate the increase of wealth of the commoners and city. Ibrahim suppressed a 1594 rebellion by his brother, Ismail, who was aided by Burhan II of Ahmednagar. Despite their past quarrels, the Adil Shahis formed an alliance in 1597 with Ahmednagar and Golconda to deter further Mughal advances in the Deccan. The alliance, led by a Bijapuri general, was defeated despite a three-to-one numerical advantage. Ahmednagar fell to the Mughals in 1600, but Ibrahim continued to support the eventually-successful resistance of Malik Ambar. Ibrahim II founded the city of Nauraspur in 1599, three kilometers west of Bijapur, as a planned center of learning and art; never completed, it was destroyed in 1624 by Malik Ambar's forces. In 1618, the sultan lost the fortress of Janjira to the independent Habshi state of western India. The following year, Bijapur conquered the neighbouring Bidar Sultanate (although control of the state was achieved as early as 1580). This was preceded by an agreement between the rulers of Bijapur and the Ahmednagar Sultanate, who divided their spheres of influence; the Ahmednagar Sultanate could conquer the Berar Sultanate if the Adil Shahis could expand south into the decaying Vijayanagara Empire without hindrance from the Nizam Shahis. Bidar was in neither sphere of influence and Malik Ambar, de facto ruler of Ahmednagar, invaded Bijapur; after reaching the capital relatively unopposed, he withdrew. In addition to his work on Nauraspur, the sultan built the Ibrahim Rauza.

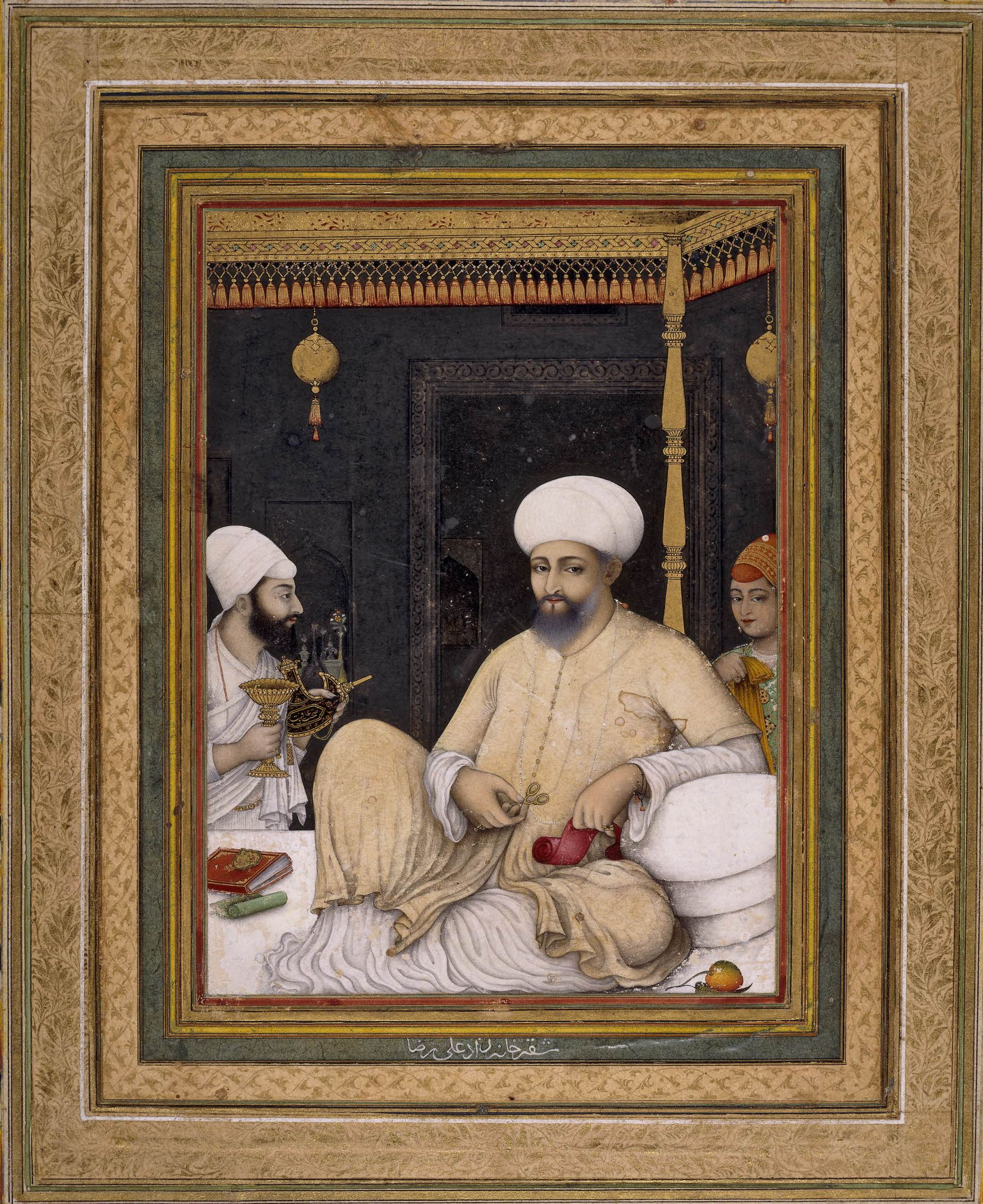
Painting by the Bijapuri Ali Riza of Ibrahim Adil Shah II venerating a Sufi saint

Muhammad Adil Shah succeeded his father, Ibrahim II, in 1627. Under Muhammad, the Sultanate of Bijapur reached its zenith. The first Mughal invasion of the sultanate was in 1631 by Shah Jahan, who reached (and besieged) Bijapur but was ultimately unsuccessful. In 1636, Bijapur signed a treaty agreeing to pay tribute to the Mughal emperor and acknowledge Mughal authority. As a reward for this gesture, the recent Mughal conquest of Ahmednagar was partitioned between the two states. The treaty began a period of relative peace with the Mughals, allowing for more southern conquests; Bijapur reached its territorial peak, with its borders stretching from the Arabian Sea to the Bay of Bengal. The sultanate began a rapid decline halfway through Muhammad's reign, primarily due to strained relations with nobles and landholders (many of whom later worked for the Mughals) and the revolt of Pune governor Shivaji, whose father was a Maratha commander for Muhammad Adil Shah (part of the Karnatak campaigns). Muhammad Adil Shah died in 1656 after a decade-long, paralyzing illness.

Ali Adil Shah II inherited a troubled kingdom which was invaded by Mughal forces in 1657 under viceroy Aurangzeb, who captured Bidar and other forts and reached Bijapur before retreating; Aurangzeb annexed much of the occupied territory, including Bidar. The stability of the Bijapur Sultanate was again affected by trouble with the Marathas, who persisted with raids and rebellions. Bijapuri general Afzal Khan was sent to subdue Shivaji in 1659, but he was murdered and his home fort of Pratapgarh was captured in a confrontation with Shivaji. Despite further Maratha advances in the north, Ali continued his southern campaigns in the Karnatak and Carnatic and captured Thanjavur and other cities from the Nayakas from 1659 to 1663.

Sikandar Adil Shah, the last Adil Shahi sultan, ruled for fourteen troubled years. His reign saw a number of civil wars, internal strife and unrest, particularly over his regency; he was four years old at his accession. Khawas Khan, Sikandar's first regent and leader of the Deccani faction, took control of the state before his removal from power. Shivaji founded an independent Maratha kingdom which became the Maratha Confederacy in 1674, with de facto control of much of the Adil Shahis' original territory in the Deccan. He undid almost all the southern Bijapuri conquests over the following years, annexing the territory and renewing efforts to conquer the remaining Muslim Deccan states after Shivaji's death in 1680. In April 1685, Mughal forces led by Aurangzeb began a siege of Bijapur; at its conclusion, on 12 September 1686, the Sultanate of Bijapur came to an end. The capital and its surrounding territory were annexed into an eponymous subah, and Sikandar was sent into Mughal captivity.

== Culture ==
=== Architecture ===
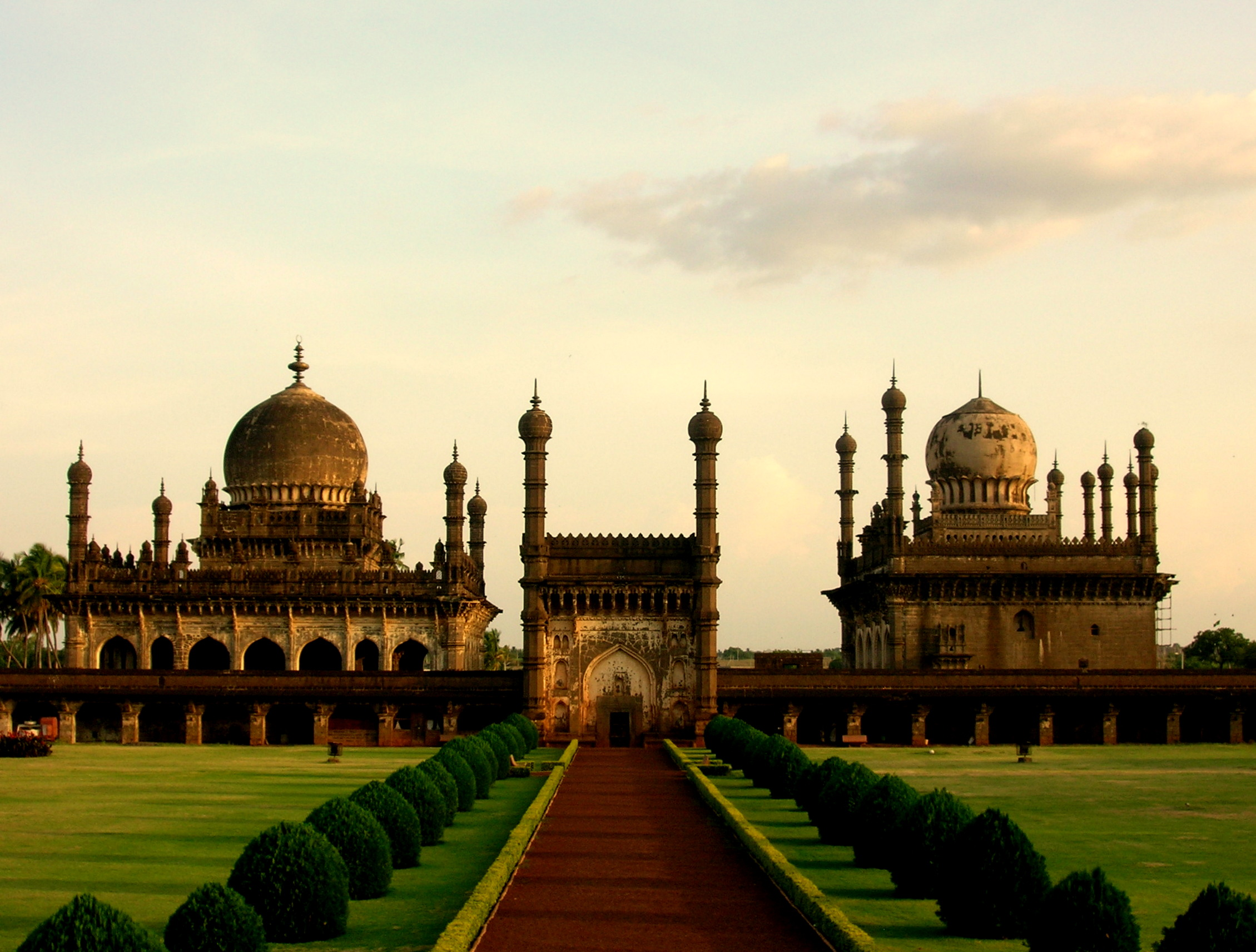
The Ibrahim Rauza in Bijapur, commissioned by Ibrahim Adil Shah II

The sultanate's architecture, a subset of Deccani architecture, was a variant of Indo-Islamic architecture influenced by that of the Middle East. Adil Shahi architecture was of good quality with a localized, unique nature. It was characterised by large domes and dargahs (Sufi shrines), complex turrets, geometric and Arabic (or Persian) calligraphic designs, and decorated friezes of tholobates.

Yusuf Adil Shah, the first sultan, began by expanding two dargahs at Gulbarga with minarets. The first building characteristic of Adil Shahi architecture was a congregational mosque (jama masjid) built during the reign of Ibrahim Adil Shah I. The primary Jami Masjid of Bijapur, built under Ali I, was commissioned in 1576. The largest of any structure of its type in the Deccan when it was built, Eaton calls it "one of the most imposing and magnificent" in the region. Under Ibrahim II, the sultanate's most prolific patron, Adil Shahi architecture focused on intricate carvings and detail and adopted Hindu–Muslim syncretism; this change is seen in the Malika Jahan Begum mosque built by the sultan in 1586. His most notable commissioned work was the eponymous Ibrahim Rauza, completed in 1626, with a mosque built in honour of his wife and a mausoleum for his family. Mohammed Adil Shah facilitated the creation of the Gol Gumbaz, his mausoleum and one of Bijapur's greatest monuments. It is supported by large, arched recesses and a massive dome, the largest in the Islamic world when it was nearly completed at Muhammad's death in 1656. The last major Adil Shahi architectural project was the Bara Kaman, Ali Adil Shah II's unfinished mausoleum, which halted construction with his death in 1672.

=== Painting and literature ===
The Adil Shahis used miniature painting from the Bijapur school of Deccan painting. Miniature painting was virtually nonexistent in the sultanate before the reign of Ali I, but became widespread under his rule and flourished under Ibrahim II and his successors. The Bijapur school of painting was rooted in Persian miniature painting and culture, and was usually baroque in style. In contrast to North Indian contemporary painting, it seldom depicted events and scenes of war but focused on atmospheric, picturesque fantasies and dreams, avoiding logic in general.

The Adil Shahi sultans promoted the development of writing in the Deccani language, and Bijapur was a center of its early literary evolution. Ibrahim II, a skilled writer of Deccani Urdu literature, was one of its earliest proponents. He wrote the Kitab-i Nauras, a Deccani musical poetry work, and patronized a number of poets and their work. His poet laureate, the Persian Muhammad Zuhuri, wrote the Saqinama, a collection of lyric poetry. After entering Ibrahim's service in 1604 and gaining his trust, Firishta followed the sultan's suggestion and wrote the Tarikh-i Firishta, his history of the medieval Deccan which is the basis for much modern historiography on the region and period. Nusrati, a noted Deccani poet, wrote the later romantic poem Gulshan-i 'Ishq and a narrative of the sultan's conquests under the patronage of Ali Adil Shah II.

== Rulers ==
Nine sultans ruled the Sultanate of Bijapur from 1490 to 1686, with the title of Sultan of Bijapur.

House of Adil-Shahi

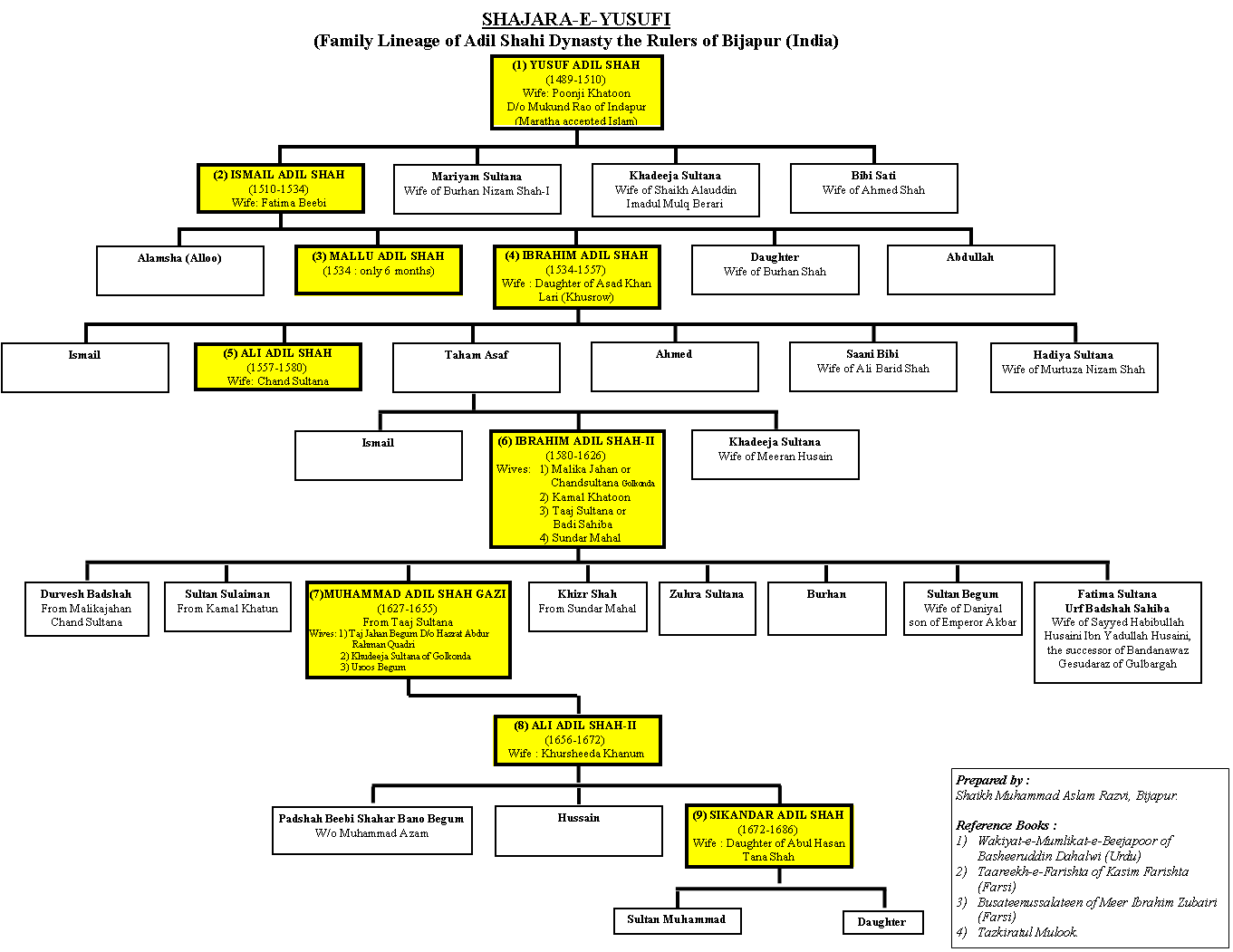
Genealogy of Yusuf Adil Shah

Bijapur Sultanate

Yusuf; Adil-Shah r. 1490–1510
Isma'il; Adil-Shah r. 1510–1534
Mallu; Adil-Shah r. 1534–1535 | Ibrahim I Adil-Shah r. 1535–1558
Ali I Adil-Shah r. 1558–1580 | Tahmasp
Ibrahim II; Adil-Shah r. 1580–1627
Muhammad; Adil-Shah r. 1627–1656
Ali II; Adil-Shah r. 1656–1672
Sikandar; Adil-Shah r. 1672–1686

| Titular Name | Personal Name | Reign |
|---|---|---|
Independence from the Bahmani Sultanate (1490)
| Amir أمیر | Yusuf Adil Shah یوسف عادل شاہ | 1490–1510 |
| Adil Khani عادل خانی | Ismail Adil Shah اسماعیل عادل شاہ | 1510–1534 |
| Adil Khani عادل خانی | Mallu Adil Shah ملو عادل شاہ | 1534–1535 |
| Adil Khani عادل خانی | Ibrahim Adil Shah I ابراہیم عادل شاہ اول | 1535–1558 |
| Adil Khani عادل خانی | Ali Adil Shah I علی عادل شاہ اول | 1558–1580 |
| Adil Khani عادل خانی | Ibrahim Adil Shah II ابراہیم عادل شاہ دوئم | 1580–1627 |
| Adil Khani عادل خانی | Mohammed Adil Shah محمد عادل شاہ | 1627–1656 |
| Adil Khani عادل خانی | Ali Adil Shah II علی عادل شاہ دوئم | 1656–1672 |
| Adil Khani عادل خانی | Sikandar Adil Shah سکندر عادل شاہ | 1672–1686 |
Conquered by Aurangzeb of the Mughal Empire in 1686.

== See also ==
- Islam in South Asia
- Adil Shahi–Portuguese conflicts
- Bijapur–Mysore Conflict
- Sath Kabar
