= Yogini with a Mynah Bird =

17th-century Indian painting

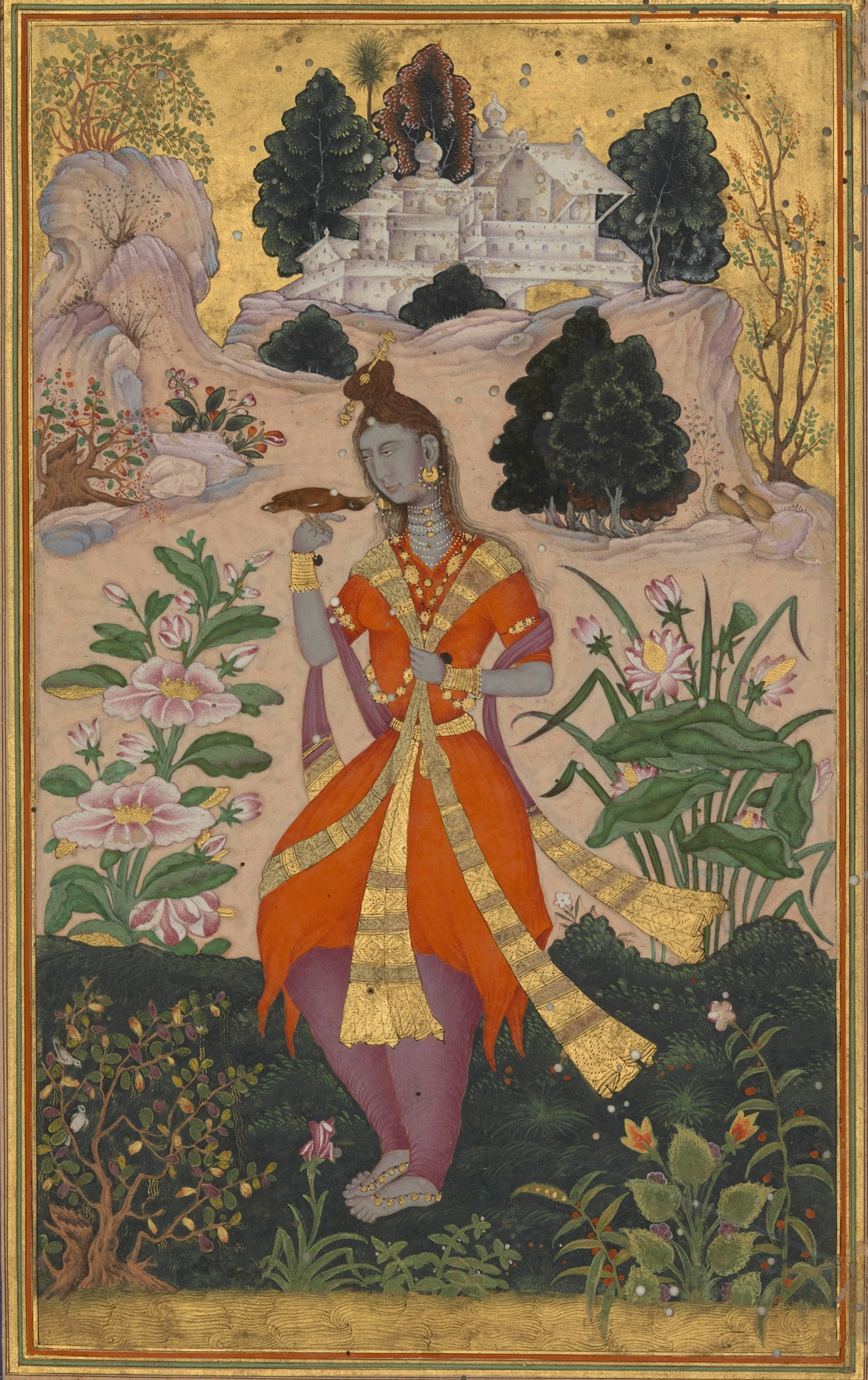
- Dimensions: 44 cm × 32 cm (17 in × 13 in)
- Location: Chester Beatty Library, Dublin

Yogini with a Mynah Bird is a Deccan-styled painting located in the Chester Beatty Library.

== Background ==
It is dated to the early 17th century, and presumably commissioned for the court of Ibrahim Adil Shah II.

== Description ==
The principal subject is a woman, who has the characteristic features of a yogini, with ash-coloured skin and top-knotted hair. She is wearing a red peshwaj, with a golden dupatta and gold jewellery. A myna bird is perched upon her right hand.

On either side of the woman are lotus and peony plants, the design of which was likely copied from Chinese porcelain or textiles. In the background is a golden sky, beneath which are rocks characteristic of the Deccan, and a hill, atop which is a palace. The painting is surrounded by poetic texts in Persian, on all four sides.

== Analysis ==
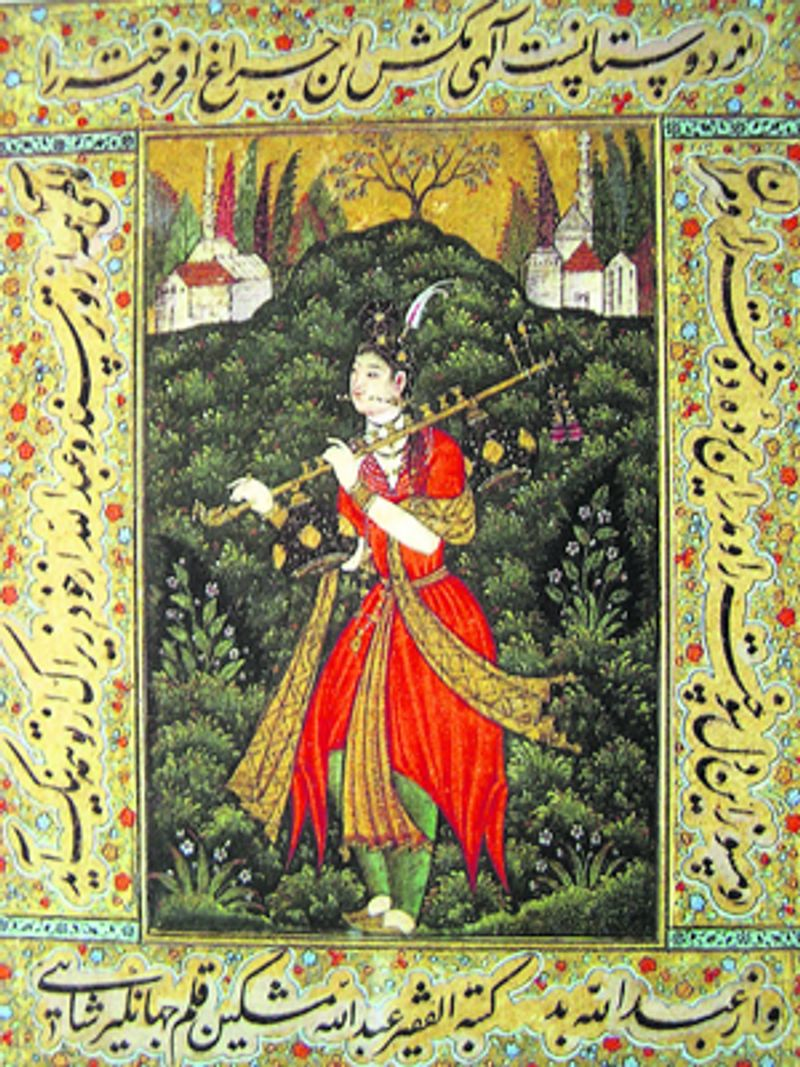
Another depiction of a princess-like yogini in a Deccan painting, dated to about 1600, located in the Jagdish and Kamla Mittal Museum.

The woman's appearance gives rise to conflicting interpretations. Her top-knotted hair and ash-besmeared skin identify her as a yogini. The elongated shape of her body also points toward her status as an ascetic, as her leanness may be due to fasting.

However, her attire consisting of the peshwaj, golden dupatta, and lavish gold jewellery suggest that she belongs to the aristocracy. In South Asian literature, myna birds are associated with noble ladies, who keep them as pets. The palace in the background gives rise to the interpretation that she has left behind her past life.

This depiction of princess-like yoginis is common in Deccan art. Examples of this include a painting in the Jagdish and Kamla Mittal Museum.

Mark Zebrowski interprets her to be a sorceress. He describes her face as "Medusa-like" and points out that the bird could represent an ill omen. He says that the dark theme of the painting may represent the "seductive heresies" that enticed Ibrahim II away from orthodox Islam. (Note: Ibrahim Adil Shah II was fascinated by Hinduism as well as mysticism, and described himself as a Hindu god in one of the poems he composed in the Kitab-i Nauras.Zebrowski 1983, pp. 67, 70)

== Bibliography ==
- Zebrowski, Mark (1983). Deccani Painting. Roli Books International, New Delhi.
