= Nujum-ul-Ulum =

Illustrated encyclopedia about ancient Indian astrology

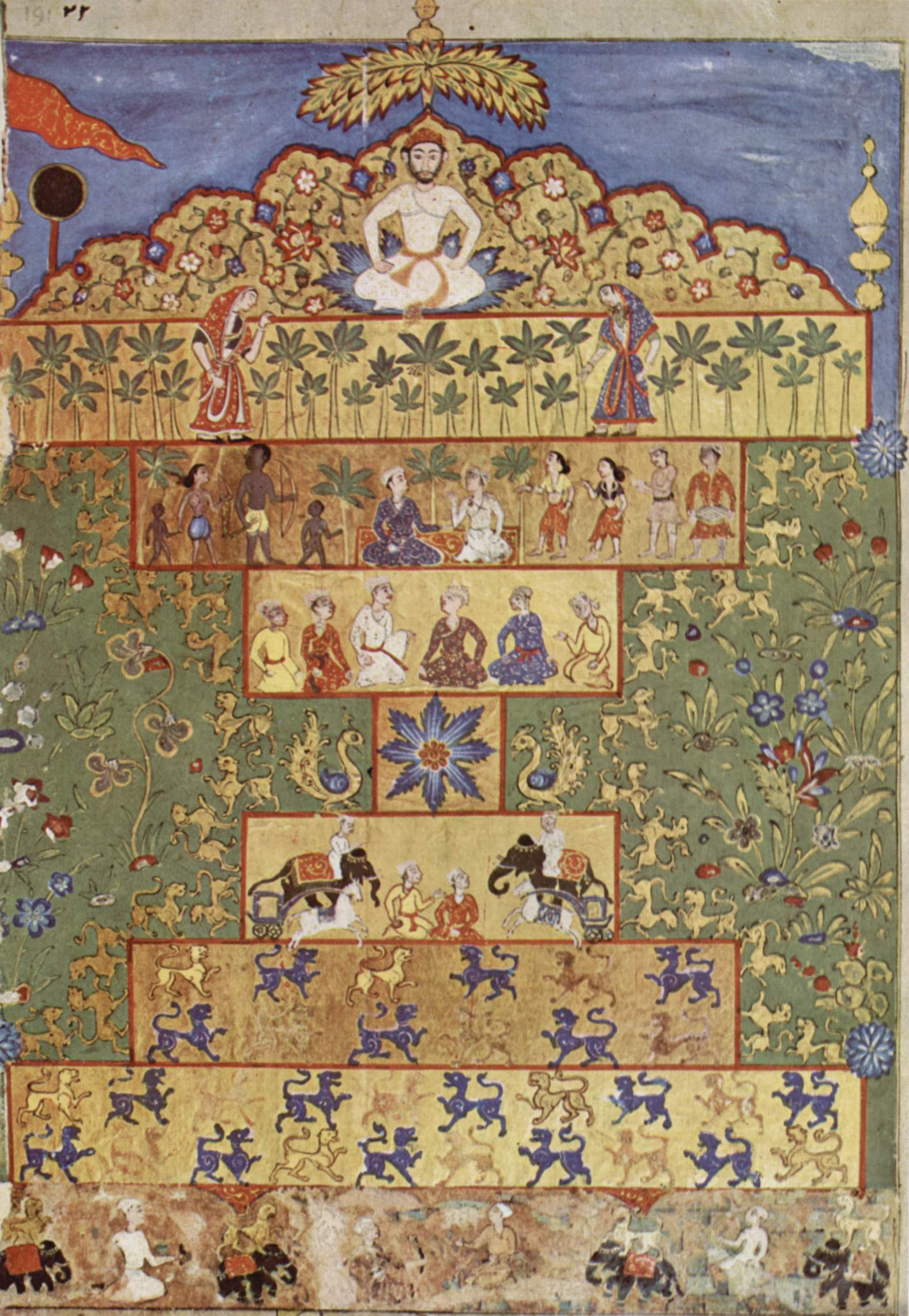
An untypically large miniature from the Dublin MS

Nujum-ul-Ulum ('Stars of the Sciences', c. 1570 CE), is a manuscript commissioned during the Adil Shahi rulers of Bijapur, India. The manuscript is described as an illustrated encyclopedia about ancient Indian astrology and astral magic. The book consists of 876 miniature paintings and about 400 paintings of various angels, planets, signs, degrees, Sufic talismans, magical spells, Hindu goddesses, astrological tables and horoscopes, animals and weapons. These are among the earliest examples of the Deccan painting style.

== History ==
The manuscript was completed on August 17, 1570, in Bijapur, during the regime of Ali Adil Shah I. It is considered to be an illustrated manual or encyclopedia of astrology and astral magic. The imprinted date and painting style indicates that either the work was commissioned by the Bijapur sultan Ali Adil Shah (1557-1579) or by one of the members of his court. This hypothesis is strengthened by the length of the volume, the quality and quantity of its miniatures, the extensive use of gold in the manuscript, and the number of painters employed - all factors that seem to suggest a royal patron.

In fact, Emma Flatt in her recent article on the Nujum al-‘ulum goes further to attribute, from internal evidence, the authorship to Ali Adil Shah himself "or at least the sixteenth-century equivalent of a celebrity ghostwriter".

The author and professor O. P. Parameswaran writes that this school of Bijapur was patronized by Adil Shah I (1558-1580) and his successor Ibrahim II (1580-1627), both of whom were patrons of art and letters, while the latter was an expert in Indian music and author of a book on this subject, the Nauras Nama. The rulers of Bijapur had cordial relations with Turkey and Persia, and the astronomical illustrations in the Nujum al-‘ulum might well derive from an Ottoman Turkish manuscript, such as the works of Fuzuli.

== Description ==
The manuscript's description in the Chester Beatty Library says that the Nujum al-‘ulum (‘Stars of the Sciences’) is a compendium of Muslim and Hindu beliefs mainly dealing with astrology and magic. Depending on how they are counted, the manuscript contains between four and almost eight hundred illustrations. The folios included here illustrate the northern constellations Andromeda (portrayed as a woman) and the Horse, the Sun in a chariot, the zodiac sign Leo (a lion) with accompanying nakshatras (mansions of the moon) and degrees, Jupiter depicted as an elderly king in procession, and the Universal Ruler (cakravatin) upon his seven-storied throne. The only other copy of this text known was also produced in Bijapur, about a hundred years later, and is also in the Chester Beatty Library.
