= Jagdish Mittal =

Indian artist (1925–2025)

- Born: 16 September 1925
- Died: 7 January 2025 (aged 99); Hyderabad, Telangana, India
- Awards: Padma Shri

Jagdish Chandra Mittal (16 September 1925 – 7 January 2025) was an Indian artist and art collector. His collection is housed in the Jagdish and Kamla Mittal Museum. In 1990, he was awarded the Padma Shri.

== Life and career ==
Mittal was born on 16 September 1925 in Mussoorie. His father was an engineer. In 1945, he graduated from the Kala Bhavan in Santiniketan.

In the 1950s, Jagdish and his wife settled in Hyderabad. In 1976, they established the Jagdish and Kamla Mittal Museum of Indian art at their residence.

Mittal died on 7 January 2025, at the age of 99.
