= Ibrahim Adil Shah II Hawking =

1590s painting by Farrukh Beg

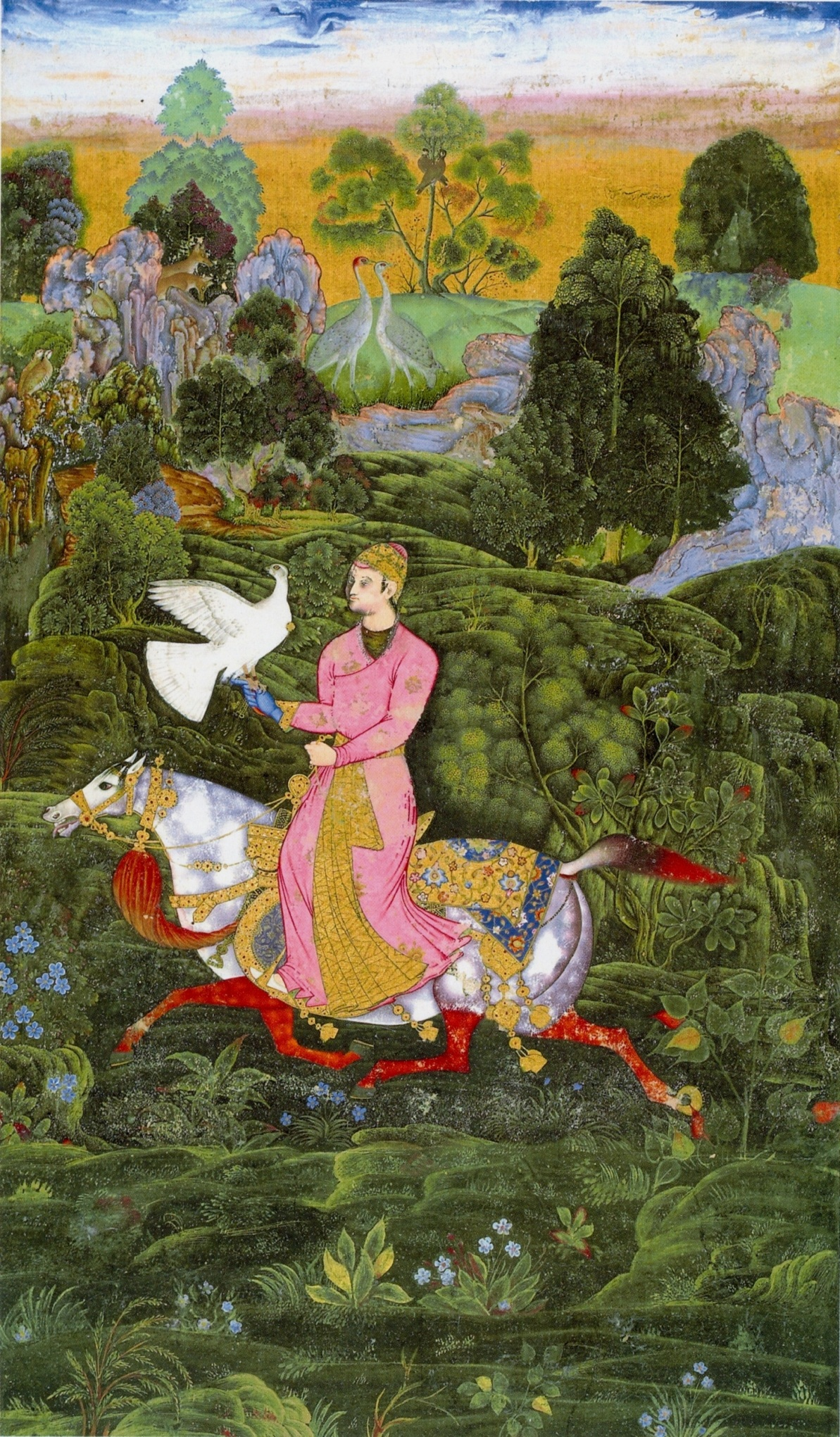
- Artist: Farrukh Beg
- Year: c. 1590–95
- Medium: Opaque watercolor and gold on paper
- Dimensions: 11.3 x 6.1 in. (28.7 x 15.6 cm)
- Location: Institute of Oriental Studies of the Russian Academy of Sciences, St. Petersburg

Ibrahim Adil Shah II Hawking is a Deccan painting created in India by the Persian painter Farrukh Beg in the early 1590s. It depicts Ibrahim Adil Shah II, the ruler of the Bijapur Sultanate, as a young man riding a horse through a meadow. The work is now in the Institute of Oriental Studies of the Russian Academy of Sciences in St. Petersburg, as part of the "St Petersburg Album" of Indian miniatures.

== Background ==
The painting depicts Ibrahim Adil Shah II, the sultan (ruler) of the Bijapur Sultanate. A Persian inscription on the painting reads, "Amal-i Farrukh Beg ast" (transl. "This is the work of Farrukh Beg"). Beg was a Persian painter known for his work in the Mughal court. He had spent several years in Bijapur, under the patronage of the sultan. This work was painted during Beg's tenure in Bijapur. This is apparent from the fact that an inscription on the top-right identifies the subject as a khaqan (emperor), rather than by the lower title of Khan, by which he would have been known in the Mughal court.

It is dated to c. 1590–1595. This date is also supported by the fact that the sultan had not yet grown a beard. This was about the time Beg moved to Bijapur, and thus it is identified as one of his first works in the kingdom.

== Description ==
The principal subject is Ibrahim Adil Shah II, riding a horse through a meadow, with a hawk on his wrist. He is dressed in a pink jama with a Deccan-styled golden katzeb. The white horse has its legs dyed red. Precious stones adorn its harness, and the saddle is also decorated with an ornate pattern. The hawk, the sultan, and the horse are all looking toward the left, as if they had seen something in that direction.

Bluish rocks are seen in the background, with various creatures, including jackals, pheasants, and cranes, emerging from them. Beyond these is a golden horizon.

An inscription on the top-right reads, "Tasveer-i khaqan-i ’azam Ibrahim Adil Shah" (transl. "Portrait of the great emperor, Ibrahim Adil Shah"). B. N. Goswamy notes that the rulers of Bijapur could not claim to be emperors, due to the presence of the Mughal empire in northern India. Therefore, he posits that the title, in the exaggerated style of poets, was meant to reflect a dream rather than reality. This aligns with the dreamy landscape of the painting.
