= Golconda painting =

School of Indian miniature painting

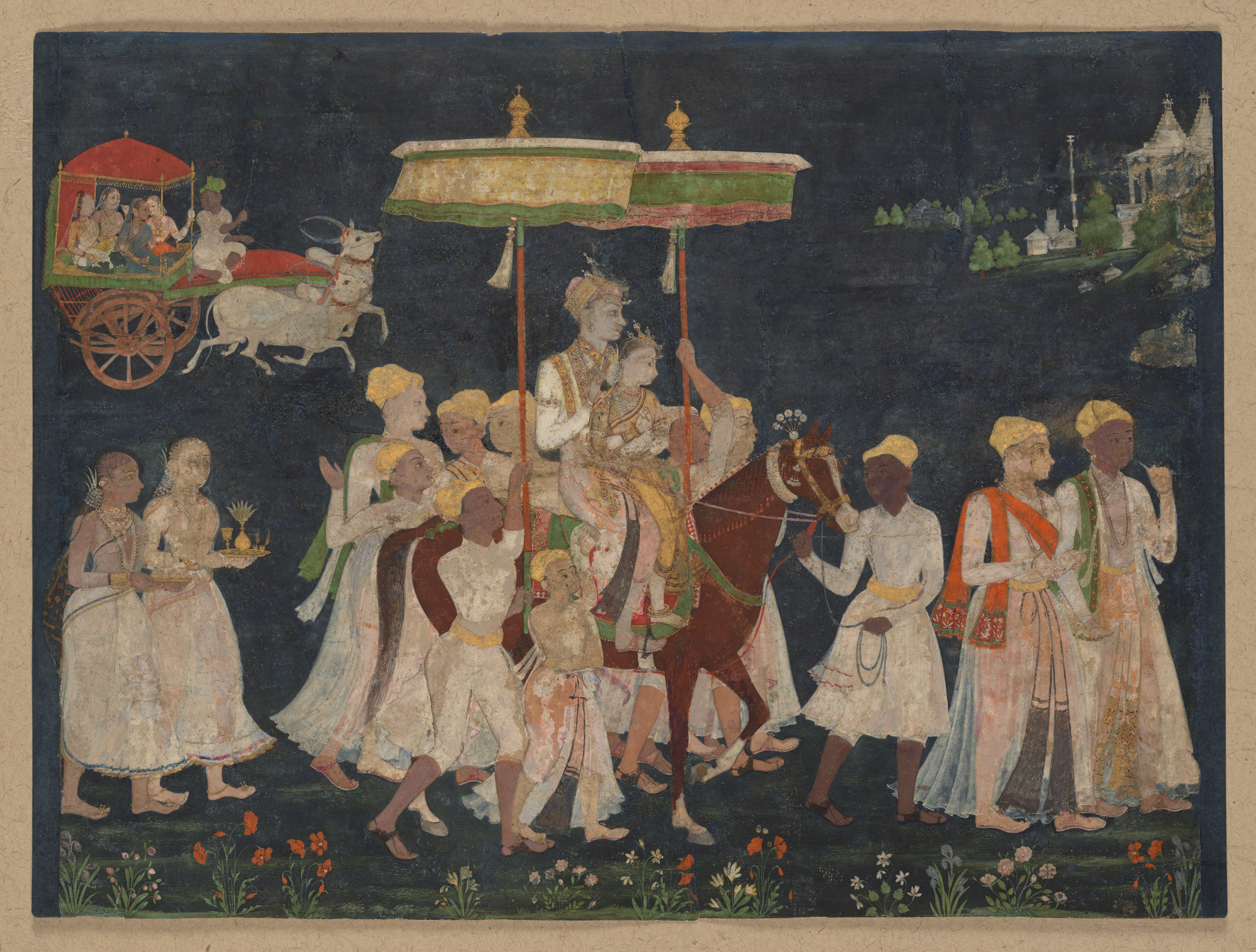
Wedding Procession of Sultan Muhammad Quli Qutb Shah ca. 1650

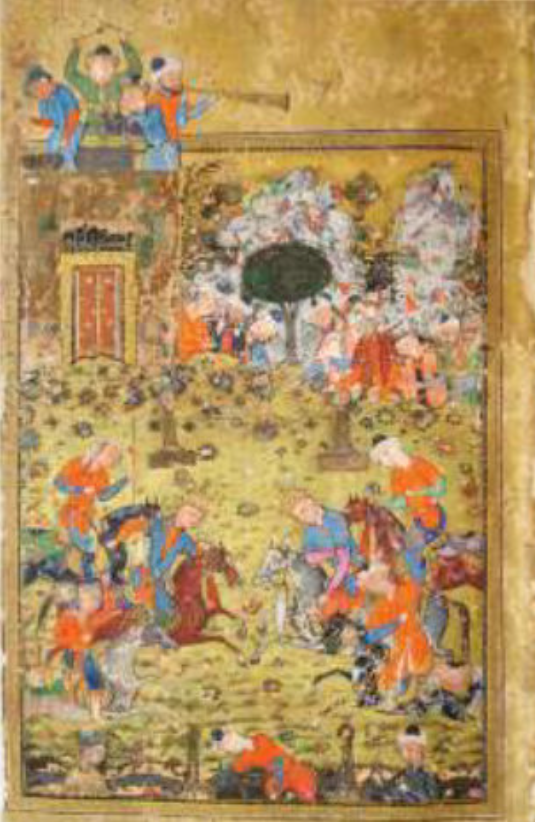
Polo match, folio 5a of the Kulliyat of Sultan Muhammad Quli Qutb Shah, Golconda, c. 1590-1600 27.7 X 14.5 cm, Salar Jung Museum

Golconda painting refers to the school of miniature painting developed during the reign of the Golconda Sultanate. It is itself a type of Deccan painting, and closely related to other Deccan schools, such as Bijapur and Ahmednagar.

== Characteristics ==
Artists from all over India and the Islamic world emigrated to Golconda, up until the Mughal conquest in 1687. Consequently, Golconda paintings are the most heterogenous among the styles of the Deccan sultanates.

A local character did develop inevitably—especially in the use of local pigments. Zebrowski characterizes Golconda paintings as having a "tense opulence that is quite different from the poignant romanticism of Bijapur or the refined dignity of Ahmadnagar portraiture."

== History ==
=== Ibrahim Qutb Shah ===
Sultan Ibrahim is regarded as the first patron of miniature paintings among the Golconda sultans.

=== Muhammad Quli Qutb Shah ===
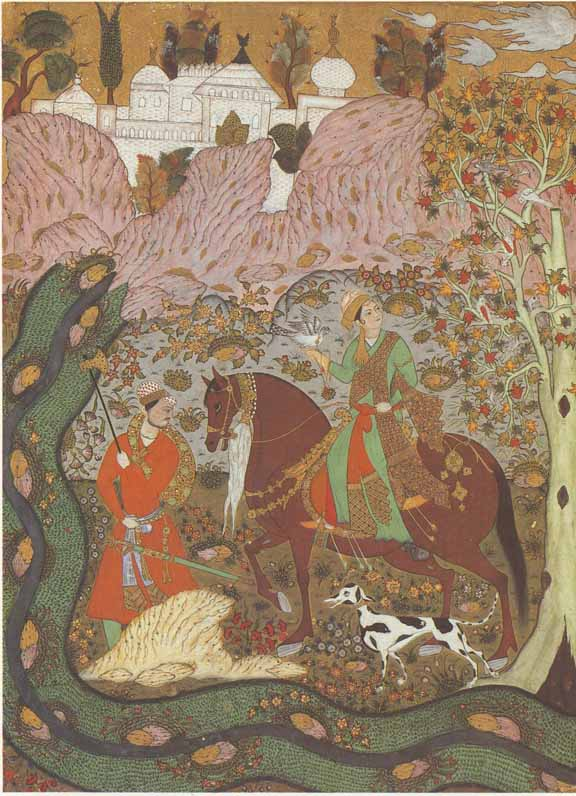
A prince hawking

The fifth sultan of the dynasty, Muhammad Quli Qutb Shah, is regarded as an important patron of the arts. Most of the surviving paintings from this period are contained within a manuscript of the Kulliyat (collection) of the sultan's poetry, located in the Salar Jung Museum. This work is considered to be the sultan's own copy, owing to its rich illustration and illumination.

The paintings make heavy use of Persian imagery, incorporating very few new elements, only in terms of the color palette used and the technique of the application of marbled paper to represent objects, such as the body of a peacock.

Four paintings of note are attributed to a Golconda artist, active in the early seventeenth century. A Prince Hawking is the most famous of these, deriving from Bijapur paintings such as Yogini.

=== Abdullah Qutb Shah ===
As Golconda turned into a Mughal protectorate, the paintings from the 1630s and onwards show a distinctive Mughal influence. Golconda portraitists started placing their subjects against an empty background, as was done in Mughal portraits.

=== Abul Hasan Qutb Shah ===
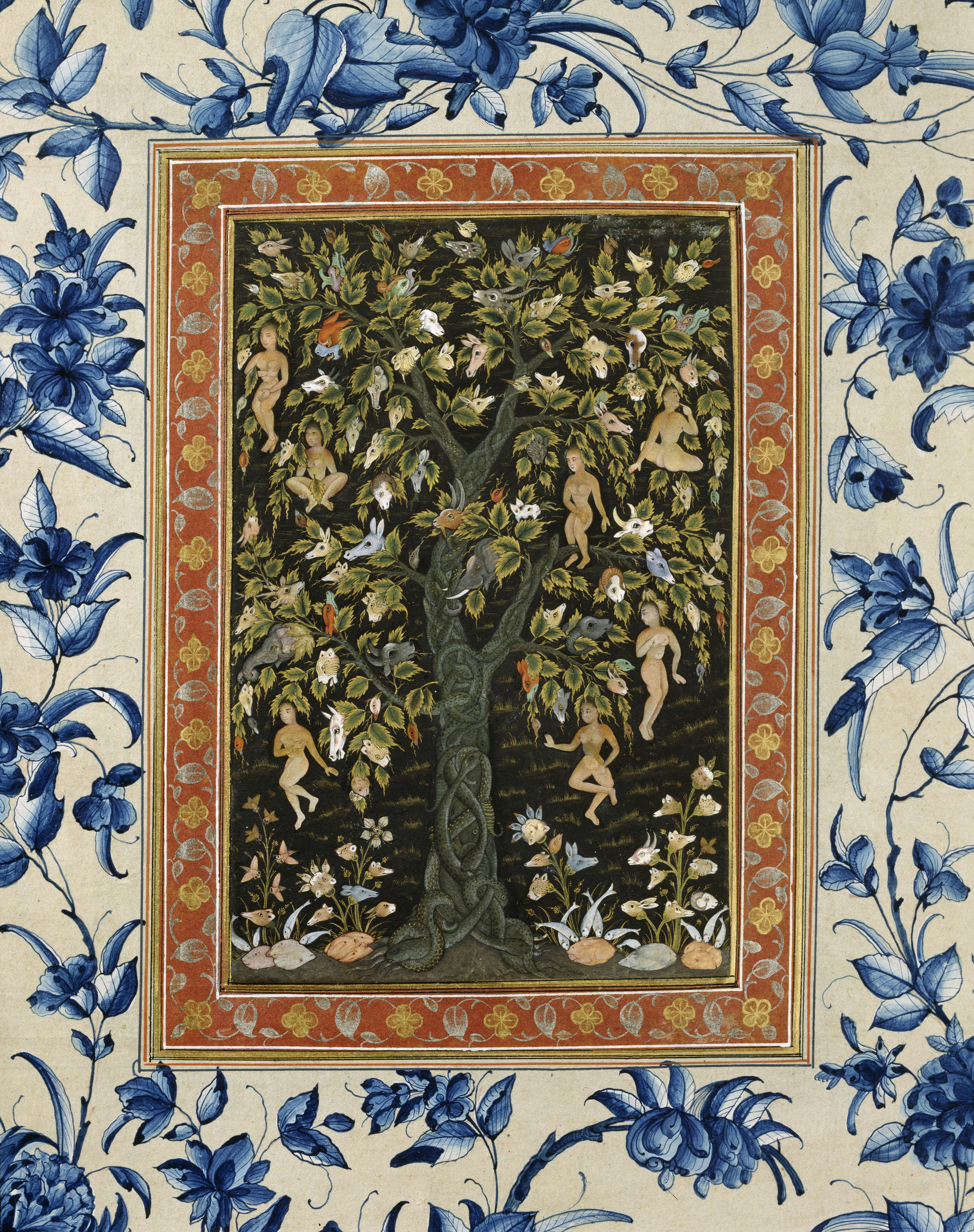
Tree on the Island of Waqwaq. Golconda, early 17th century Ink, opaque watercolor, and gold on paper Museum für Islamische Kunst, Staatliche Museen zu Berlin

Hermann Goetz states, "All the datable products of this school belong to the times of Sultan Abul- Hasan. There is, however, every reason to believe that this school originated under his predecessor ‘Abdullah, during whose reign Golconda art was strongly influenced by that of the Emperor Jahangir's and, to a less extent, that of Shah Jahan’s court."

Mark Zebrowski posits that painters from Bijapur emigrated to Golconda in the middle of the seventeenth century, as can be seen from the influence of the Bijapur school in paintings of this period.
