= History of Aurangabad =

History of a medieval Indian town

Aurangabad is a medieval Indian town named after Mughal Emperor Aurangzeb, who established this town during his tenure as the Viceroy of the Deccan (Dakhin), a geographical region comprising parts of modern-day Maharashtra, Telangana and Karnataka.

== History ==
Malik Ambar made it his capital and the men of his army raised their dwellings around it. Within a decade, Kharki became a populous and imposing city. Malik Ambar cherished strong love and ability for architecture. Aurangabad was Ambar's architectural achievement and creation. However, 1621, it was ravaged and burnt down by the imperial troops under Jahangir. Ambar the founder of the city was always referred to by harsh names by Emperor Jahangir. In his memoirs, he never mentions his name without prefixing epithets like wretch, cursed fellow, Habshi, Ambar Siyari, black Ambar, and Ambar Badakhtur. Malik Ambar died in 1626. He was succeeded by his son Fateh Khan, who changed the name of Kharki to Fatehnagar. In the same year, the Moghal viceroy Khan Jahan Lodi, advanced on the city, but retired to Burhanpur on being bribed by the Nizam Shahi Commander, Hamid Khan. With the capture of Daulatabad Fort by the imperial troops in 1633, the Nizam Shahi dominions, including Fatehnagar, came under the possession of the Moghals. In 1653 when Prince Aurangzeb was appointed the viceroy of the Deccan for the second time, he made Fatehnagar his capital and called it Aurangabad. Aurangabad is sometimes referred to as Khujista Bunyad by the Chroniclers of Aurangzeb's reign.

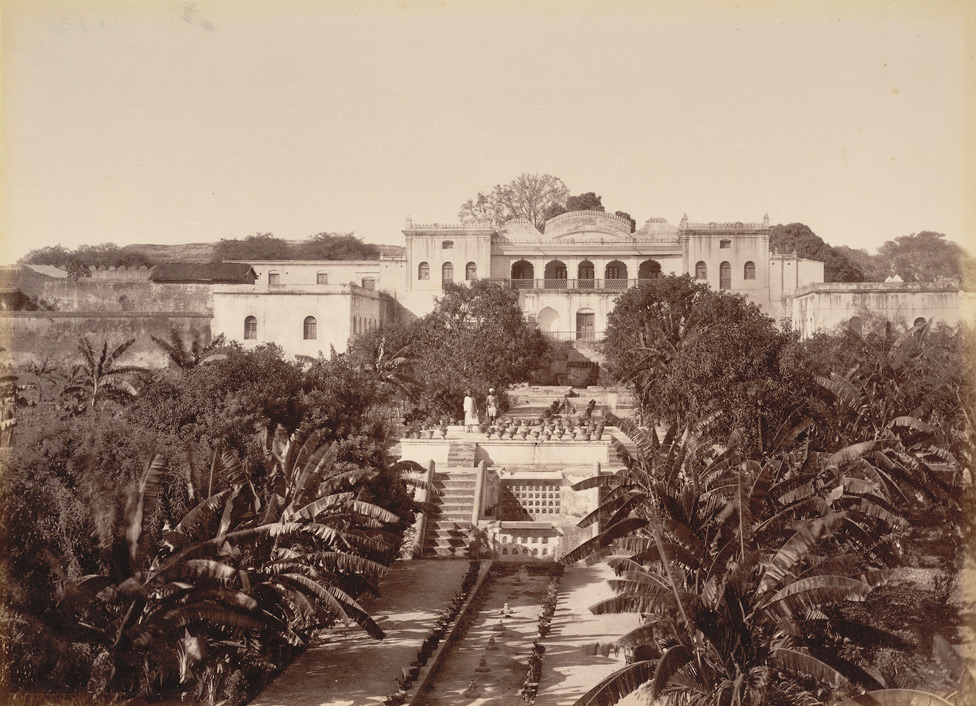
Zeb-un-Nisa's palace, Aurangabad 1880s

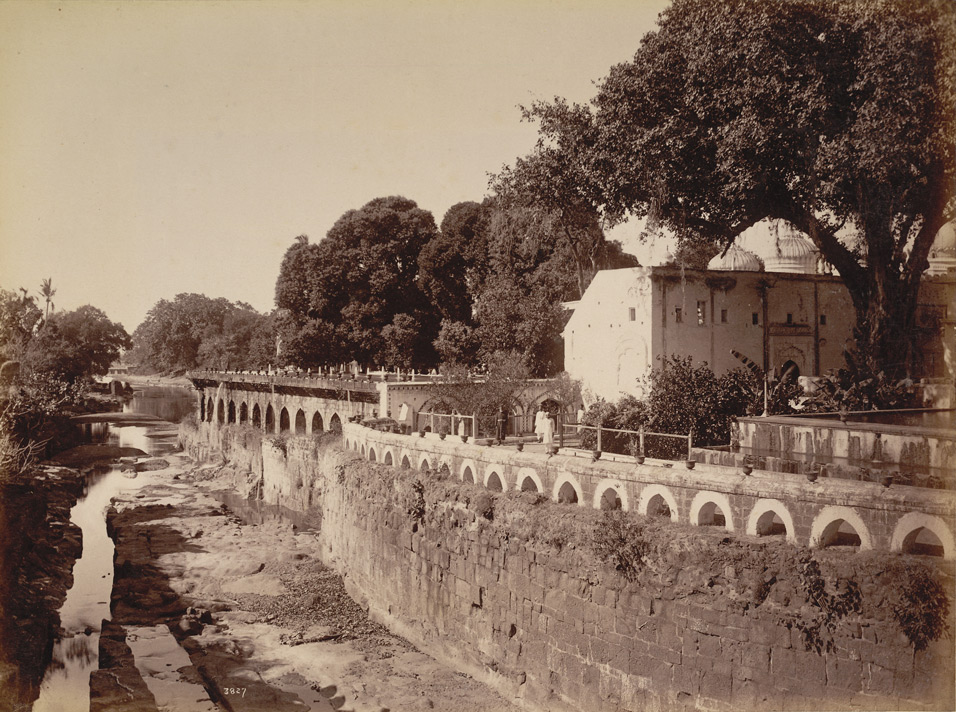
Panchakki, Baba Shah Mosafar Dargah 1880s

In March 1666, accompanied by a body of 1,000 select troops, Shivaji arrived at Aurangabad on his way to Agra. Safshikan Khan, the governor of Aurangabad, treated him with scant respect. For this act, he was severely reprimanded by Jai Singh and made to pay a courtesy call on Chatrapati Shivaji. In 1668, the city nearly became a scene of a conflict between the imperial troops under Diler Khan, and those commanded by Prince Muazzam, the viceroy. In 1681, after plundering Burhanpur, the Marathas assembled in the neighbourhood of the Satara hills in order to attack Aurangabad. The plan was, however, abandoned on hearing of the arrival of the viceroy, Khan Jahan Bahadur. In the same year, Khan Jahan Bahadur erected a wall around Aurangabad to protect it against surprise attacks of the Marathas. It was done at the order of the Emperor, and cost rupees three lakhs. Two years later, the Emperor himself arrived at Aurangabad.

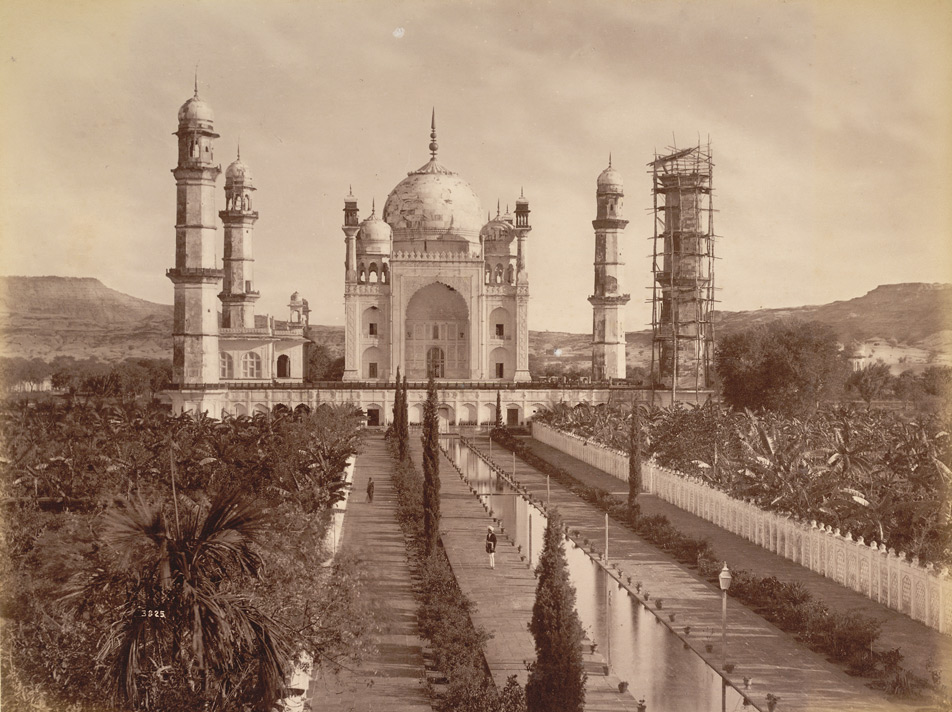
Bibi Ka Maqbara 1880s

Bibi Ka Maqbara is a monument built in 1660 by Aurangzeb's son Azam Shah to his mother, Dilras Bano Begam. In 1692, he ordered a magnificent palace to be erected near the great reservoir to the north of the city - the ruins of which are now to be seen in the Killa Ark. A fortified wall was thrown round the suburb of Begampura in 1696 AD. Shortly after the death of Aurangzeb, the city of Aurangabad slipped from the hands of the Moghals. In 1720, Nizam-ul-Mulk Asaf Jah, a distinguished General of Aurangzeb with the intention of founding his own dynasty in the Deccan, arrived at Aurangabad. He paid a visit to Delhi in 1723, but returned in 1724, defying the orders of Emperor Muhammad Shah. Nizam Ali Khan Asaf Jah II transferred his capital from Aurangabad to Hyderabad in 1763.

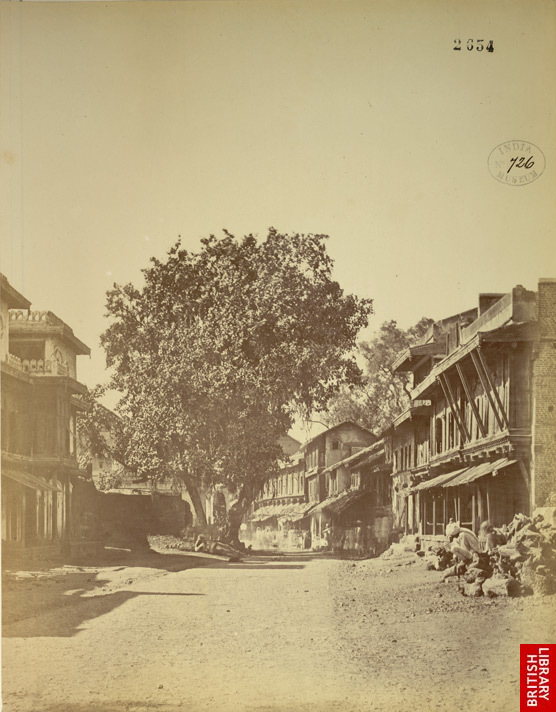
Street View Aurangabad 1868

The Emperor ordered Mubariz Khan, the Subhedar of the Deccan to oppose the Nizam. A battle was fought near Sakharkherda, subsequently called Fatehkherda, in which Murbariz Khan was defeated and killed. Raghoji, a young scion of the house of the Jadhavs of Sindkhed who fought on the side of the Moghals was also killed. Incensed at the support lent by the Jadhavs to Mubariz Khan, the Nizam despatched a posse of troops to Deulgaon to capture the Jadhav family. But being informed of the design the family escaped to Satara and sought asylum with Chhatrapati Shahu. At the intervention of Shahu the Jagir was restored back to the Jadhavs.

In 1853, Aurangabad was the scene of a conflict between the contingent troops and a body of Arab mercenaries (Chaush) belonging to Mansing Rav, the Raja of Devalgaon. The Arabs placed the Raja under restraint, and threatened his life because their pay was in arrears. Brigadier Mayne, commanding the station, being apprised of the situation, marched out in the first week of October, with the 5th regiment cavalry, 6th regiment infantry, and a battery of artillery to Jasvantpura, just outside the Roshangate, where the Arabs had posted themselves. After a stiff resistance, the Arabs were defeated and dispersed and the Raja was released. In the action that was fought the Contingent lost 15 killed and 40 were wounded. Among those killed was Lieut. Boswell, and among those wounded Lieut. Vaughan, and Captain Parker. Both of them succumbed to their wounds later.

== During 1857 rebellion ==
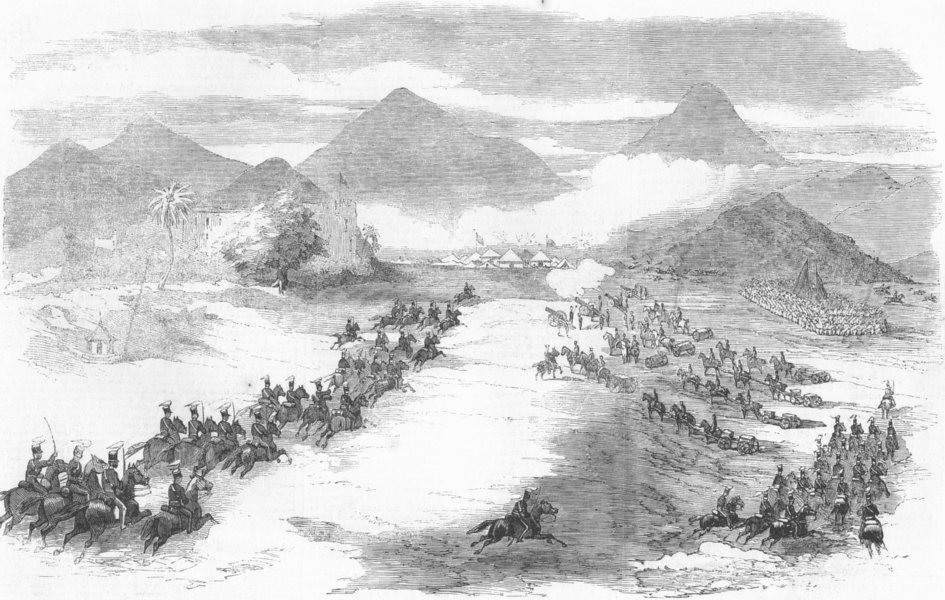
The Indian Mutiny: General Woodburn's Moveable Brigade Aurungabad 1857

The year 1857 was eventful in the history of Aurangabad with the rest of the country. The British moved the first cavalry from Mominabad (Ambejogai) to Aurangabad, in order to relieve 3rd cavalry which had marched to Malegaon, and was the first regiment to show signs of disaffection. The 2nd Infantry also came under suspicion. It was also feared that the people of the city might join hands with the troops. In order to prevent this, all the precautionary measures were taken and two companies of infantry were ordered to guard the bridge which spans the river Kham and separates the cantonment area from the spot where the cavalry was encamped. This precautionary measure on the part of the British alarmed the cavalry, and the men turning out without orders threw pickets in the direction of the cantonment. The authorities at Hyderabad were kept informed of the course of events by express. Upon this, a column of troops was ordered to march from Pune to Aurangabad. In the meanwhile, the artillery was also showing signs of rebellion, but the rumour of Bombay troops marching towards Aurangabad had a quieting effect. The men of the cavalry also returned to their posts.

The Pune force was under the command of General Woodburn, and consisted of three troops of, the 14th Hussars under Captain Gall, Captain Woodcombe's battery of European artillery, and the 24th Bombay infantry under Colonel Folliot. Upon his arrival, General Woodburn marched straight to the encampment of the 3rd Cavalry, and the disaffected regiment was ordered out to a dismounted parade. The rissaldar of the first troop was directed to call out the names of the revolutionaries, and commenced by giving the name of the senior jamadar, who ordered his men to load their carbines. By this time the General with his staff and the English officers were mixed up with the disaffected troops, and hence the guns could not be used to put down the latter. In the confusion that followed, some of the troopers broke away, ran to their horses and fled away. The guns were fired upon them and the Hussars were sent in pursuit; but several of them managed to escape. A dafadar of the cavalry, Mir Fida Ali by name, fired a shot at his commanding officer, Captain Abbott. For this act of his, he was tried by a drum-head court-martial and hanged. The court-martial continued its sittings, and 24 men were condemned, of whom 21 were shot and 3 blown away from guns. About two-thirds of the regiment which had remained quiet was marched to Edalabad and recruited to its full strength by men from the other three regiments of the cavalry. Subsequently, the third cavalry served throughout the campaign under Sir Hugh Rose.

== Gallery ==
Photographs taken by Lala Deen Dayal & others in the 19th century, sourced from the British Library, Views of HH the Nizam's Dominions, Hyderabad, Deccan.

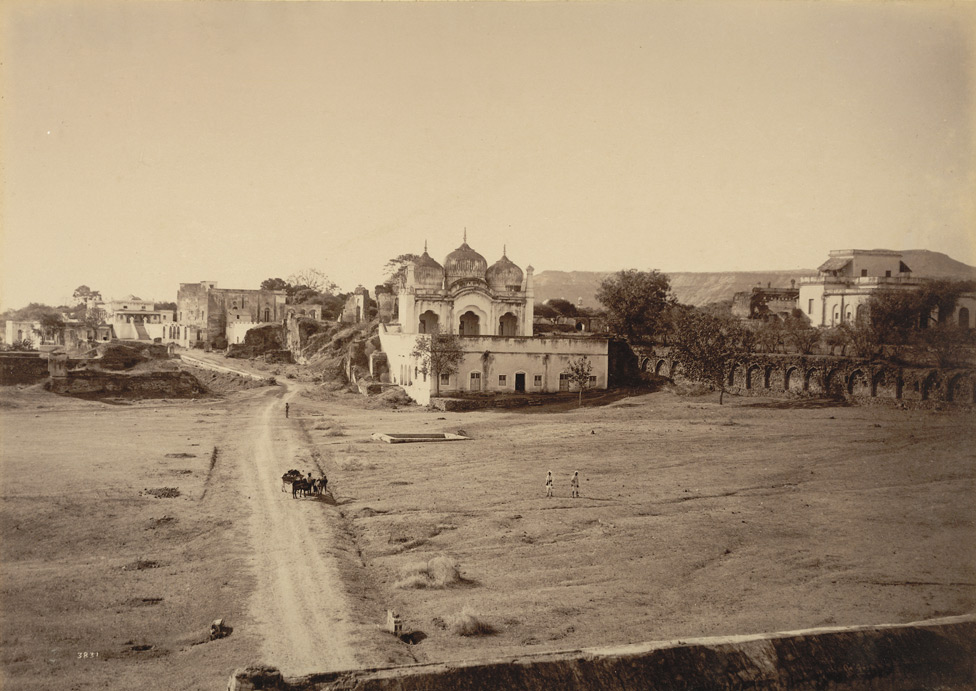
Alamgir mosque at Kila-e-Ark 1880s

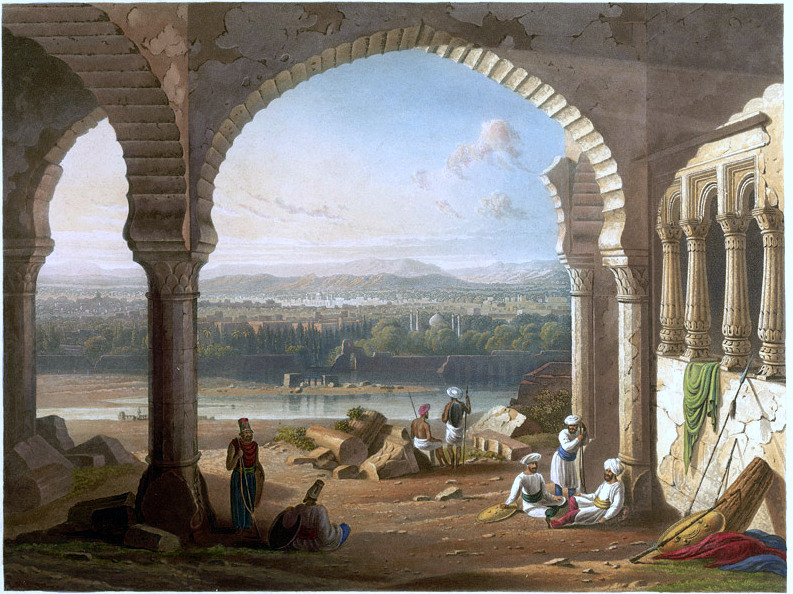
View of Begumpura from Aurangzeb's palace 1830s

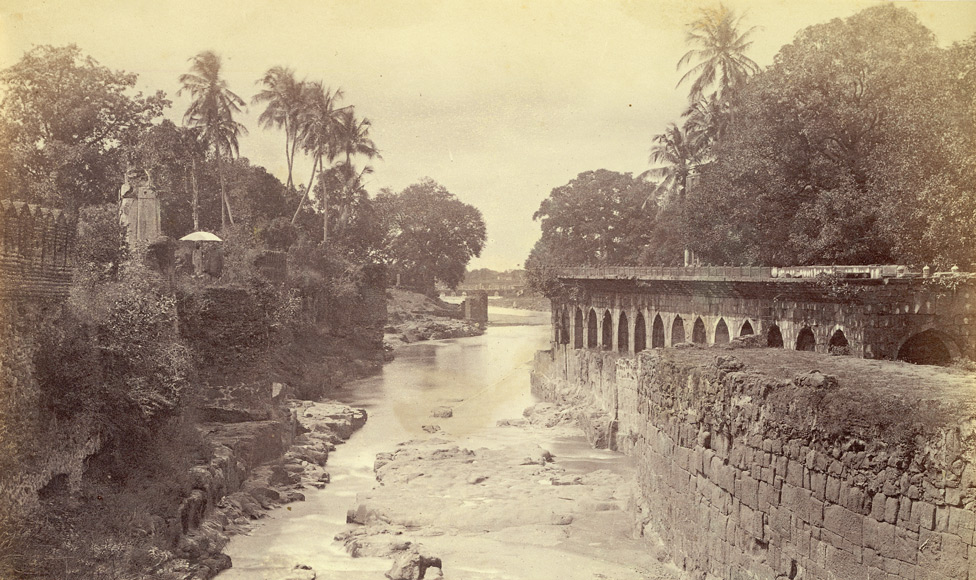
Kham river & city walls of Aurangabad 1860s

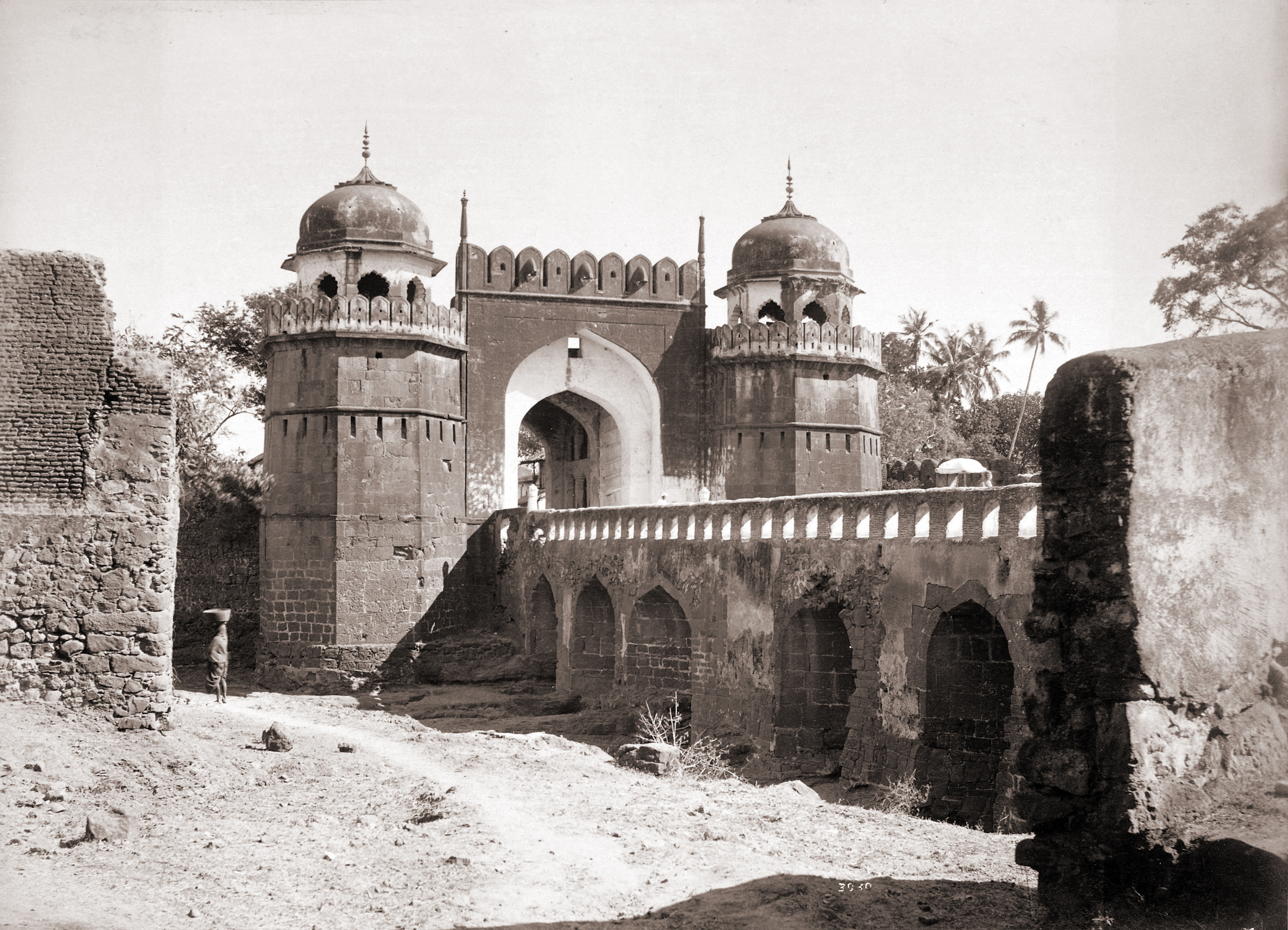
Mecca gate Aurangabad 1880s

== Travellers' accounts ==
Indeed, when Monsieur Thevenot visited Aurangabad it was not walled. Aurangzeb caused a wall to be built round the city in 1682, during the second viceroyalty of Khan Jahan, in order to protect it from the sporadic attacks of the Marathas. Begampura was similarly fortified in 1696. The city wall is terraced, and is of solid masonry. It is of no great height, at places not more than fourteen feet. The battlements are loopholed for musketry, and the merlins over the gateways and at certain places along the wall, are machicolated. Semicircular bastions surmounted by towers, occur at each flanking angle, and at regular intervals along the works. The total length of the wall is a little over six miles. The wall has not been able to survive the ravages of time and lies practically in rains. It was pierced with thirteen gateways, exclusive of a small postern wicket. The four principal gates faced the cardinal points and consisted of the Delhi gate on the north, the Jalna gate on the east, the Paithan gate on the south, and the Mecca gate on the west. Besides these, there were the Jaffar, Khirki, Barapul, Mahmud, Roshan, Khizi, Khadgar, Mada and Kumhar gates. The Barapul had also been walled up for some time; and at a distance of three-fourths of a mile from it, the city road runs through a large square stone gateway, called Barkul, ascribed to Malik Ambar. The town has spilt much beyond the fortifications.

Dr. Bradley in his 'Statistics of the City of Aurangabad' gives a picturesque description of the city and its environs as he viewed it from the tower upon the corner bastion at the north-east angle of the city wall: "Below is seen the town partly lying in the hollow and partly covering the high grounds rising all round, except towards the north-east and south-west, which is the direction of a valley where a perennial stream meanders. The buildings are neatly concealed in thick foliage, and were it not for a dome or minaret peering out here and there, the observer might imagine that he was gazing upon a forest. Beautiful clumps of mango and tamarind trees, upon the outskirts increase the illusion. Seldom is a more varied and beautiful landscape than is here presented; and the palms and minarets scattered about the town, confer a character peculiarly eastern upon the scenery. Looking westward beyond the city walls, the... cantonment is seen occupying a large space of ground. Further in the distance two or three isolated bills observed cutting the horizon. On the summit of one of them stands the remarkable fortress of Daulatabad; and behind it the bluff headland of the northern range fades way into misty indistinctness".
