= Jagdish and Kamla Mittal Museum of Indian Art =

Jagdish and Kamala Mittal Museum of Indian Art
- Established: 1976
- Location: Hyderabad, India
- Type: art and archaeological museum
- Website: http://www.mittalmuseum.com/

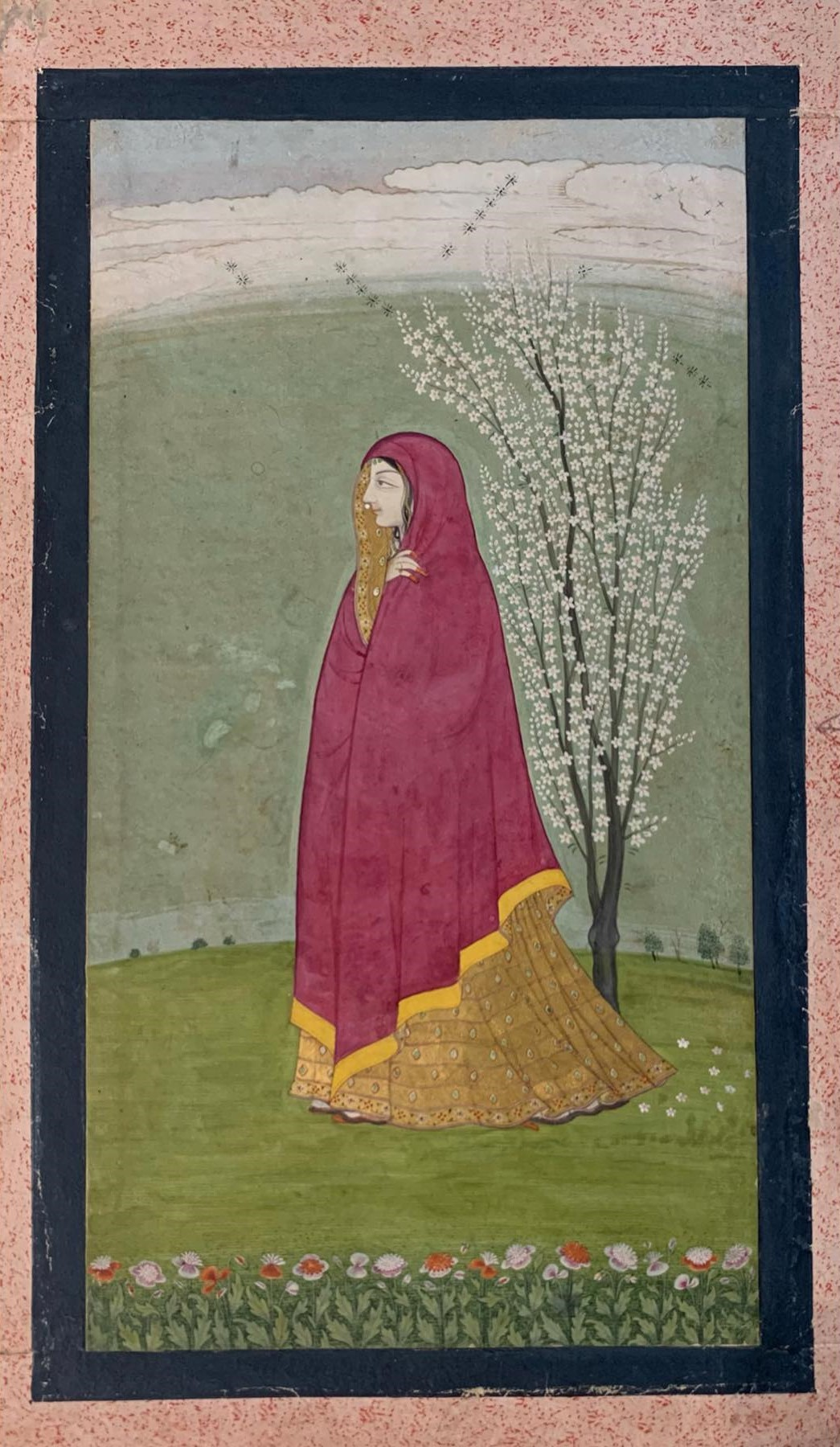
A Royal Lady Stands Beneath a Tree

The Jagdish and Kamla Mittal Museum of Indian Art is a museum in Hyderabad, India. It contains the personal art collection of Jagdish Mittal (1925-2025), and his late wife Kamla Mittal. Jagdish Mittal was himself an artist and has also been collecting art for decades. He is also a Padma Shri laureate.

In 1976, the couple decided to bequeath their art collection to the nation and instituted a public trust — Jagdish and Kamla Mittal Museum of Indian art – in Hyderabad. The museum's collection includes more than 2000 objects dated between 1 BCE and 1900 CE.

It consists of about 2000 objects which include miniature paintings and drawings (which form about fifty percent of the collection), manuscripts, Islamic calligraphy, folk and classical bronzes, terracottas, wood carving, ivory, glass, jade, metalware (in bronze, brass, copper, silver, bidri), and textiles.
