= Sultan Ibrahim Adil Shah II Playing the Tambur =

1590s painting by Farrukh Beg

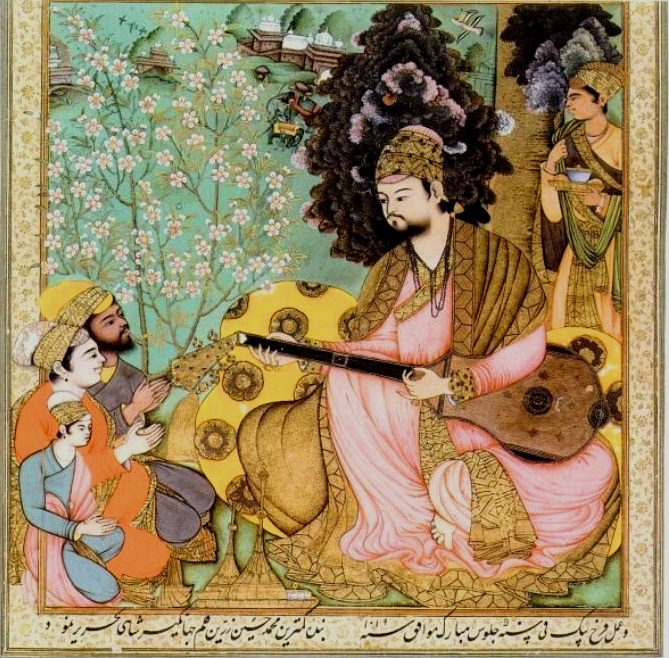
- Artist: Farrukh Beg
- Completion date: c. 1595 – 1600
- Medium: Ink, opaque watercolor, and gold on paper
- Movement: Deccan
- Location: Náprstek Museum, Prague

Sultan Ibrahim Adil Shah II Playing the Tambur is a 16th-century Deccan painting from India. It was painted by the Persian artist Farrukh Beg, during his tenure in the court of the Bijapur Sultanate. The painting portrays Ibrahim Adil Shah II, the sultan of the Bijapur Sultanate, playing the tambur. It is now in the Náprstek Museum in Prague (Czech title Portrét sultána Ibrahíma Ádilšáha II. z Bidžápuru, catalogue number A12182).

== Background ==
Farrukh Beg was a Persian miniature painter, who in 1590 migrated to Bijapur. This painting is one of the several works executed by him in Bijapur, under the patronage of the sultan Ibrahim Adil Shah II. Dated to 1595–1600 CE, it depicts the sultan, and this depiction is influenced by the sultan's account of himself in the 56th song of the Kitab-i Nauras. Therein, he describes himself as a Hindu god, clad in saffron, with a rosary around his neck, holding a musical instrument in one hand and a book in the other. The song also identifies him as the son of Saraswati and Ganesha.

The work was taken by Farrukh to the Mughal court upon his return from Bijapur, where it was mounted onto an album along with European works. A Persian inscription on the border identifies the subject of the painting as "Ibrahim Adil Khan Deccani, governor of Bijapur", and attributes it to Farrukh. This inscription is dated to the fifth regnal year of the Mughal emperor Jahangir, which corresponds to 1610–11 CE. The inscription is markedly Mughal, since the Mughals referred to the rulers of the Bijapur Sultanate as governors, rather than monarchs in their own right. Furthermore, Ibrahim is referred to by the lesser title of Khan, as opposed to the royal title of Shah.

== Description ==
The painting occupies the lower part of the folio (while the upper part contains two European engravings of saints, Francis of Assisi and Catherine of Siena). It portrays Ibrahim, lounging upon a pillow and playing the tambur, as three courtiers to his left are listening and clapping along to the music. Ibrahim has a beard and is wearing prayer beads around his neck. He is wearing a thick jama, which might be made for cooler temperatures. The instrument rests upon one of his knees, which is raised. Ibrahim is larger than the courtiers, in accordance with hierarchical proportion. From the way he holds the instrument, it can be inferred that the sultan was left-handed. A bolster separates Ibrahim and his courtiers from the nature in the background. Also in the background are a standing servant, several small elephants, and European-styled white palace buildings atop hilltops.

The reduced scale of the trees corresponds to European perspective, and this leads the art historian Mark Zebrowski to posit that the artists of the court of Bijapur may have been influenced by European artworks acquired from Portuguese Goa.
