= Migration of Iranians to India during the 16th–18th centuries =

Iranian migration to the Indian subcontinent increased significantly after Muslim governments were established, especially during the Delhi Sultanate (1206–1526) and more prominently from the second half of the 16th century under the Mughal Empire and the Deccan sultanates (Ahmadnagar, Bijapur, and Golconda). Iranian immigrants — including administrators, officials, scholars, poets, Sufis, craftsmen, artisans, artists, and traders — were attracted by the Persian language and cultural influence at these royal courts, which welcomed them and granted important positions. Most Iranian immigrants came from elite backgrounds rather than nomadic or rural ones. They were generally divided into two groups: those forced to relocate due to religious persecution, war, or oppression, who sought refuge in India permanently; and those who voluntarily moved seeking better opportunities, often maintaining ties with Iran and sometimes relocating between Indian courts. The Mughal courts, especially under rulers like Humayun, Akbar, Jahangir, and Shah Jahan, featured Iranians in key administrative and cultural roles, with many Iranian poets and officials playing a dominant role in court life.

Of the three main Deccan sultanates, Iranian supremacy at the Golconda court turned out to be the most enduring. As several notable Telugu Niyogi Brahmin families rose to importance in the 1670s, their influence started to somewhat decline. Regardless, as long as the Deccan sultanates existed, the Iranian influence persisted in some manner. During the late 18th century, when neither the Deccan sultanates nor the Safavid dynasty existed anymore, the Iranians still continued to play an important part in the Hyderabad State (1724–1948) ruled by the Sunni Asaf Jahi dynasty.

== Reasons for immigration ==
Map of Safavid Iran and its surroundings, including the Mughal Empire to its east

Since the time Muslim governments were established in the Indian subcontinent, migration from the Iranian plateau appears to have increased significantly. By the 13th and 14th centuries, the court of the Delhi Sultanate (1206–1526) hosted Iranian immigrants who already held important roles. During the brief reign of Nasir ad-Din Qabacha (r. 1205–1228), several leading Iranian writers were present at his court, including Muhammad Aufi, who there composed the first major Persian tazkera (anthology), Lubab ul-Albab ("The essence of wisdom").

A new stage of Iranian immigration began in the second half of the 16th century. Administrators, officials, scholars, poets, Sufis, craftsmen, artisans, artists, and traders were amongst the many different backgrounds of the Iranians that moved to India. They sought favor at the royal courts of the Mughal Empire in northern India, as well as the Adilshahis and Qutbshahis in the Deccan region, due to their Persianate culture. These courts readily accepted the majority of migrants, giving them important positions. The majority of these Iranian immigrants were members of the elite, rather than from a nomadic or rural background.

Iranian immigrants were generally divided into two groups. The first group consisted of immigrants who had been forced to relocate due to religious persecution, war or oppression. For them, India served as a place to seek refuge, never returning to Iran. This was not unique to this period, as it could occur anyplace at any time in history. Amongst these immigrants were Zoroastrians, Ismailis and Sunnis. The royal courts in India were willing to accept anyone as long as they had skills in a particular sector since they considered talent to be of high importance. Religious differences were not taken too serious in India. The second group consisted of immigrants who voluntarily relocated after failing to thrive in their own country. They could stay in contact with their friends and family, and even return to Iran. Occasionally, this group would relocate between Indian courts. Whether they served the Safavid dynasty in Iran or a dynasty in India was of little importance to the Persian-speaking notables familiar with court life. A saying had been coined that, for them, "India was a source of fortune."

However, many Iranians were disappointed by the lack of success in India, with some returning home. Biographers sometimes described Iranian immigrant poets as "falling to India," indicating the difficulties these poets faced in the country as well as possibly referencing Adam's fall from heaven. Although India was widely seen as a tolerant society, it was still susceptible to greed, jealousy, tyranny, and even discrimination based on faith, to the point where some Shia Muslim emigrants had to hide their negative sentiments about the country. Poets such as Amani Esfahani openly expressed this, which contemporary biographers commended. Indians eventually started accusing Iranian immigrants of being unappreciative due to their criticism of the country. Regardless, the success stories of some Iranians in India continued to encourage others to immigrate in hopes of achieving similar success.

At the same time, a similar situation was taking place at the court of the Ottoman Empire, where Iranian immigrants were also accepted due to being fluent in Persian and familiar with their literary tradition.

== In the Mughal Empire ==
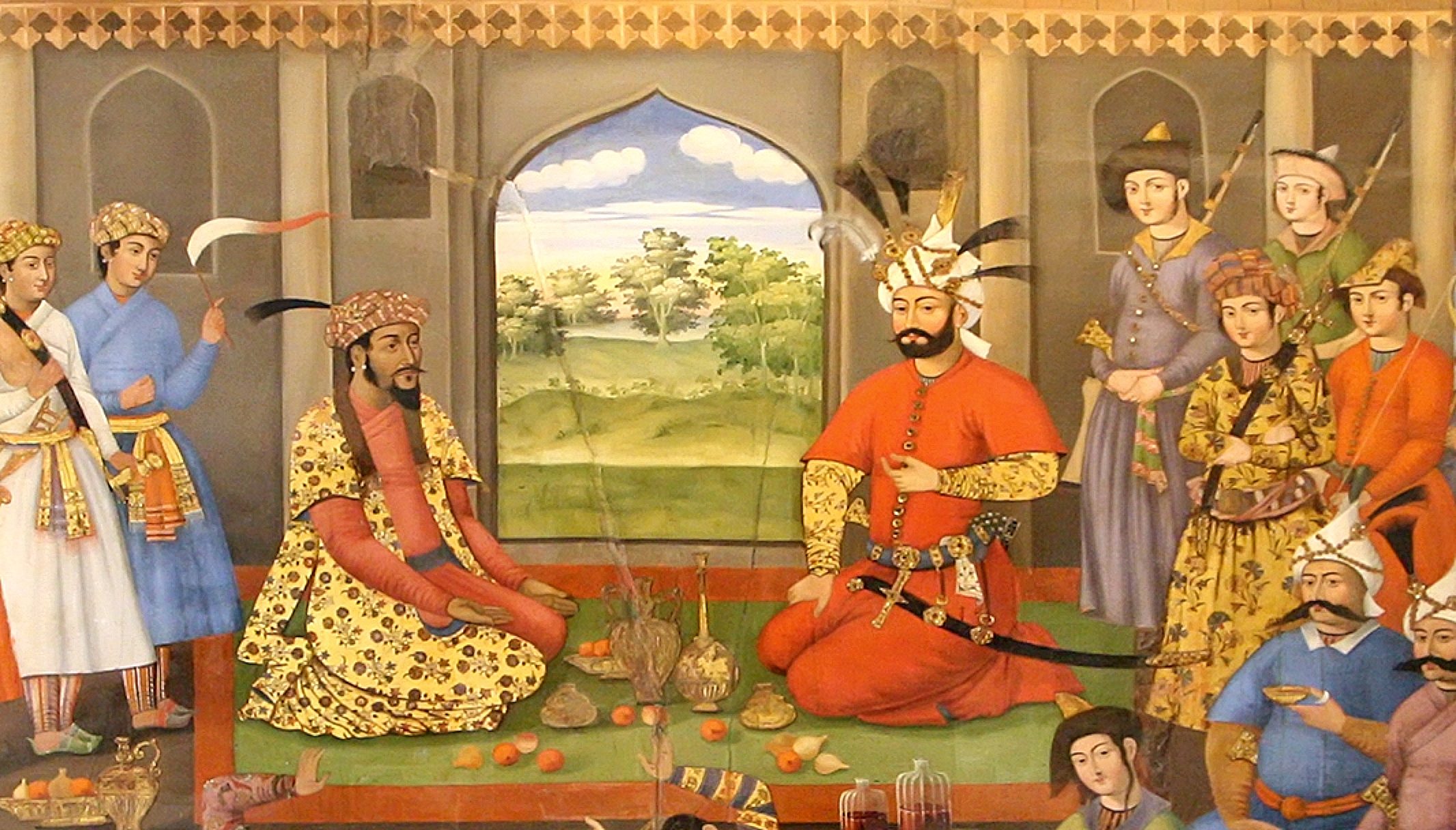
Meeting between the exiled Mughal emperor Humayun and the Safavid ruler Shah Tahmasp I. Dated 1647, located in the Chehel Sotoun, Isfahan

Under the first Mughal ruler, Babur (r. 1526–1530), most of his entourage were from Central Asia. His move to Delhi in 1526 marked the start of a Persian literary culture in the Mughal realm. The Iranians first arrived later, under his son and successor Humayun (r. 1530–1540, 1555–1556). From 1540 to 1555, the latter was forced into a long exile, which included a brief visit to the Safavid court in Tabriz. After Shah Tahmasp I (r. 1524–1576) helped Humayun restore his rule, he brought a number of Iranians with him, including the two great artists Abd al-Samad and Mir Sayyid Ali as well as a number of poets, including Qasim Kahi. This marked the start of a tightly connected Iranian-Indian relationship that would last for just over a century and have a lasting impact on both societies. Although Iranian immigrant poets and Persophone Indians collaborated to create literary works that best reflected and aided the political and cultural goals of the Mughal dynasty, the early Mughal court's literary culture was largely marked by conflict between the two groups.

The Iranians did not have a special pattern when it came to their positions. They held important offices including vakil (regent), vazir (prime minister), mir bakhshi (chief officer in charge of military department), sadr (chief officer in charge of religious affairs and endowments), local governor and local financial and military officer, as well as offices in the royal palace, including mir-saman (master of royal household department), mirtozuk (master of ceremonies at the court), mir-akhwor (master of royal stables) and qush-begi (master of royal aviaries). The Mughal system of recruiting was heavily influenced by ethnic factors. It was generally more likely for an Iranian captain to become a mansabdar than an Indian Muslim, especially a Kashmiri. Only the royal Mughal family itself was paid more than the Iranians.

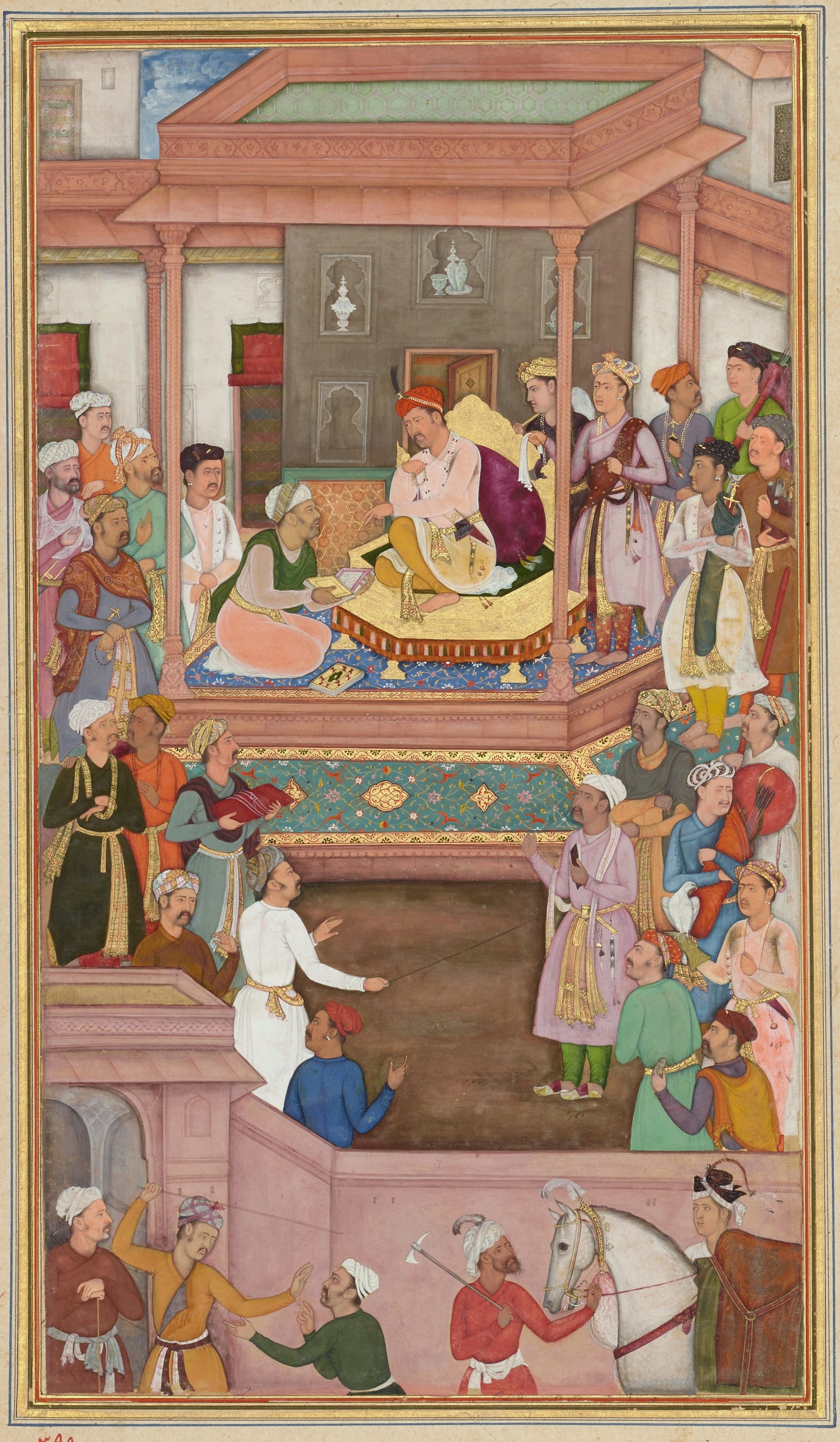
Abul Fazl presenting the Akbarnama to Akbar, dated 1603–1605

Under Humayun's son and successor Akbar (r. 1556–1605), almost every group from the nobility (Iranians, Central Asians, Hindus and Indian Muslims) got to serve as a minister. During his reign, the office of malik al-shu'ara (poet laureate) was created, existing only for the duration of his rule. All holders except Faizi were Iranian, including Ghazali Mashhadi, Husain Sana'i, Taleb Amoli, Kalim Kashani, and Qodsi Mashhadi. The Akbarnama, which was the official chronicle of Akbar's rule, was written in Persian by Abul Fazl. By this period, the emperor, the royal family, and the upper nobility had come to speak Persian. The native Hindus, who had previously conducted formal affairs in Hindi, managed a large part of the administration. Their adoption of Persian influenced the growth of Persian literary culture more than the Iranian poets residing in India. They afterwards worked alongside Iranians as clerks, scribes, and secretaries. Influenced by the Iranian Fathullah Shirazi, Akbar overhauled the primary and secondary education system, thereby further promoting the spread of Persian language and learning.

Under Akbar's son and successor Jahangir (r. 1605–1627), only Iranians were appointed as his vakils and in his divan (with the exception of Wazir ul-Mulk who shared the position for a year). By the second year of Jahangir's reign and onwards, all of his mir bakhshis were Iranians. However, since the sadr office was mainly reserved for Sunnis due to its semi-religious role, not many Iranians held it, due to mainly being Shias. Two Iranians held the office for nine years under Akbar, and one Iranian for three years under Jahangir. The friendly environment created by Jahangir's primary wife, Nur Jahan, was a major factor in the Iranian population's ongoing strong migration in the first half of the 17th century. Coming from an Iranian immigrant background herself, she had empathy for her people. For renowned Iranian intellectuals, her wide network of family relatives in high imperial positions offered numerous appealing chances to thrive.

Under Jahangir's son and successor Shah Jahan (r. 1628–1658), the Iranians continued to hold dominance, with the office of vakil only being held by Nur Jahan's brother Abu'l-Hasan Asaf Khan. The first divan of Shah Jahan was the Indian Muslim Wazir Khan who held it for a year, and another Indian Muslim Saadullah Khan also held the office from 1646/47 to 1655/56, both being from Punjab. Besides that, the office was held by Iranians. While chroniclers and historians were becoming more and more Indian, the leading twelve court poets were nearly all Iranians. By the end of Shah Jahan's reign, the demographics of the poets had shifted to a sizeable majority of Persophone Indians, in contrast to the earlier Iranian dominance. Shah Jahan's son and successor Aurangzeb (r. 1658–1707) did not display the same enthusiasm towards poetry as his predecessors had. By this time, the Iranian poets formed a minority. Ashraf Mazandarani, one of the last leading Iranian émigré poets at the Mughal court, was appointed by Aurangzeb as the tutor of his eldest daughter Zeb-un-Nissa. Javaher Raqam Tabrizi, who had left Iran after being invited by Shah Jahan, was the teacher and main librarian of Aurangzeb.

=== Numbers ===
The Ma'asir al-umara is a renowned biography of notables in the Mughal Empire from the time of its establishment until 1780, the date it was completed by Abdul Hai Khan. It was begun by his father Samsam ud Daula Shah Nawaz Khan, who belonged to a family descended from Iranian immigrants. At least 198 (26.8%) of the 738 notables listed in the Ma'asir al-umara were either Iranian immigrants or their descendants. Since the origins of 205 listed individuals remain unclear, this figure may be much larger. This ratio is consistent with the number of Iranian elites found in earlier studies. The percentage of Iranian elites who went by the name "Irani" was 25.5 percent in 1575–1595, 28.4 percent in 1647–1648, 27.8 percent in 1658–1678, and 21.9 percent in 1679–1707.

In Safavid Iran, Tajiks (ethnic Persians) mainly served in the bureaucracy, while Turks mainly served in the military, although these roles were not strictly restricted and individuals could move between them. In the Ma'asir al-umara, Tajiks made up 165 of the 198 notables listed, while Turks made up 14. This could be because individual immigration was uncommon amongst Turks, due to mainly being tribal, and because a nomadic lifestyle was unsuitable due to India's weather. The primary reason, however, was that the Mughal Empire highly regarded Persian-speaking individuals with bureaucratic abilities and an extensive knowledge of Persian culture due to Persian being the language of their court and administration. Members of the Safavid dynasty made up 10, with all of them being descended from Soltan Hosayn Mirza Safavi.

Tajiks
Region	Place name	Number of people
Eastern region	Esfarayen	1
Eastern region	Herat	20
Eastern region	Joveyn	1
Eastern region	Kerman	1
Eastern region	Khorasan	5
Eastern region	Khaf	19
Eastern region	Lar	1
Eastern region	Mashhad	20
Eastern region	Nishapur	11
Eastern region	Kandahar	4
Eastern region	Quhestan	1
Eastern region	Sabzevar	7
Eastern region	Sistan	1
Eastern region	Tun	3
Eastern region	Torbat	4
Eastern region	Yazd	14
Central and Northern region	Amol	1
Central and Northern region	Ardestan	2
Central and Northern region	Isfahan	10
Central and Northern region	Gilan	6
Central and Northern region	Kashan	3
Central and Northern region	Qazvin	5
Central and Northern region	Saveh	4
Central and Northern region	Shiraz	10
Central and Northern region	Tehran	8
Western region	Shirvan	1
Western region	Shushtar	1
Western region	Tabriz	1
Turks
Tribe name		Number of people
Afshar		2
Zu'l-Qadr		2
Qaramanlu		3
Qara Qoyunlu		5
Ustajlu		2
Others
Group		Number of people
Safavid dynasty		10
?		9

== In the Deccan ==
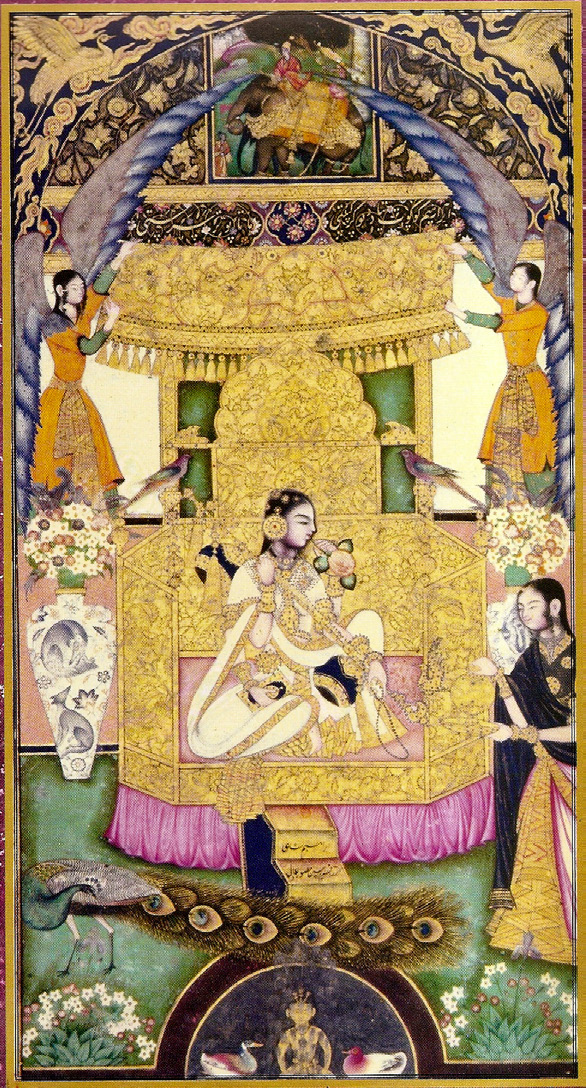
Saraswati Enthroned, made by the Iranian immigrant Farrukh Beg in c. 1595–1609 at Bijapur.

The establishment of the Safavid dynasty in Iran coincided with the establishment of the three Deccan sultanates: Ahmadnagar, Bijapur, and Golconda. Unlike in the Mughal Empire, where more literature is available, determining the Iranian presence in the Deccan is more difficult. Some Iranians spent their time both in the Mughal and Deccan courts, such as Muhammad Zuhuri, a leading Persian poet of the Deccan. A native of Torshiz, he moved to Ahmadnagar in 1580, eventually becoming the poet laureate of Murtaza Nizam Shah I (r. 1565–1588). Zuhuri became close to another Iranian, Malek Qommi, who gave his daughter in marriage.

During the late 1580s when Ahmadnagar was in chaos, Malek Qommi went to Bijapur, followed by Zuhuri in 1595. There Zuhuri gained the favour of Ibrahim Adil Shah II (r. 1580–1627), possibly with Qummi's help. Zuhuri wrote a panegyric on the six closest friends of his patron, which besides Malek Qommi, also included other Iranians, such as the prime minister Shah Navaz Khan, painter Farrukh Beg, and calligrapher Khalilullah Butshikan. Zuhuri's son Zahur (possibly also Qummi's grandson) served under Ibrahim Adil Shah II's son and successor Mohammed Adil Shah of Bijapur (r. 1627–1656) and was the author of the chronicle Muhammadnama.

Although Golconda was initially a little more difficult to reach than its western neighbors, it also turned out to be a region of appeal for Iranian migrants. In the late 1580s or early 1590s, royal ships were dispatched from Masulipatnam to Jeddah in the Red Sea, thus establishing the first direct maritime route between Golconda and the Middle East. Three decades later, a route between Golconda and the Bandar Abbas port in the Persian Gulf was established with the help of Mir Kamal al-Din Mazandarani, a ship-owning entrepreneur. As a result, the majority of Iranians in Golconda must have traveled through the Deccan after passing through ports like Dabhol, Chaul, or, less frequently, Goa. A notable Iranian immigrant who did this was Mustafa Khan Ardistani, who was appointed mir jumla (head of finance) in 1563 by Ibrahim Quli Qutb Shah Wali (r. 1550–1580). In a letter to Shah Tahmasp I, he promised to stay loyal despite his extended absence from the Safavid court. For the next fifty years, this pattern of double loyalties persisted, including by Mir Mu'min Astarabadi, the peshva and vazir in Golconda during the early 17th century.

Of the three main Deccan sultanates, Iranian supremacy at the Golconda court turned out to be the most enduring. As several notable Telugu Niyogi Brahmin families rose to importance in the 1670s, their influence started to somewhat decline. Regardless, as long as the Deccan sultanates existed, the Iranian influence persisted in some manner. During the late 18th century, when neither the Deccan sultanates nor the Safavid dynasty existed anymore, the Iranians still continued to play an important part in the Hyderabad State (1724–1948) ruled by the Sunni Asaf Jahi dynasty.

== Sources ==
- Alam, Muzaffar (2003). "The Culture and Politics of Persian in Precolonial Hindustan". In Pollock, Sheldon (ed.). Literary Cultures in History: Reconstructions from South Asia. University of California Press. pp. 131–198. ISBN 978-0520228214.
- Athar Ali, M. (1985). The Apparatus of Empire: Awards of Ranks, Offices and Titles to the Mughal Nobility (1574 - 1658). Oxford University Press. ISBN 978-1580535335.
- Eaton, Richard M. (1983). "ʿĀdelšāhīs". In Yarshater, Ehsan (ed.). Encyclopædia Iranica (Online ed.). Brill.
- Eaton, Richard M. (1984). "Akbar-nāma". In Yarshater, Ehsan (ed.). Encyclopædia Iranica (Online ed.). Encyclopædia Iranica Foundation. ISBN 978-0710090966.
- Fischel, Roy S. (2020). Local States in an Imperial World: Identity, Society and Politics in the Early Modern Deccan. Edinburgh University Press. ISBN 978-1474436083.
- Haneda, Masashi (1997). "Emigration of Iranian Elites to India during the 16th–18th Centuries". In Szuppe, Maria (ed.). L'heritage timouride: Iran – Asie Centrale – Inde, XVIe – XVIIIe siècles. Cahiers d’Asie Centrale. Vol. 3–4. pp. 129–143. ISBN 978-2857449553.
- Haneda, Masashi (2004). "India xxviii. Iranian Immigrants in India". In Yarshater, Ehsan (ed.). Encyclopædia Iranica (Online ed.). Brill.
- Losensky, Paul (2021). "Not all of the poets went to India: literary culture in Iran under Safavid rule". In Matthee, Rudi (ed.). The Safavid World. Routledge. pp. 447–468. ISBN 978-1138944060.
- Overton, Keelan (2020). "Introduction to Iranian Mobilities and Persianate Mediations in the Deccan". In Overton, Keelan (ed.). Iran and the Deccan: Persianate Art, Culture, and Talent in Circulation, 1400–1700. Indiana University Press. pp. 3–76. ISBN 978-0253048912.
- Matthee, Rudi (2008). "Safavid dynasty". In Yarshater, Ehsan (ed.). Encyclopædia Iranica (Online ed.). Brill.
- Perry, John R. (1979). Karim Khan Zand: A History of Iran, 1747–1779. University of Chicago Press. ISBN 978-0226660981.
- Perry, John R. (2022). "Sir William Jones and the Migration of the Idea of Iran to India". In Melville, Charles Melville (ed.). The Contest for Rule in Eighteenth-Century Iran: Idea of Iran Vol. 11. I.B.Tauris. pp. 215–226. ISBN 978-0755645992.
- Shafieioun, Saeid (2019). "Some Critical Remarks on the Migration of Iranian Poets to India in the Safavid Era". Journal of Persianate Studies. 11 (2). Brill: 155–174. doi:10.1163/18747167-12341327.
- Sharma, Sunil (2011). "Ashraf Māzandarānī". In Fleet, Kate; Krämer, Gudrun; Matringe, Denis; Nawas, John; Rowson, Everett (eds.). Encyclopaedia of Islam (3rd ed.). Brill Online. ISSN 1873-9830.
- Sharma, Sunil (2017). Mughal Arcadia - Persian Literature in an Indian Court. Harvard University Press. ISBN 9780674975859.
- Subrahmaniyam, Sanjay (2020). "Iran and the Doors to the Deccan, ca. 1400–1650: Some Aspects". In Overton, Keelan (ed.). Iran and the Deccan: Persianate Art, Culture, and Talent in Circulation, 1400–1700. Indiana University Press. pp. 77–104. ISBN 978-0253048912.
- White, James (2023). Persian and Arabic Literary Communities in the Seventeenth Century: Migrant Poets Between Arabia, Iran and India. I.B. Tauris. ISBN 978-0755644568.
