= Khalilullah Butshikan =

Iranian calligrapher in Safavid Iran and the Sultanate of Bijapur

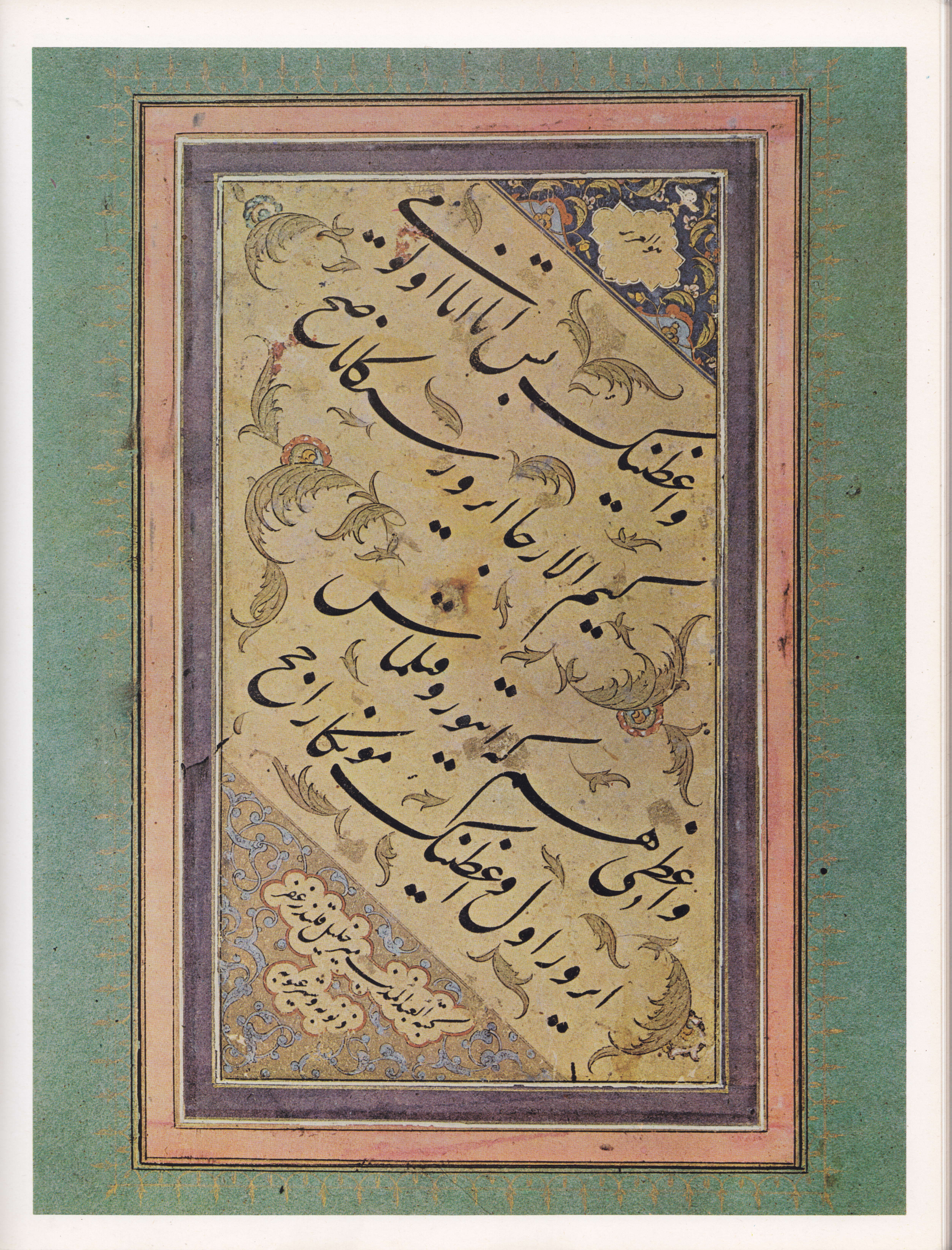
- An illuminated panel in the nastaliq script, signed by Khalilullah Butshikan, 17th century
- Born: 1552/53; Bakharz, Safavid Iran
- Died: 1625/26; Sultanate of Bijapur
- Education: School of Mir Ali Heravi
- Family: Muhammad Husayn Rizayi (uncle); Mir Sana'i Bakharzi (ancestor)

Khalilullah Butshikan (Note: Also known as Mir Khalil Bakharzi (میر خلیل بخارزی) and Mir Khalilullah (میر خلیل‌الله).) (Persian: خلیل‌الله بت‌شکن; 1552/1553–1625/26), was an Iranian calligrapher in Safavid Iran and the Sultanate of Bijapur.

== Biography ==
A native of Bakharz in Khorasan, he was born in 1552/1553 to a seyyed family (descendants of the Islamic prophet Muhammad). He was the nephew of the calligrapher Muhammad Husayn Rizayi (fl. 1495–1591) and descended from Mir Sana'i Bakharzi, who served as the minister of the Timurid ruler Sultan Husayn Bayqara (r. 1469–1506). Since Khalilullah was interested in mysticism and was sometimes referred to as "Shah Khalilullah", it has been suggested that he was a descendant of the Nimatullahi leader Shah Nimatullah Wali and his son Shah Khalilullah "Butshikan".

The cities of Mashhad and Herat was were Khalilullah spent his early years. He studied in the school of the calligrapher Mir Ali Heravi. He was later appointed as the teacher of prince (later known as Shah Abbas I). After the prince was crowned shah of Iran in October 1587, Khalilullah did not stay at the court in Qazvin, but instead immigrated to India for unknown reasons. He entered under the service of Ibrahim Adil Shah II (r. 1580–1627), the ruler of the Sultanate of Bijapur. There he reached a prominent status, as described by Ibrahim Zubayri;

"Everyone who studied and learned that art under him took pride in having personally apprenticed with him. Also, some of the enchanting, sweet-penned calligraphers, masters, and accomplished ones in every art came together in that period, renowned in the perfection of all arts from East to West. . . . While calligraphers from other climes had come [to Bijapur] at that time, their king was the “Padishah of the Pen” [Khalilullah]. He raised suls (thuluth), naskh, and nasta‘liq to a degree of firmness and beauty that far eclipsed other calligraphers of the era."

In 1609/10, Ibrahim Adil Shah II sent Khalilullah as his ambassador to Iran, where he stayed until 1614/15. In 1618, Khalilullah made a nastaliq copy of the Kitab-i Nauras by Ibrahim Adil Shah II. The latter showed his gratitude by having Khalilullah sit on his throne, declaring him "Padishah of the Pen." Since the early Islamic era, it had been traditional to give honorific titles to calligraphers. Khalilullah was soon afterwards send as an ambassador to Iran again, returning in 1619/20.

Khalilullah died in 1625/26.

== Sources ==
- Ghelichkhani, Hamidreza (2020). "Khalilullah "Padishah of the Pen": Royal Scribe and Ambassador of Shah 'Abbas and Ibrahim 'Adil Shah II". In Overton, Keelan (ed.). Iran and the Deccan: Persianate Art, Culture, and Talent in Circulation, 1400–1700. Indiana University Press. pp. 367–400. ISBN 978-0253048912.
- Overton, Keelan (2020). "Introduction to Iranian Mobilities and Persianate Mediations in the Deccan". In Overton, Keelan (ed.). Iran and the Deccan: Persianate Art, Culture, and Talent in Circulation, 1400–1700. Indiana University Press. pp. 3–76. ISBN 978-0253048912.
- Subrahmaniyam, Muzaffar Alam Sanjay (2020). "Iran and the Doors to the Deccan, ca. 1400–1650: Some Aspects". In Overton, Keelan (ed.). Iran and the Deccan: Persianate Art, Culture, and Talent in Circulation, 1400–1700. Indiana University Press. pp. 77–104. ISBN 978-0253048912.
