= Saraswati Enthroned =

Deccan painting of goddess Saraswati

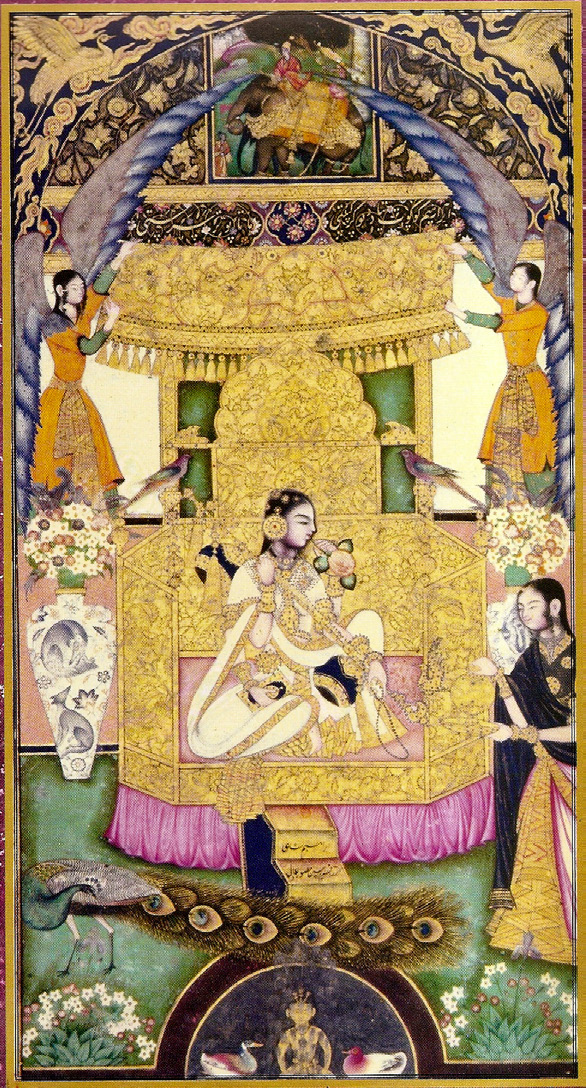
- Artist: Farrukh Husayn
- Dimensions: 23.6 cm × 15.8 cm
- Location: City Palace, Jaipur

Saraswati Enthroned, also known as The Goddess Saraswati Enthroned and Saraswati Plays on a Vina, (Note: Keelan Overton mentions it as "Saraswati enthroned", B. N. Goswamy mentions it as "The Goddess Saraswati Enthroned", and Navina Najat Haidar mentions it as "Saraswati Plays on a Vina".) is a Deccan painting of the Bijapur school. Dated to about the beginning of the 17th century, the painting was commissioned in the Bijapur Sultanate during the reign of Ibrahim Adil Shah II.

Executed in opaque watercolour, the painting depicts the Hindu goddess Saraswati, seated upon a throne, playing the veena.

== Background ==
The painting is dated to about the beginning of the 17th century. It was commissioned in the Bijapur Sultanate by the ruler, Ibrahim Adil Shah II.

The painting is signed by the artist Farrukh Husayn. It is posited by various scholars that Farrukh Husayn is another name of the Persian artist Farrukh Beg, who spent several years in Bijapur.

== Description ==
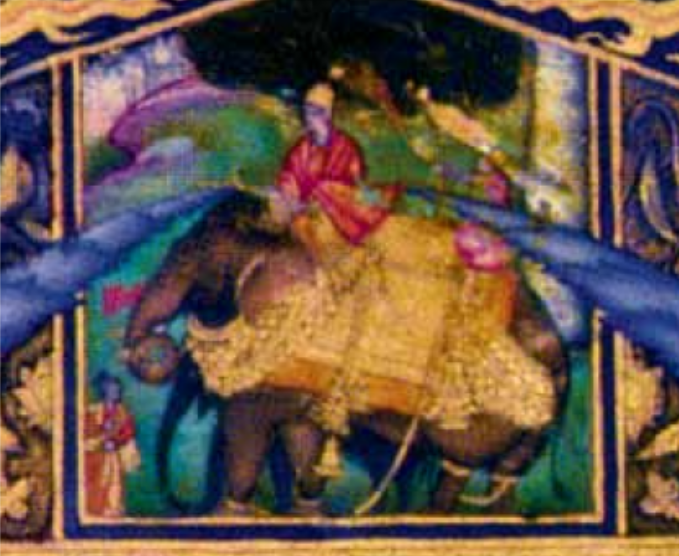
Panel on top of the arch in "Saraswati enthroned"

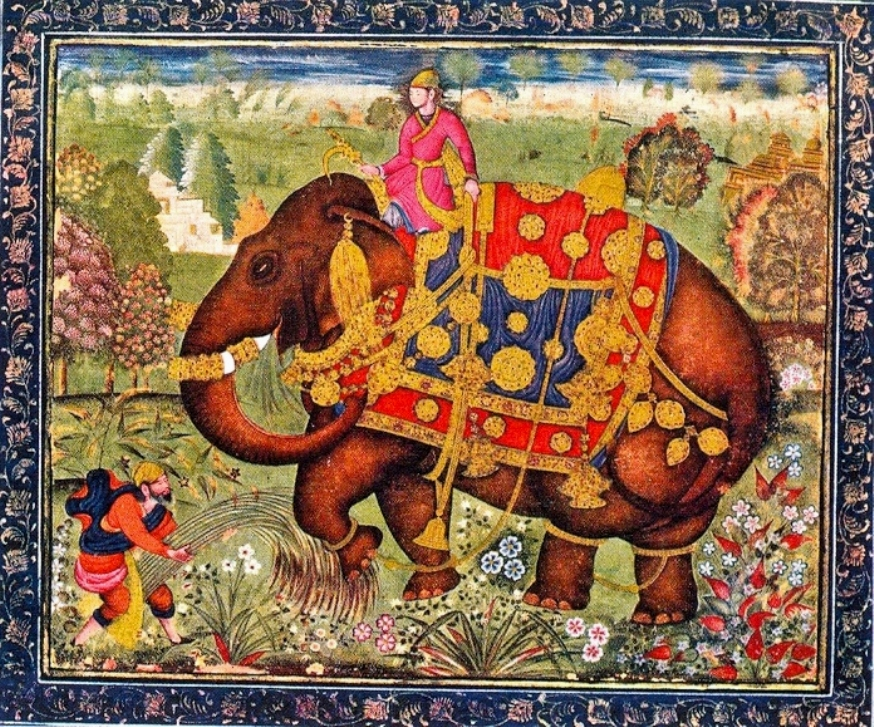
Ibrahim Riding on Atash Khan

The panel on the top of the arch is a reference to the painting "Ibrahim Riding on Atash Khan", also by Farrukh Husayn.

The background of the painting consists of a large arch reminiscent of a pishtaq. The spandrels of this arch contain swans. A panel, on the cusp of the arch, depicts a rider atop an elephant. This is a reference to another Bijapur painting, which depicts Ibrahim riding his favourite elephant Atash Khan.

The central figure of the painting is the Hindu goddess Saraswati. The depiction of the goddess does not follow traditional iconographic models. Instead, it is based upon her description in Ibrahim's book Kitab-i Nauras, wherein she is described as a "fully-blossomed white flower". Closely following her description in the Kitab, she is shown in her four-armed form, wearing a white dress. In her four arms, she holds a veena, a book, a rosary, and a conch along with a lotus, respectively. All of these items represent her status as the goddess of music and learning. She is seated upon a hexagonal, walled golden throne. Two parakeets are perched atop finials situated upon the throne. On the steps of the throne, the name of the artist is inscribed in the Nastaliq script.

Two winged paris are shown flanking the throne, as they hover above and behind it, shading the goddess with a gold brocade. The paris wear short-sleeved jackets over robes, as well as a Deccan-styled katzeb. Above the brocade is a panel, which contains a Dakhni verse, which can be translated to "Ibrahim, whose father is guru Ganapati, and mother the pure Saraswati”". This is an excerpt from song 56 of the Kitab.

Two Chinese-styled vases, each containing a bunch of flowers, are situated on either side of the throne. These vases have foxes painted upon them. A peacock, which is Saraswati's vahana, is seen in front of the throne. Beside the throne is an attendant, holding a bejewelled vessel.

== Critical analysis ==
Navina Najat Haidar describes the painting as "the apex of Bijapur painting" and "a pinnacle of Indian art as a whole".

The painting has various Indian and Persian influences. It is Farrukh Husayn's only known feminine depiction, and the subject being a Hindu goddess, would have been wholly foreign to him. As such, the goddess has been represented in the form of a Deccani princess, with the depiction closely following her description in the Kitab-i Nauras. Other Deccan elements include the sashes, pendants, and bracelets worn by the figures in the painting. Persian elements in the painting include the iwan arch in the background, as well as the flying paris flanking the throne, shading the goddess. The depiction of these creatures is an allusion to various Persian representations of the queen Bilqis, popular in Shiraz. This reference would have been apparent to the various Iranian noblemen at the Bijapur court.

The painting is a left folio, possibly from an album. Keelan Overton speculates that it was accompanied to the right by another painting, likely of a male figure. This figure might have been Ganesha or Ibrahim himself.
