= Rafi al-Din Shirazi =

Persian historian (c. 1540/41–1620)

Rafi al-Din Shirazi (c. 947 AH (1540/1541 CE) – 1620), also known as Rafi al-Din Ibrahim, was a Persian chronicler, diplomat, and merchant who served under sultans Ali I and Ibrahim II of the Sultanate of Bijapur. Born in Shiraz in Persia in around 947 AH (1540/1541 CE), his father was Nur al-Din Shirazi. He immigrated to the Sultanate of Bijapur in India for purposes of trading by request of Afzal Khan, a Bijapuri statesman and his relative. He eventually became employed in the court of the sultanate, and began holding various administrative positions in the 1560s. Early in his career he held roles such as a scribe, courtly kitchen official, and treasurer, while later serving as the ambassador to the neighbouring Ahmadnagar Sultanate from 1005 AH (1596/1597 CE) and governor of Bijapur Fort. Rafi al-Din visited the town of Sagara in 980 AH (1572/1573 CE), near the burial place of the sultanate's founder Yusuf Adil Shah, and toured the Ellora Caves around 1597.

From 1608 to 1611 or 1612, Rafi al-Din wrote his foremost historical work in tribute to sultan Ibrahim II, variously transliterated as Tazkirat al-Muluk or Tadhkirat al-Muluk (lit. 'History of Kings'). The chronicle provides an account of the sultanate's history and of other contemporary courts, and is, along with Firishta's Tārīkh-i Firishta, one of the preeminent sources for the history of the Bijapur Sultanate, although the latter is more widely known and used. Each of the ten segments of the Tazkirat al-Muluk focuses on a contemporary dynasty or monarch, with the anomaly of the devotion of one entirely to Afzal Khan, making evident Rafi al-Din's preference for the family member. The bulk of the sections pertain to the Bijapur Sultanate as well as the other Deccan sultanates, while the Bahmani Kingdom, Mughal Empire, and Safavid dynasty are also discussed.
