= Ibrahim Rauza =

Building in Karnataka, India

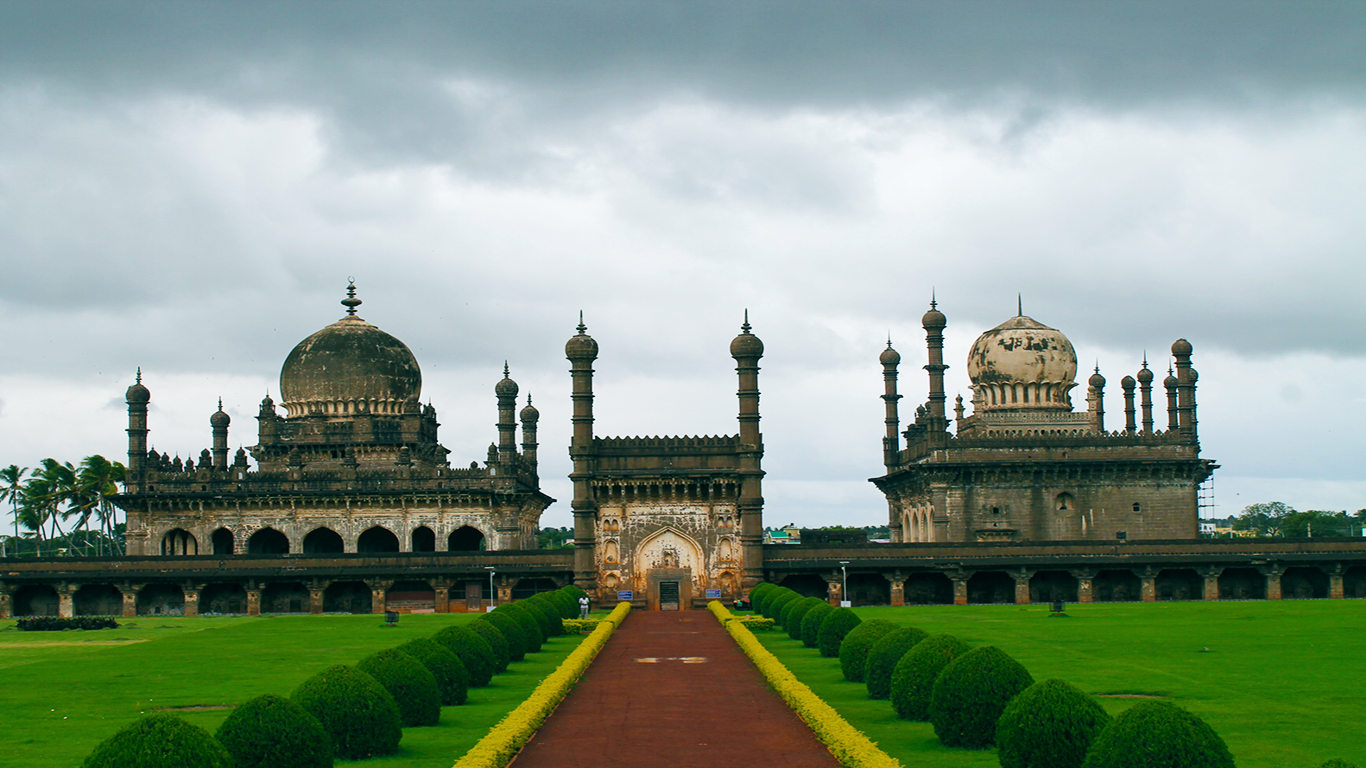

- Location of the tomb complex in Karnataka

Religion
- Affiliation: Islam
- Ecclesiastical or organisational status: Mosque and mausoleum
- Patron: Taj Sultana
- Status: Active

Location
- Location: Bijapur, Karnataka
- Country: India
- Administration: Archaeological Survey of India
- Coordinates: 16°49′37″N 75°42′7″E

Architecture
- Architect: Malik Sandal
- Type: Mosque architecture
- Style: Indo-Islamic
- Founder: Adil Shahi Dynasty
- Completed: 1036 AH (1626/1627 CE)

Specifications
- Domes: Two (one each for the mausoleum and mosque)
- Minarets: c. Ten (maybe more) (four each for the mausoleum and mosque)

Monument of National Importance
- Official name: Ibrahim Rauza
- Reference no.: N-KA-D150
- Location of the tomb complex in Bijapur

The Ibrahim Rauza, also known as the Ibrahim Rawza, (lit. 'Ibrahim's tomb') is a funerary complex featuring a mausoleum, a mosque and extensive gardens, located in Bijapur (now Vijayapura), in the state of Karnataka, India. The buildings are very similar in style, with a fountain between them. Following the example of many Indo-Islamic monuments, the buildings are raised on a plinth within an enclosed gated space. The complex was built in 1036 AH (1626/1627 CE) by Taj Sultana, the wife of Sultan Ibrahim Adil Shah II. The construction process reflects the magnificence of the building that took more than eight years to finish. It is by far one of the most remarkable artistic achievements of the Adil Shahi dynasty, who established a Sunni Sultanate in Bijapur in the 15th century and ruled for almost two hundred years.

Because of its magnificent skyline, the Ibrahim Rauza complex became commonly known as "The Black Taj Mahal" or "The Taj of the South". The complex is a Monument of National Importance, administered by the Archaeological Survey of India.

== Etymology ==
The word "Rauza" or "Rawza" comes originally from the Arabic word (روضة), which means a garden. Its use for funerary complexes started with the Mausoleum of the Prophet Muhammad in Medina, which the Prophet himself called a Rawda (Rawza). The term was then adopted in Iran for the mausolea of Sufi saints and became significantly popular during the Ilkhanid period. Afterwards, the term reached India under Persian influence and became used for most Islamic funerary structures, not limited to Sufi shrines.

== History ==
=== Patronage ===
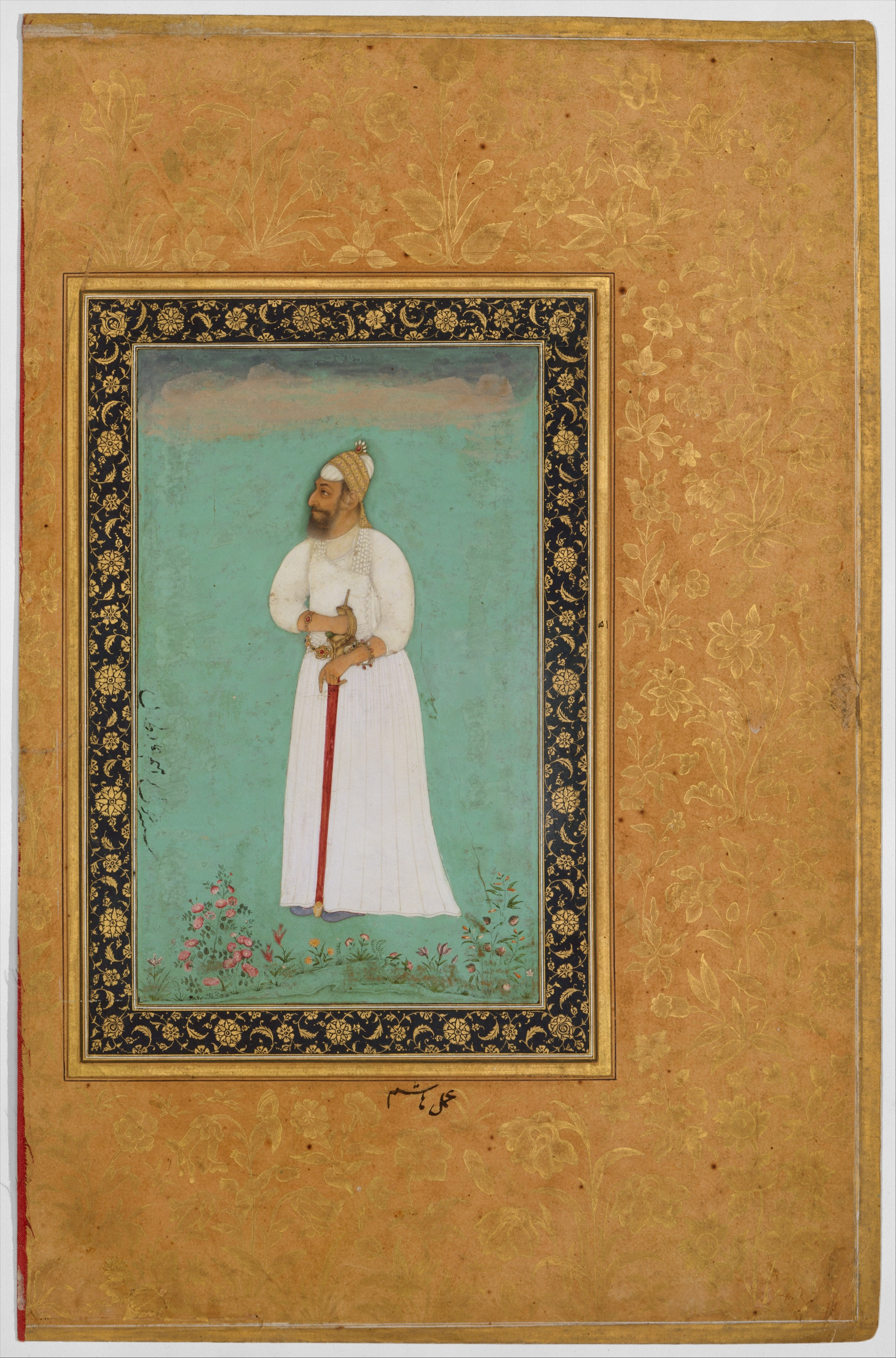
Portrait of Ibrahim 'Adil Shah II of Bijapur

Ibrahim Adil Shah II, the sultan this complex was named after, was one of the great patrons of art and architecture in Bijapur. During his reign, Bijapur reached its peak in terms of economic and artistic development. Since the sultan was buried in this outstanding complex, it was long thought that he was also its patron. However, the Persian inscriptions on the mausoleum's walls reveal that the complex was built by his wife Taj Sultana either originally for herself or for her husband. Yet, with the early death of Ibrahim Adil Shah II and his daughter Zehra Sultana and their entombment in her mausoleum, the complex was transformed into a family mausoleum, where another four family members were also buried later.

Taj Sultana was the second wife of Ibrahim Adil Shah II. However, she was probably aiming at establishing her position as the primary queen of Ibrahim Adil Shah II by embarking on building this masterpiece. Moreover, Taj Sultana's son, Muhammad, eventually reached the throne at the age of fourteen, after a fierce rivalry with his half-brother. Therefore, after the death of her husband, Taj Sultana, who held the foremost position of the Queen Mother, must have sealed her position in the court and become even more powerful.

Not only do the inscriptions mention Taj Sultana as the actual patron, but also the emphasis given to her across the inscriptional programme suggests that she might have built the mausoleum for herself. While Ibrahim Adil Shah II and Zehra Sultana were commemorated in a couple of lines, the inscriptions dedicated to Taj Sultana are distributed in three locations, each about six lines long. However, most of the Quranic verses mention the Prophet Ibrahim, the sultan's namesake, indicating the centrality of Ibrahim Adil Shah II in the complex.

=== Workers and craftsmen ===
The overseer of the complex's construction work was also mentioned in the inscriptions. His name was Malik Sandal, an Abyssinian eunuch who rose up the military ranks and became a prominent figure in Ibrahim Adil Shah's court. Malik Sandal was thought to be involved in designing the complex, although recent scholarship has positioned him as only the overseer of the project or the "sar-i kar". He was extremely loyal to Taj Sultana and he continued to manage the project even after her death. He is also thought to have contributed a sum of his own money towards the completion of the complex, according to an interpretation of two Persian lines in the mausoleum. The lines say "She spent one and a half lakh huns, but nine hundred more were added thereto," which Hutton interpreted as Sandal adding nine hundred huns of his own money.

Since the inscriptions took the lead role in ornamenting this complex, the calligrapher's signature was also inscribed on its walls. His name was Sayyid Naqi al-Din al-Husaini, and he signed his name several times either in square or triangular frames in various locations in the complex.

== Architecture ==
=== Location ===
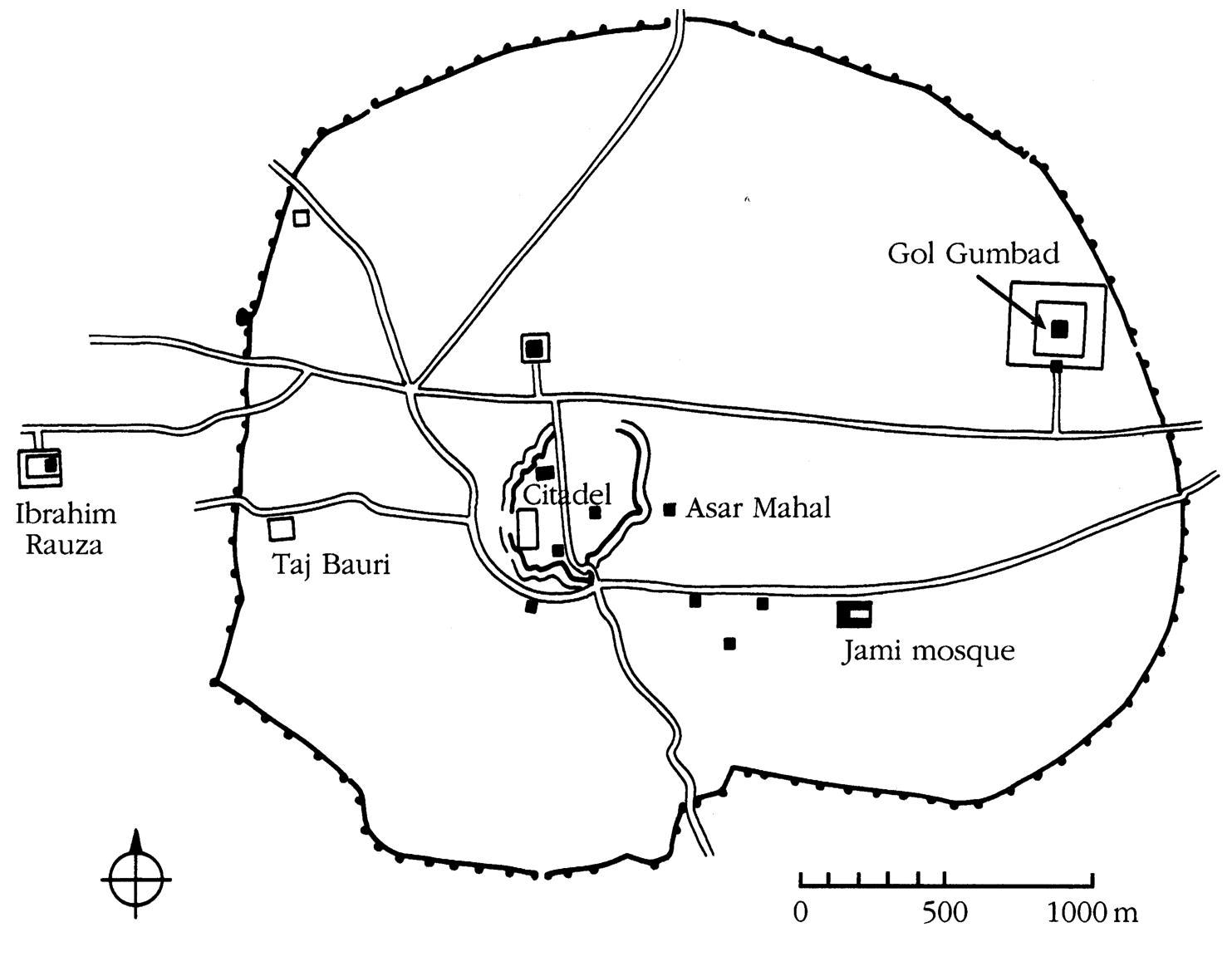
Location of Ibrahim Rauza in old Bijapur

The complex is located just outside the main Western gate of the old city of Bijapur, which is called the Mecca Darwaza. The location is significant because the gate, as its name indicates, used to lead to the main pilgrimage route. It was also located on the connecting road between Bijapur and Nauraspur, the new city built by Ibrahim Adil Shah II.

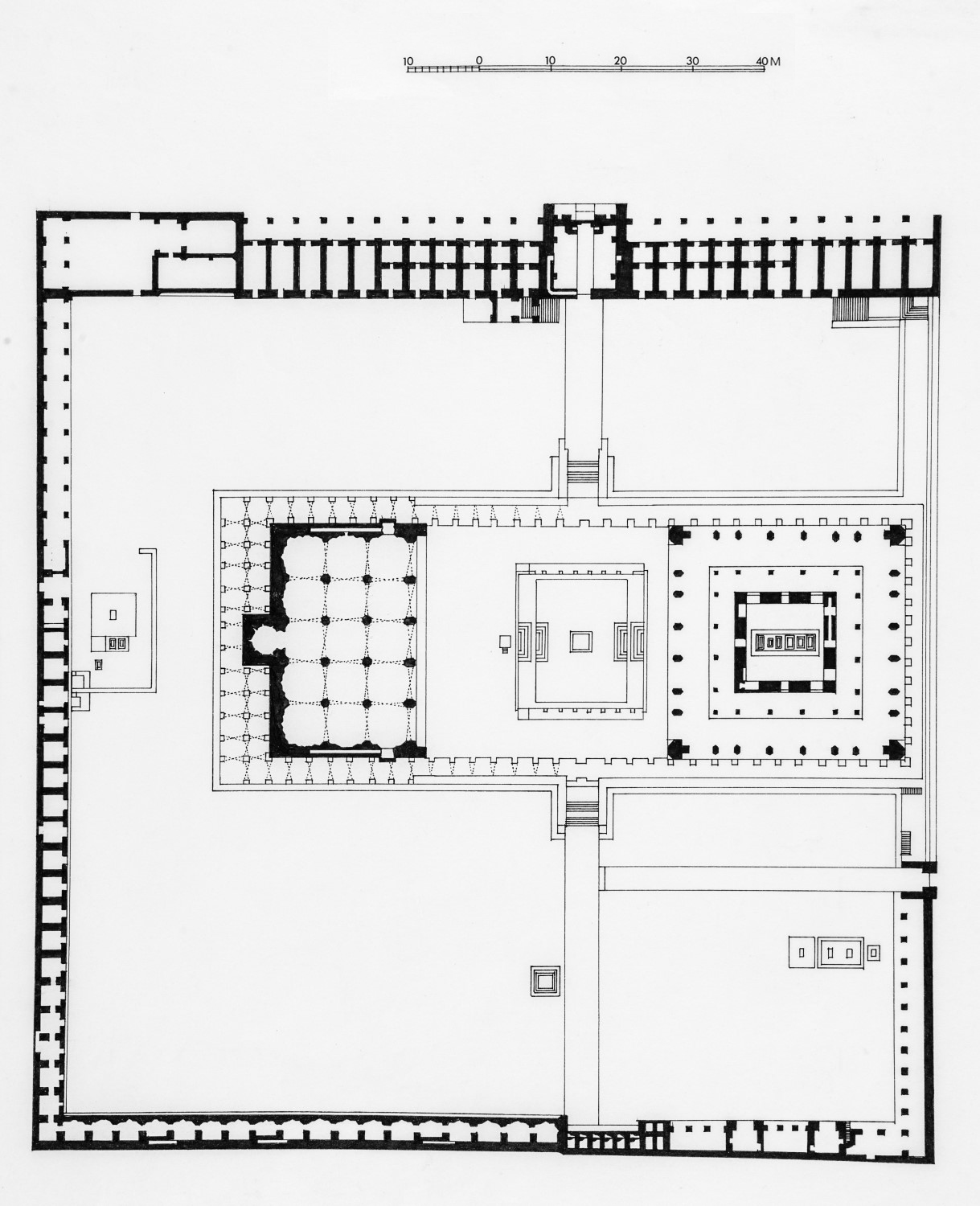
Ibrahim Rauza Plan

=== Plan ===
The overall space is contained by an almost square wall dotted with cells including residential rooms, a kitchen and a storeroom, surrounding the main features of the complex, which are the mausoleum and the mosque. Both are raised on a plinth and connected to the outer wall by a pathway leading from the outer gateway to a stair flight flanked by two domed pillars. Between them is a basin and a fountain in addition to a cistern underneath. The plinth is not at the centre but is positioned rather slightly towards the northeast.

The interior plans of the mosque and the mausoleum are significantly different from each other despite the similarity of their outer appearance. The mosque, which is located on the right side for the viewer entering the complex from the outer gate, is of a hypostyle plan with three rows of arcades in the prayer hall, each consisting of five bays. The mausoleum, on the other hand, consists of a rectangular structure, surrounded by two concentric rectangles of pillars forming a double veranda.

=== The mausoleum ===
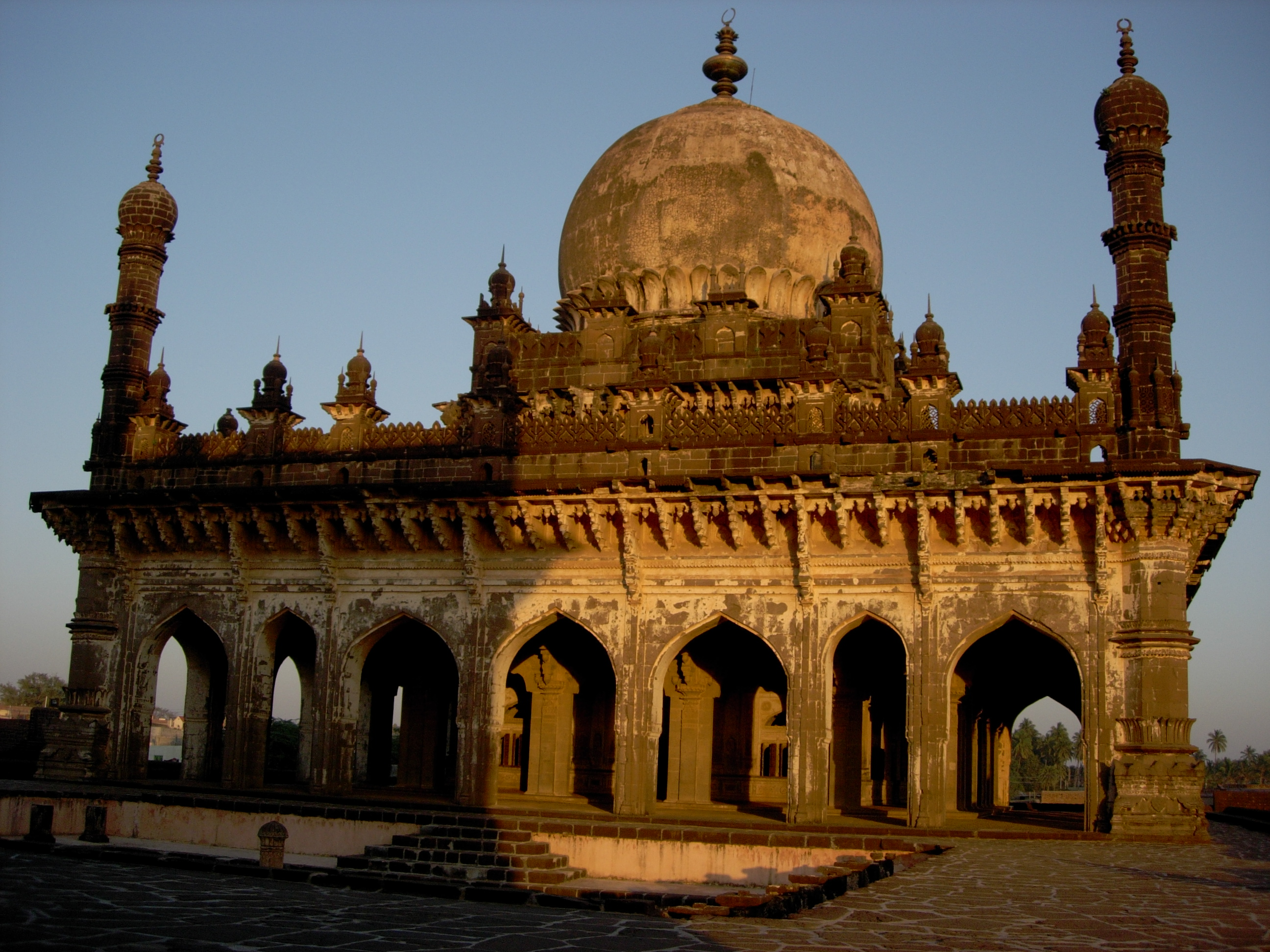
The mausoleum of the Ibrahim Rauza complex

Although the mosque and the mausoleum share similar design features, especially their overall profiles, the mausoleum is the focus of artistic craftsmanship in the complex. It is slightly bigger than the mosque and is adorned with exquisite stone carvings, including calligraphic perforated stone carved windows (Jali). The whole complex bears a significant amount of calligraphy not seen elsewhere in the Islamic monuments of the Indian subcontinent.

Both the mausoleum and the mosque have a bulbous dome, which has a distinctive base of lotus petals. However, the dome of the mausoleum is larger in diameter. The symbolism of the lotus extends beyond the Islamic sphere to the Buddhist tradition, where it signifies purity and transcendence. The design became popular during the Adil Shahi period as it became associated with their concept of the ideal ruler, inspired by Buddhist sources.

The mausoleum has four corner domed towers with six small turrets on each side above the unidentical arches beneath them. The three central arches are almost identical in size, flanked by other significantly smaller ones, while the outermost arches are almost identical to the central three. This arrangement is a quite distinctive feature in the mausoleum.

The upper parts of the mausoleum and the mosque are the focal point of microarchitectural elements such as the small turrets, bearing small domes identical to the main dome, the slender minarets, and the lotus-bud finials. These elements borrow from the overall structure, in a treatment called self-imaging, which was inspired by Hindu architecture. The crenelations on the rooftop and the stone brackets supporting the hanging eaves show a mixture of classical Islamic stylized vegetal ornamentation along with Indian elements such as the hanging bosses. All of these elements were finely carved in stone, showing exquisite craftsmanship.

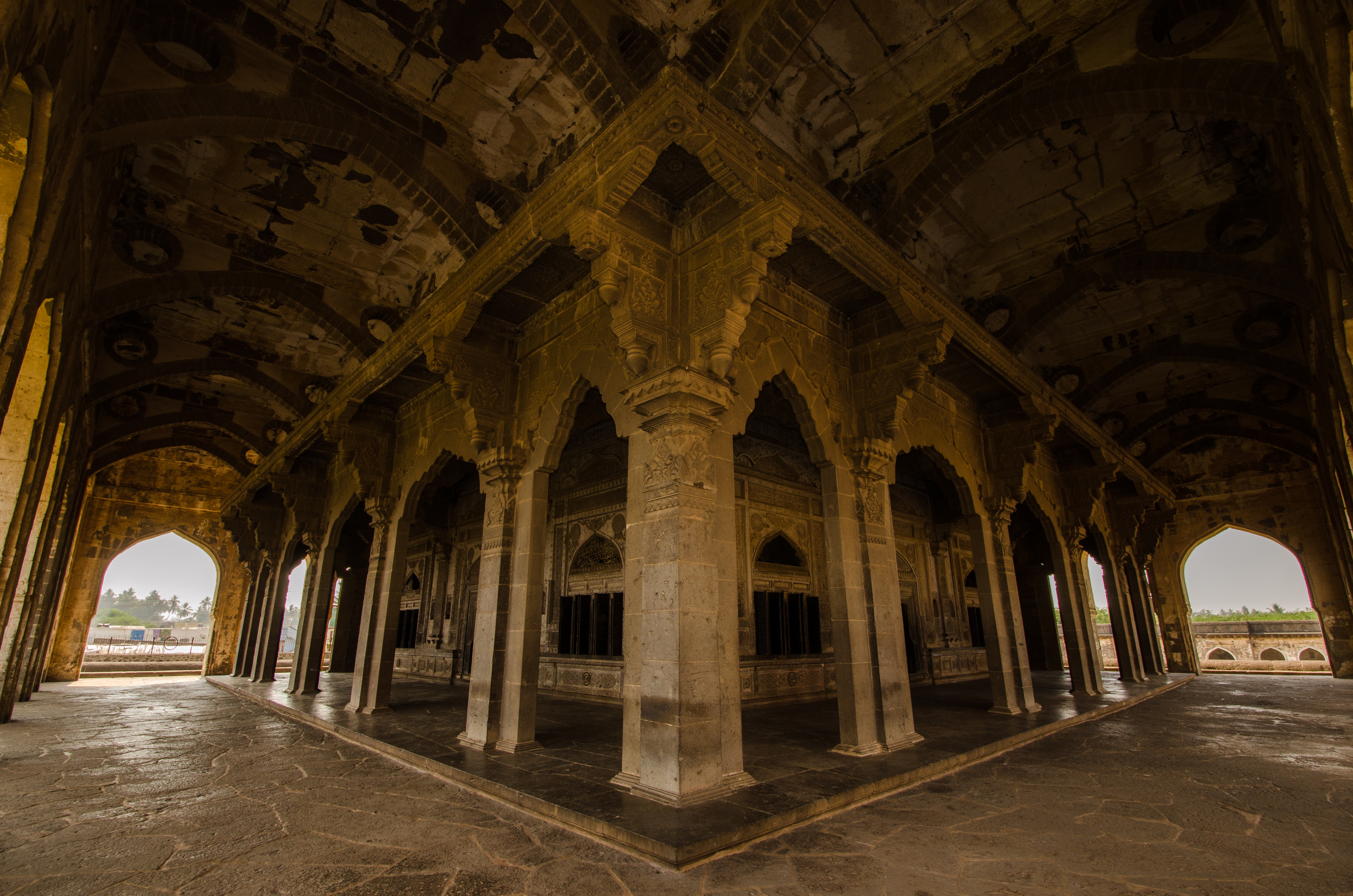
View from the first veranda- the mausoleum of the Ibrahim Rauza complex

Under the hanging eaves, the arcades lead to a double veranda, where the inner one is topped by a flat roof. The ceiling of the outer veranda is plain while the inner veranda's ceiling is highly decorated with stone carvings showing the typical Indian motifs of floral medallions within a square. The ceiling panels also feature the swastika element, which is a repeated motif in the mausoleum. The pillars leading to the inner veranda are rectangular, their shafts are highly decorated with floral carvings and their capitals show a curvilinear design.

The four sides of the burial chamber bear four engaged columns on each side, reflecting the same decoration programme of the pillars. The chamber appears to be rising on its own plinth, giving the engaged column a shorter almost square-like appearance. The plinth itself is also decorated with rectangular carved stone panels, where some of them bear lotuses. The chamber has four entrances with wooden doors, each surrounded by three densely carved calligraphic bands. Each of these doors is also flanked by two windows, which are in turn bordered by three calligraphic bands. The window tympanums show magnificent calligraphic carved stone screens, which are reminiscent of the iconic Indian Jali, making them a distinct innovation. The doors are made of teakwood.

Inside the burial chamber lie six stone cenotaphs of Ibrahim Adil Shah II and his family members including his wife Taj Sultana; the patron of the complex. The interior stands in striking contrast to the heavily ornamented façade since it is almost devoid of any ornamentation. However, its monumental size of forty-two feet square and thirty-three feet high and utter simplicity make the cenotaphs stand out with their curved imposing design. Although the cenotaphs vary in size, their design is fairly similar.

=== The mosque ===
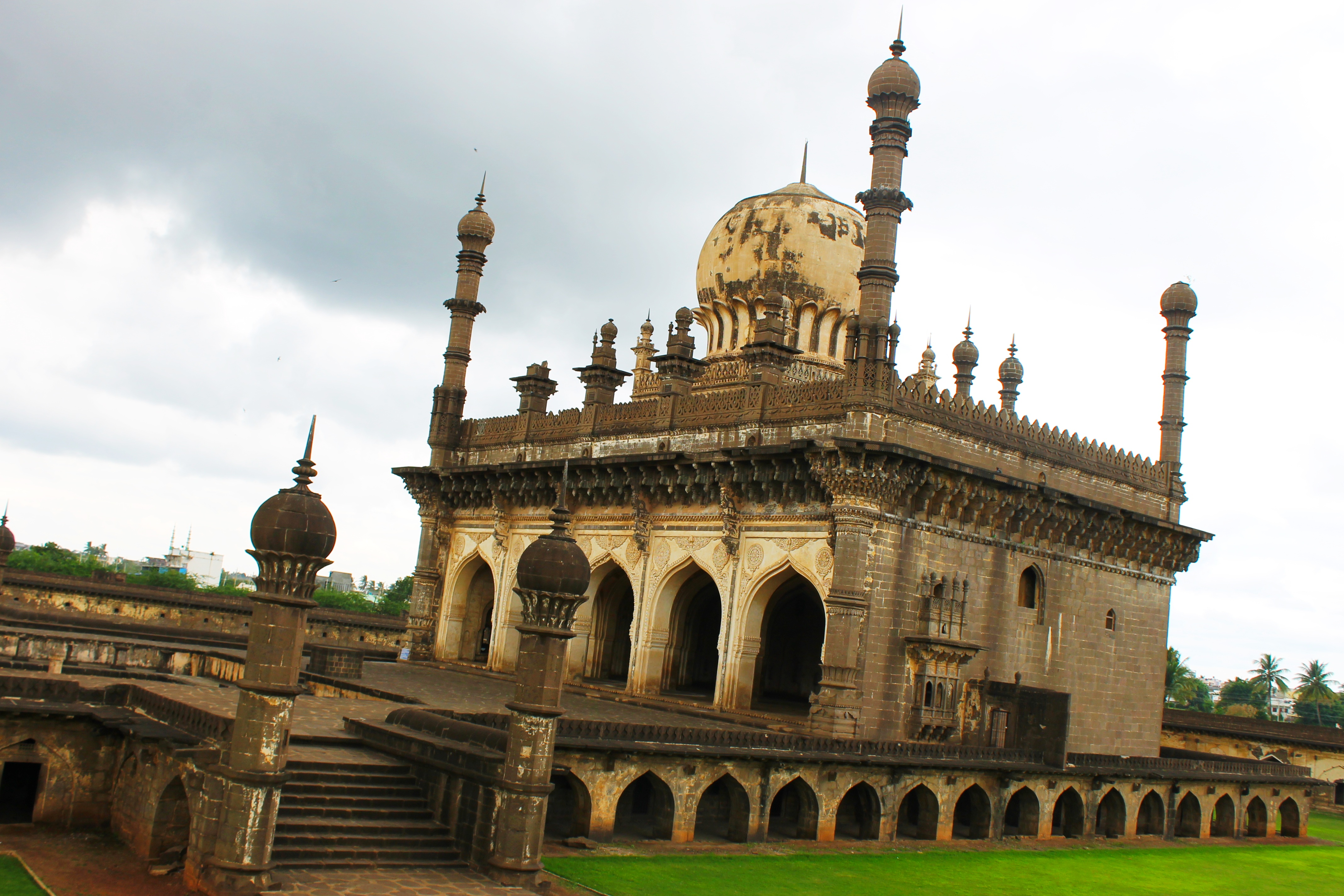
Ibrahim Rauza mosque

The outer appearance of the mosque shares many features with the mausoleum including the dome, the four slender minarets, the turrets and the ornate crenelations. It is more of a traditional style of a series of arches, leading to pendentives bearing squinch-net-like design, reminiscent of the influential Timurid tradition. The mosque still has some distinctive features such as a stone-carved lotus medallion connected to a stone-carved chain hanging from the ceiling. The minarets could also have had hanging carved chains similar to the ones still preserved in the Kali Masjid, Jalna, although they are now lost. Unlike the tomb, which is mostly made of stone, the mosque's main decorative material is mostly plaster and stucco, especially in the interior.

The qibla wall has several mihrabs, a classic feature of many Indo-Islamic mosques. The main mihrab, however, is distinctive by a small, angled cave-like chamber bearing two rows of miniature mihrab designs on each of its ten sides. The mihrab has an elegant frame of carved stucco.

=== The water works ===
The old city of Bijapur depended primarily on receiving water from two huge water tanks built outside the city. The Ibrahim Rauza complex received water from the Western tank coming from a nearby village called Torvi.

The Ibrahim Rauza complex bears a series of water structures including a cistern, a trough, feeder channels and, most prominently, a fountain between the mosque and the mausoleum. the remains of at least thirteen water features still exist in the complex despite being out of use.

== See also ==
- Islam in India
- List of mosques in India
