= Nauraspur =

Destroyed city in Karnataka, India

Nauraspur was a city in what is today Karnataka, India. It was founded in July 1599 by Ibrahim Adil Shah II, the sultan of the Bijapur Sultanate. It was destroyed in 1624 by Burhan Nizam Shah III, then sultan of the Ahmednagar Sultanate, which were the Adil Shahis' greatest rival and also a member of the Deccan Sultanates.

It was located 3 kilometres (1.9 mi) west of Bijapur, the capital of the Sultanate, and was intended to be a hub of learning and culture, but was never fully completed when it was destroyed in 1624.
