= Sundar Mahal =

Consort of Ibrahim Adil Shah II

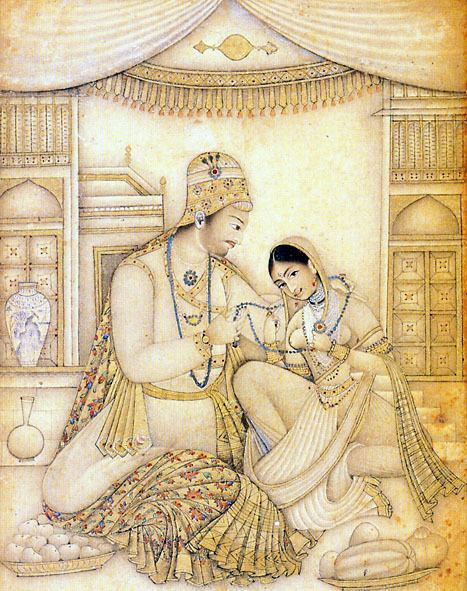
- Ibrahim Adil Shah with a consort, possibly Sundar Mahal. ca.1610-1627
- Born: Bijapur, Sultanate of Bijapur
- Died: 17th century, Sultanate of Bijapur
- Spouse: Ibrahim Adil Shah II
- Issue: Khizr Shah
- House: Adil Shahi (by marriage)
- Father: Dasu Pandit

Sundar Mahal was a consort of Ibrahim Adil Shah II, the sixth Sultan of the Sultanate of Bijapur.

== Life ==
Sundar Mahal was the daughter of Dasu Pandit, a nobleman of Bijapur who gained prominence in the Adil Shahi court as a Majumdar (treasurer) . Her marriage to the Bijapur royal house resulted in the advancement of her family. Dasu Pandit gave his daughter's hand in marriage to Ibrahim Adil Shah II and she became his consort. After Sundar Mahal's marriage, her father Dasu Pandit was later allowed to hold the prestigious offices of Muhammat-i-Mil and Sar Khayli.

She gave birth to a son named Khizr Shah in the year 1627, which was the same year that Ibrahim Adil Shah II died. Sundar Mahal was left with her infant prince, and Kamal Khatun was also left with her son. On the same year, Mohammed Adil Shah became the new sultan of the Adil Shahi dynasty upon the death of his father.
