= Muhammad Zuhuri =

Persian poet (1537–1616)

Nūr al-Dīn Muḥammad Ẓuhūrī
- Born: 1537
- Died: 1616 (aged 78–79)
- Writing career
- Language: Persian
- Genre: Poetry

Nūr al-Dīn Muḥammad Ẓuhūrī (d. AH 1025/CE 1616) was a Persian poet born around 1537. Ẓuhūrī states that he was born in Qāʾin, but tradition identifies his birthplace as a village in the district of Turshiz, thus his often used nisbat Turshīzī. He began his career in Yazd at the court of Ghiyās al-Dīn Mīr-i Mīrān, where he was acquainted with the poet Waḥshī. After spending several years in Shiraz he travelled to the Deccan in 1580 where he entered the service of Ibrahim Adil Shah II. There he married the daughter of Mawlānā Malik Qumī. Among his known works is the Sāqīʻnāma. An anthology of his poems is titled Kulliyyāt-i Ẓuhūrī, the oldest copy of which appears to be that in the India Office collection at the British Library. The seals in this manuscript show that it was in the library of Shah Jahan. He died in 1616, the same year as his colleague Qumī.
