= Farrukh Beg =

Persian miniature painter (born c. 1547)

- فرخ بیگ
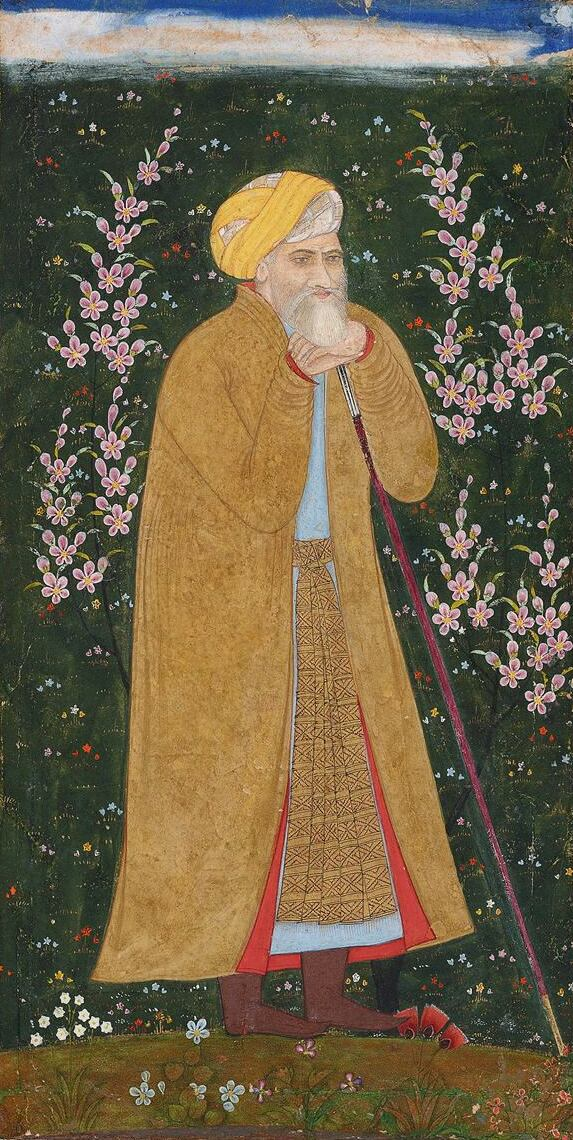
- Portrait of an old man, a presumed self-portrait (detail). Metropolitan Museum of Art, New York.
- Born: c. 1547; Safavid Iran
- Died: After 1615; Mughal Empire
- Education: Khorasan
- Notable work: See
- Style: Persian; Mughal

Farrukh Beg (Persian: فرخ بیگ; c. 1547 – after 1615), also known as Farrukh Husayn, was a Persian painter, who spent a bulk of his career in Safavid Iran and Mughal India, praised by Mughal Emperor Jahangir as "unrivaled in the age."

Farrukh Beg was credited with painting a plethora of Persian and Mughal paintings, a handful of which survive today. His work showed his distinct training in Persian manuscript painting, which later on evolved to include more experimental techniques such as atmospheric perspective and modeling.

Farrukh had produced miniature paintings under the patronage of five known rulers in West Asia and South Asia: Ibrahim Mirza of Safavid Mashhad, Mirza Muhammad Hakim of Kabul, Akbar in Mughal India and later his son Jahangir, and Ibrahim Adil Shah II of the Sultanate of Bijapur. His distinct style came to be revered by his contemporaries and patrons, due to a distinct homogeneity, evolving as a result of his Persian training and experiences in cosmopolitan Mughal courts.

His life was later mired in mystery due to his sudden hiatus from the Mughal court sometime after 1595, rejoining the Mughal atelier around 1609. Evidence has shown he spent a bulk of this time in Bijapur under the patronage of Ibrahim Adil Shah II of the Sultanate of Bijapur.

== Life in Safavid Iran and Kabul ==
Farrukh Beg was born in modern-day Iran, around 1547. He belonged to the Kalmaq (Kalmyk) tribe, according to Akbar's vizier Abu'l Fazl, while some sources contest that he originated from the Qashqa’i tribe. He received his training in Khurasan (located in modern-day northwest Iran). The earliest mention of Farrukh appears in a historical record by Iskander Beg Munshi, a court historian under Shah Abbas I, about the close companionship between Farrukh Beg and his brother Siyavush and Hamza Mirza, son of the reigning Safavid ruler, Shah Muhammad Khodabanda. While working at the atelier of Ibrahim Mirza, the governor of Mashhad, Farrukh Beg illustrated a manuscript of Haft Awrang (Seven Thrones). Farrukh illustrated all but one painting in the manuscript, allowing him to form a homogenous iconographic style as reflected in the artwork. Farrukh Beg's early tutelage is indirectly attributed to Mirza Ali and Shaykh Muhammad, two prolific painters who belonged to the atelier of Ibrahim Mirza in Mashhad. However, no direct link has been established between the latter painters and Farrukh.

While the exact date of Farrukh's departure for Kabul is not recorded, his tenure under Mirza Muhammad Hakim, half-brother of Mughal Emperor Akbar, has been well documented. While the extent of Farrukh's work for Muhammad Hakim is difficult to gauge due to a lack of illustrations available, two tinted illustrations made under Hakim bear Farrukh's signature, housed in the Gulistan Palace Library in Tehran, Iran. In 1585 at the age of 40, after the death of Mirza Muhammad Hakim, he took his skills to the court of Mughal Emperor Akbar in Mughal India, either in Rawalpindi or Lahore, where he received his title Beg.

== Work at the Mughal court under Akbar ==
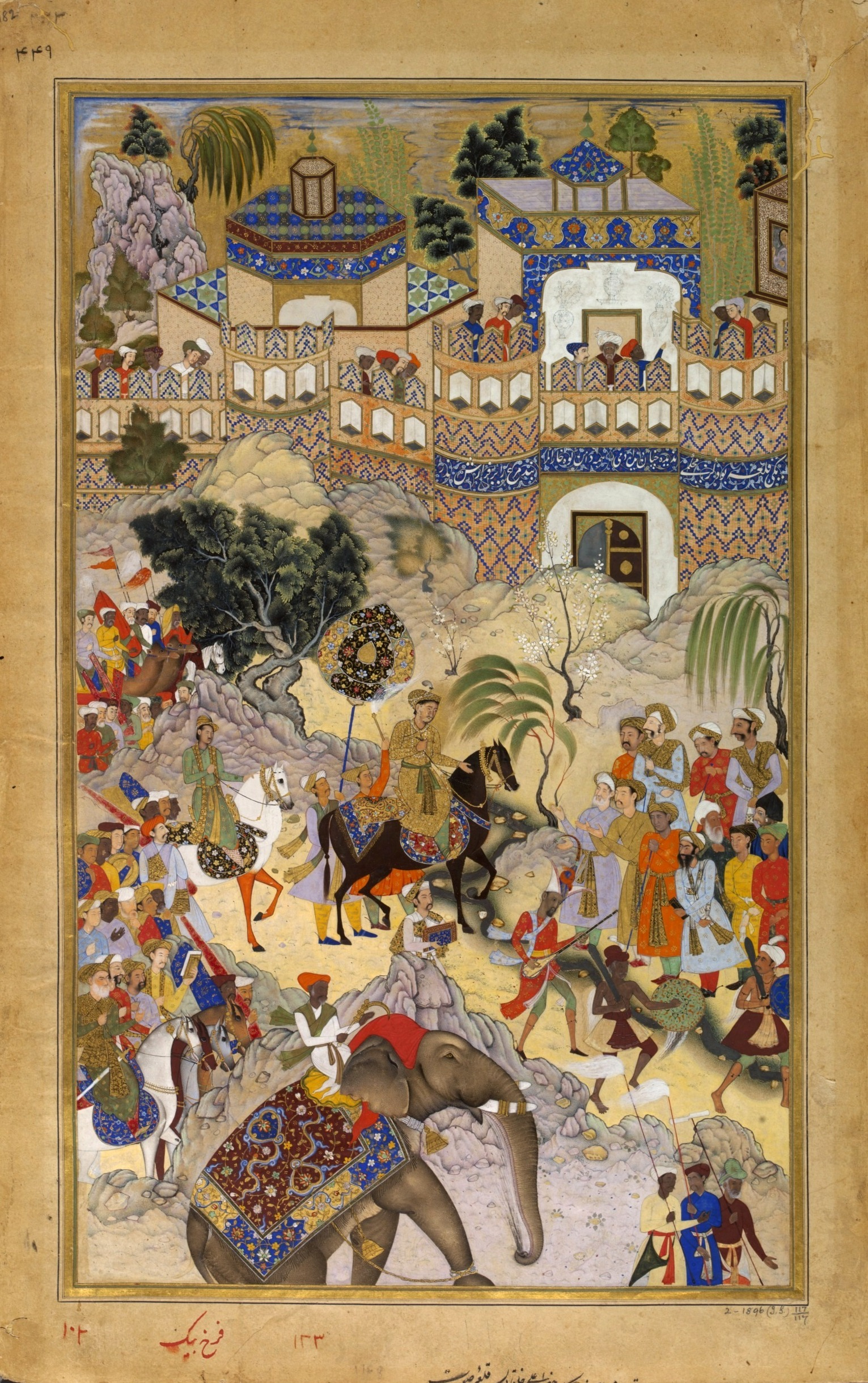
Akbar's Triumphal Entry into Surat, Akbarnama, 1590–95, Victoria and Albert Museum, London

Farrukh Beg's arrival at Mughal court is documented by Abu'l Fazl in the administrative record, Ain-i-Akbari. Abu'l Fazl states "Farrukh Beg Musavvir and others received suitable robes and horses, and trays of muhrs and rupis. Various favors were conferred upon them." Farrukh's first illustration in Akbar's atelier was the Khamsa of Nizami, a Persian manuscript in which Farrukh embellished seven out of thirty-six illustrations. The composition and stylistic techniques of the Khamsa illustrations draw heavily from his previous work, Haft Awrang, under Safavid patronage.

He worked on the Baburnama and the Akbarnama, both commissioned by Akbar as historical documentation of Babur and Akbar's reign. In the Akbarnama, some of Farrukh Beg's works include Akbar's Triumphal Entry into Surat and Mir Mu’izz al-Mulk and Afghan rebel Bahadur Khan meet in 1567. Farrukh's work in the Baburnama includes the illustration titled Babur Entertains in Sultan Imrahim Lodi’s Palace.

Working in the Mughal atelier, Farrukh was often singled out as one of the most exceptional manuscript painters of his time, along with the other renowned Mughal painters like Daswant and La’l. Farrukh Beg's celebrated status at Akbar's court is seen through frequent mentions as "nadir al-asr" (Wonder of the age) in Baburnama and Akbarnama, conferred as part of the reward system instituted by Mughal rulers to exalt artists' workmanship.

== Hiatus from Mughal court and later return ==
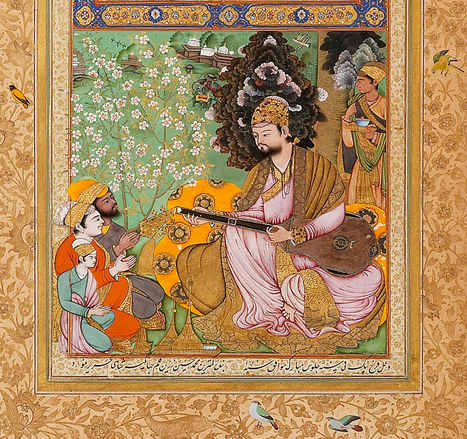
Ibrahim Adil Shah plays the Lute

In around 1590, Farrukh Beg took a brief leave from the Mughal court of Akbar. In 1957, scholar Robert Skelton proposed that Farrukh spent his sojourn in the Sultanate of Bijapur under the patronage of Ibrahim Adil Shah II, a theory contested by scholars until evidence unearthed by John Seyller and Ellen Smart confirmed the hypothesis. A signature by Farrukh was ascertained on a Deccan illustration of Ibrahim Adil II Hawking (1598), inscribed "it is the work of Farrukh Beg" (aml-i Farrukh Beg ast). The signature helped identify more paintings completed by the hand of Farrukh in Bijapur, based on starkly similar stylistic choices and compositional renderings. Many illustrations at the Deccan court bear the name "Farrukh Husayn", and Skelton had posited, to later scholarly acceptance, that this signature was from the same Farrukh. Other paintings by Farrukh during this period include Ibrahim Adil Shah plays the Lute (1600), Ibrahim Rides the Elephant Atish Khan, Bull Elephant (1600–1604) and Horse and Groom (1604).

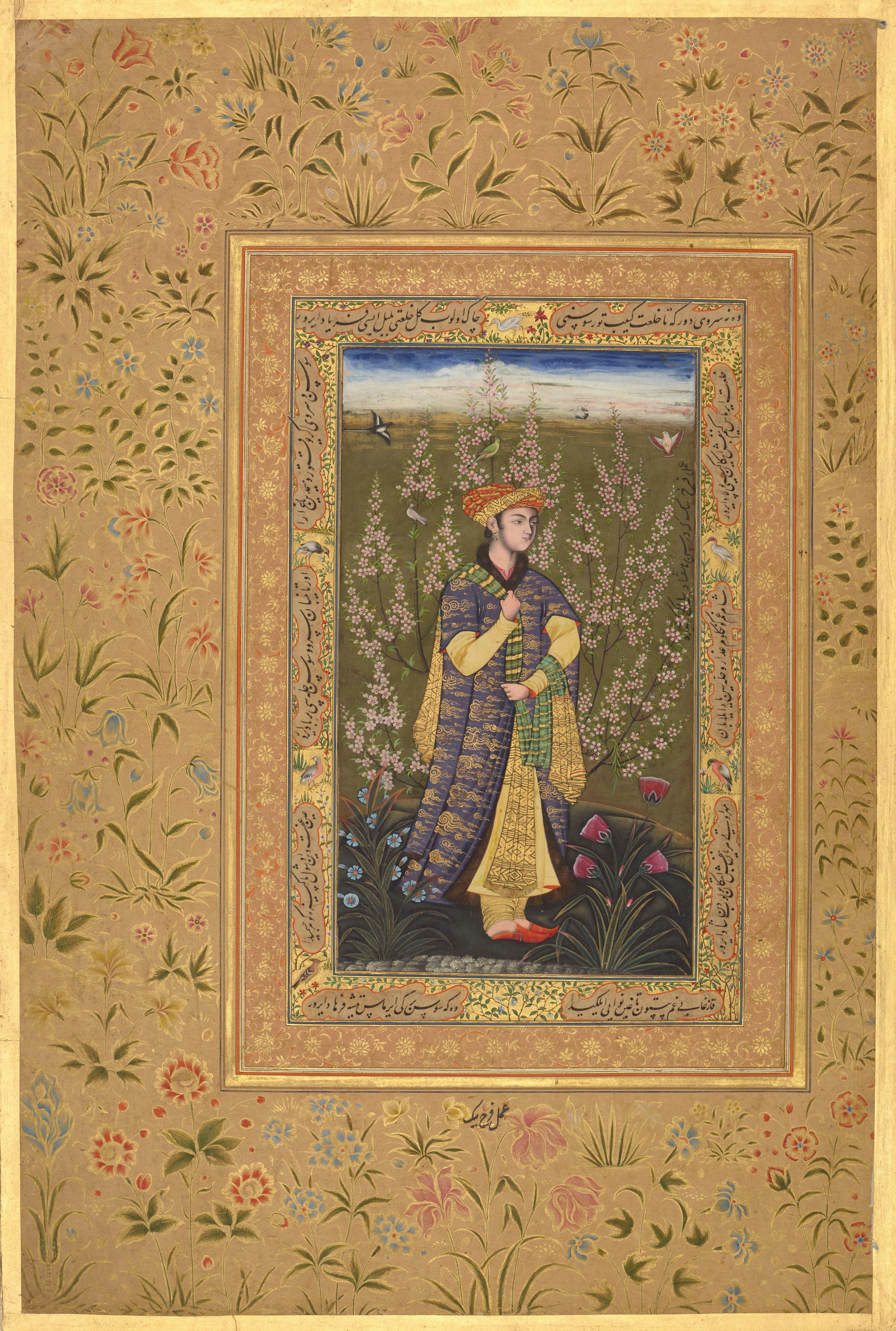
Elegant Page Boy. Chester Beatty Library

Around 1609, Farrukh returned to the Mughal Court, now under the rule of Emperor Jahangir. His return is dated by a mention in Jahangir's memoirs, which report Jahangir bestowing 2,000 rupees on the "unrivaled" Farrukh Beg. Under the auspices of Jahangir, Farrukh worked on the Gulshan Muraqqa, an album of illustrations assembled by Jahangir, as well as the Minto Album. He also painted several folios, now separated from their original work and dispersed among collections around the world. The latest mention of Farrukh occurs in Iqbalnama-i Jahangiri, penned by Mutamad Khan, celebrating Farrukh's artistic ingenuity and creativity by referring to him as "who has no rival or equal in the space of the universe."

== Style and technique ==
Throughout his career, Farrukh Beg leveraged his interaction with various geographical locations across West Asia and cosmopolitan courts in South Asia, artistic styles and patrons to hone his own artistic technique. Farrukh's early style is marked by similarity to Persian painting lexicon developed under Safavid rule, particularly by Mirza Ali and Shaykh Muhammad, which he practiced under Safavid patronage before arriving to Mughal India. Individualized figural portraits, geometric patterns in landscape and clothing, and planar treatment of architecture were widespread in his illustrations. His first documented illustrations in the Haft Awrang juxtapose bright colors to enhance the didactic and literary work with unique figural traits shown using elongated facial features and chin positions.

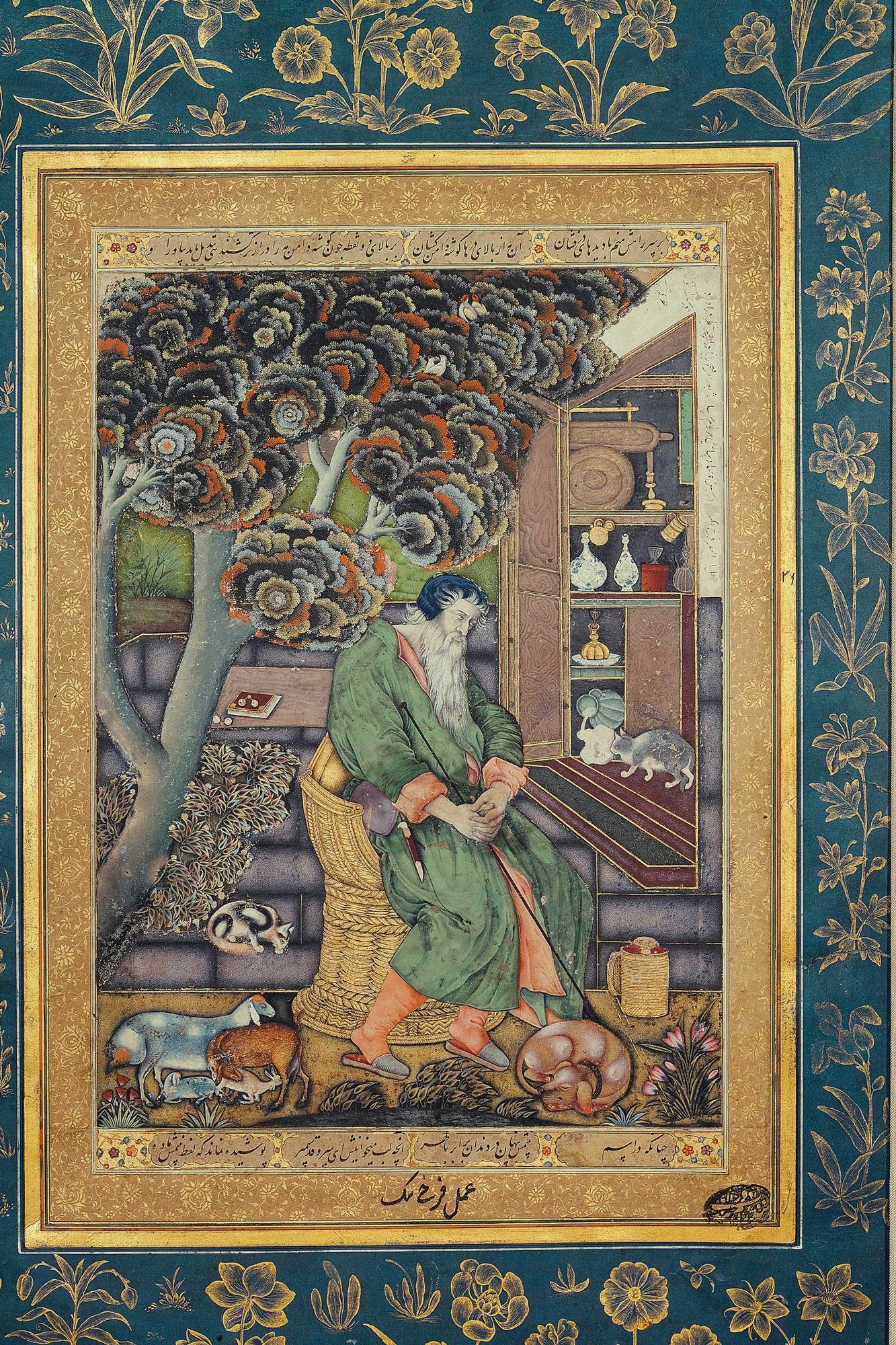
Saint Jerome as the Representation of Melancholy, 1615 (borders attributed to Ustad Mansur). This miniature is based on a print by Maerten de Vos of Dolor ('Melancholy'), itself based on a depiction of Jerome by Dürer. Museum of Islamic Art, Doha

In his illustrations at Mughal court, Farrukh imported his artistic techniques, informed by his work in Safavid Iran. As illustrated in Akbar's Triumphal Entry into Surat, Farrukh continued the use of color to simultaneously separate and harmonize the composition, while displaying patterned and minutely detailed architectural background, geometric forms contrasted with serpentine chenar trees, illuminated gold skies and intricate vegetal surroundings with bent and textured foliage. His revered position at the Mughal court enabled him to imbue his own creative genius into his work, due to a special dispensation allowing him to work alone on all illustrations between 1586 and 1596. He fully utilized these techniques in Mughal miniature paintings but later went on to incorporate atmospheric perspective, figural modeling and folding drapery in his paintings, primarily seen after his Bijapur period, as illustrated in the painting of the Old Sufi.

A recurrent theme in Farrukh's work is found in his renderings of youths and Sufis. Farrukh painted many depictions of adorable youths and princes and aged and esteemed Sufi figures, particularly after his return to the Mughal court under Jahangir. He conducted extensive study to paint these figures, portraying them in solitude and immersed in natural surroundings, emphasizing their spirituality. The opulently dressed youths and simply dressed Sufis stand in impassive poses, holding an inanimate object or flowers and birds as witness of religious elation and spiritual connection.

== See also ==
- Mughal painting
