= Kitab-i Nauras =

16th-century work by sultan Ibrahim Adil Shah II

- Author: Ibrahim Adil Shah II
- Language: Deccani with an introduction in Persian
- Genre: Poetry
- Publication place: Bijapur Sultanate (modern-day India)

Kitab-i Nauras (transl. The Book of Nine Rasas), also transliterated as Kitab-e-Nauras, is a 16th-century treatise written by Sultan Ibrahim Adil Shah II of Bijapur. It was written with the title Nauras, meaining Nine Rasas, but was named as Nauras Nama or Kitab-i Nauras later. It is a collection of 59 Manqabat Kalaam (song) and 17 couplets in the Deccani language.

== Contents ==
=== Introduction ===
The introduction to the book was not written by Ibrahim; instead, it was written by the poet Muhammad Zuhuri in Persian rather than Deccani. Zuhuri states that the preface is "a worthless stone for the garland made of royal pearls".

=== Songs ===
In the ten known manuscripts, there are fifty-nine songs, although no single copy contains all of them. In addition, there are seventeen dohas.

A significant portion of the songs are praises sung for Saraswati, Ganesha, and other Hindu deities. Others praise the prophet Muhammad and Sufi saint Bande Nawaz. Another portion refers to Ibrahim's private life. His favorite elephant Atish Khan and favorite tambourine Moti Khan are also praised. In others, Ibrahim's mother Bari Sahib and wife Chand Sultan are referred to.

=== Rasas ===
1. Shringara means the sentiment of love and romance.
2. Veera means the sentiment of heroism or chivalry
3. Veebhatsa means the sentiment of disgust
4. Raudra means the sentiment of anger and fury
5. Bhayanak means the sentiment of dread and terror
6. Hasya means the sentiment of joy and humour
7. Karuna means the sentiment of compassion and pathos
8. Adbhuta means the sentiment of wonder and amazement
9. Shanta means the sentiment of peace and contenment
