= Malek Qommi =

Malek Qommi (Persian: ملک قمی; died 1616) was an Iranian-born poet in the Ahmadnagar Sultanate and Sultanate of Bijapur.

== Sources ==
- Fischel, Roy S. (2020). Local States in an Imperial World: Identity, Society and Politics in the Early Modern Deccan. Edinburgh University Press. ISBN 978-1474436083.
- Fischel, Roy S. (2021). "Shi'i Rulers, Safavid Alliance and the Religio-Political Landscape of the Deccan". In Melville, Charles (ed.). Safavid Persia in the Age of Empires, the Idea of Iran Vol. 10. Bloomsbury Publishing. pp. 331–356. ISBN 978-0755633777.
- Losensky, Paul (2021). "Not all of the poets went to India: literary culture in Iran under Safavid rule". In Matthee, Rudi (ed.). The Safavid World. Routledge. pp. 447–468.
- Overton, Keelan (2020). "Introduction to Iranian Mobilities and Persianate Mediations in the Deccan". In Overton, Keelan (ed.). Iran and the Deccan: Persianate Art, Culture, and Talent in Circulation, 1400–1700. Indiana University Press. pp. 3–76. ISBN 978-0253048912.
- Shafieioun, Saeid (2019). "Some Critical Remarks on the Migration of Iranian Poets to India in the Safavid Era". Journal of Persianate Studies. 11 (2). Brill: 155–174. doi:10.1163/18747167-12341327.
