= Ibrahim Adil Shah II =

Sultan of Bijapur from 1580 to 1627

Ibrahim Adil Shah
- Sultan
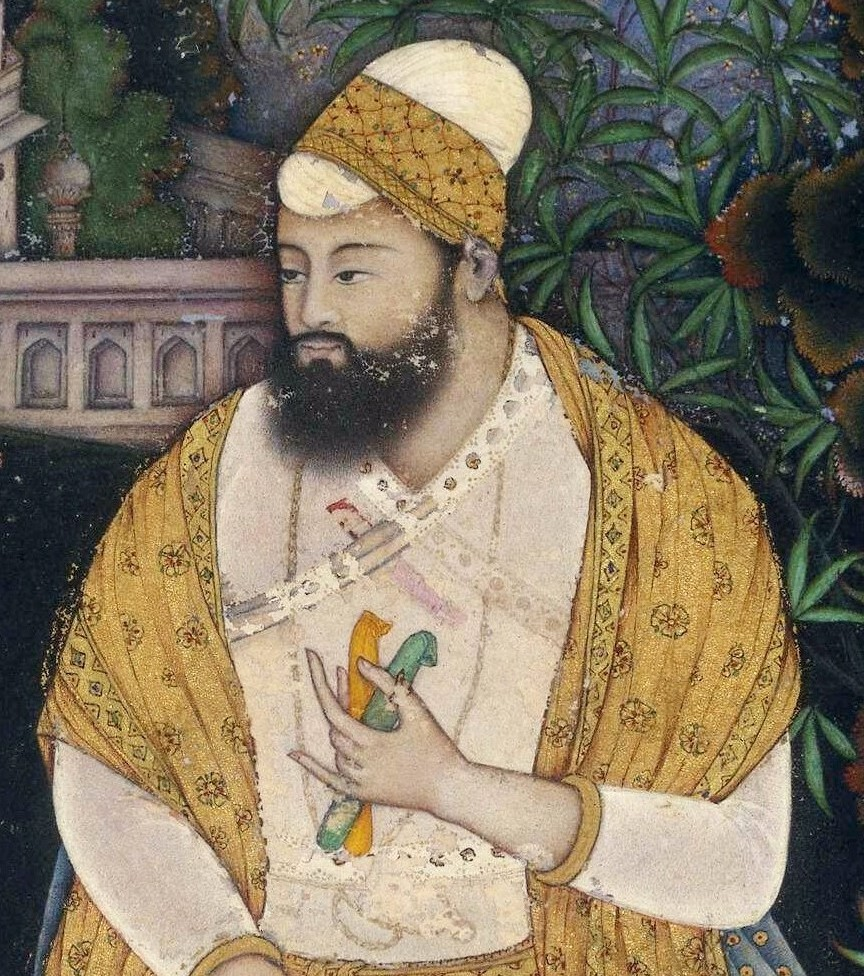
- A portrait of Ibrahim Adil Shah II

6th Sultan of Bijapur
- Reign: 10 April 1580 – 12 September 1627
- Predecessor: Ali Adil Shah I
- Successor: Mohammed Adil Shah
- Born: c. 1570
- Died: 12 September 1627 (aged 56–57); Bijapur
- Burial: Ibrahim Rauza
- Spouse: Taj Sultana (daughter of Ibrahim Qutb Shah) Sundar Mahal
- Issue: Danish Adil Shah; Sultan Sulaiman; Muhammad Adil Shah; Omar Shah; Hafsa Sultana; Burhan; Sultan Begum (wife of Daniyal Mirza; Ayesha Sultana
Names
- Abdul Muzaffar Ibrahim Adil Shah Jagadguru Badshah
- Dynasty: Adil Shahi dynasty
- Religion: Sunni Islam

Ibrahim Adil Shah II (1570 – 12 September 1627) was the Adil Shahi sultan of the Sultanate of Bijapur from 1580 to 1627. Under his reign the sultanate had its greatest period as he extended its frontier as far south as Mysore. He was a skilful administrator, artist, poet and a generous patron of the arts. He was an Arab Sunni Islam, but remained tolerant of other religions. The Adil Shahis under his rule left a tradition of cosmopolitan culture and artistic patronage whose architectural remains are to be seen in the capital city of Bijapur.

== Biography ==
After the death of Ali Adil Shah I in 1580, the kingdom's nobles appointed Imran Ibrahim, son of Imran Sayzada Tahmash Adil Shah and nephew of Ali Adil Shah I, as sultan. At this time, Ibrahim Adil Shah II was a nine-year-old boy.

=== Regency (1580–1590) ===
Kamal Khan (a Deccani general) seized power and became the regent. Kamal Khan showed disrespect to the Dowager queen Chand Bibi, who felt that he had ambitions to usurp the throne. Chand Bibi plotted an attack against Kamal Khan, with help from another general, Haji Kishvar Khan. Kamal Khan was captured while fleeing and was beheaded at the fort. Kishvar Khan was the second regent of Ibrahim. He defeated the Ahmadnagar Sultanate at Dharaseo, capturing all the artillery and elephants of the enemy army. He ordered other Bijapur generals to surrender the highly valued elephants that they had captured. The generals, along with Chand Bibi, hatched a plan to eliminate Kishvar Khan with help from General Mustafa Khan of Bankapur. Kishvar Khan's spies informed him of the conspiracy. Kishvar Khan sent troops against Mustafa Khan, who was captured and killed in the battle.

Chand Bibi challenged Kishvar Khan, who had her imprisoned at the Satara fort and tried to declare himself the king. However, Kishvar Khan was already unpopular among the rest of the generals. He was forced to flee when a joint army, led by General Ikhlas Khan, marched to Bijapur. The army consisted of forces of three Habshi nobles: Ikhlas Khan, Hamid Khan and Dilavar Khan. Kishvar Khan attacked Ahmednagar unsuccessfully and then fled to Golconda. He was killed in exile by a relative of Mustafa Khan. Chand Bibi was then declared the regent.

Ikhlas Khan became regent for a short time, but he was dismissed by Chand Bibi shortly afterwards. Later, he resumed his dictatorship, which was soon challenged by other Habshi generals.

Taking advantage of the situation in Bijapur, Ahmadnagar's sultan allied with the Qutb Shahi of Golconda to attack Bijapur. The troops available at Bijapur were not sufficient to repulse the joint attack. The Habshi generals realised that they could not defend the city alone and tendered their resignations to Chand Bibi. Abu-ul-Hassan, general appointed by Chand Bibi, called for the Maratha forces in the Carnatic. The Marathas attacked the invaders' supply lines, forcing the Ahmednagar-Golconda allied army to retreat.

Ikhlas Khan then attacked Dilavar Khan to seize control of Bijapur. However, he was defeated and Dilavar Khan became the supreme ruler from 1582 to 1591. He was the last regent of Ibrahim.

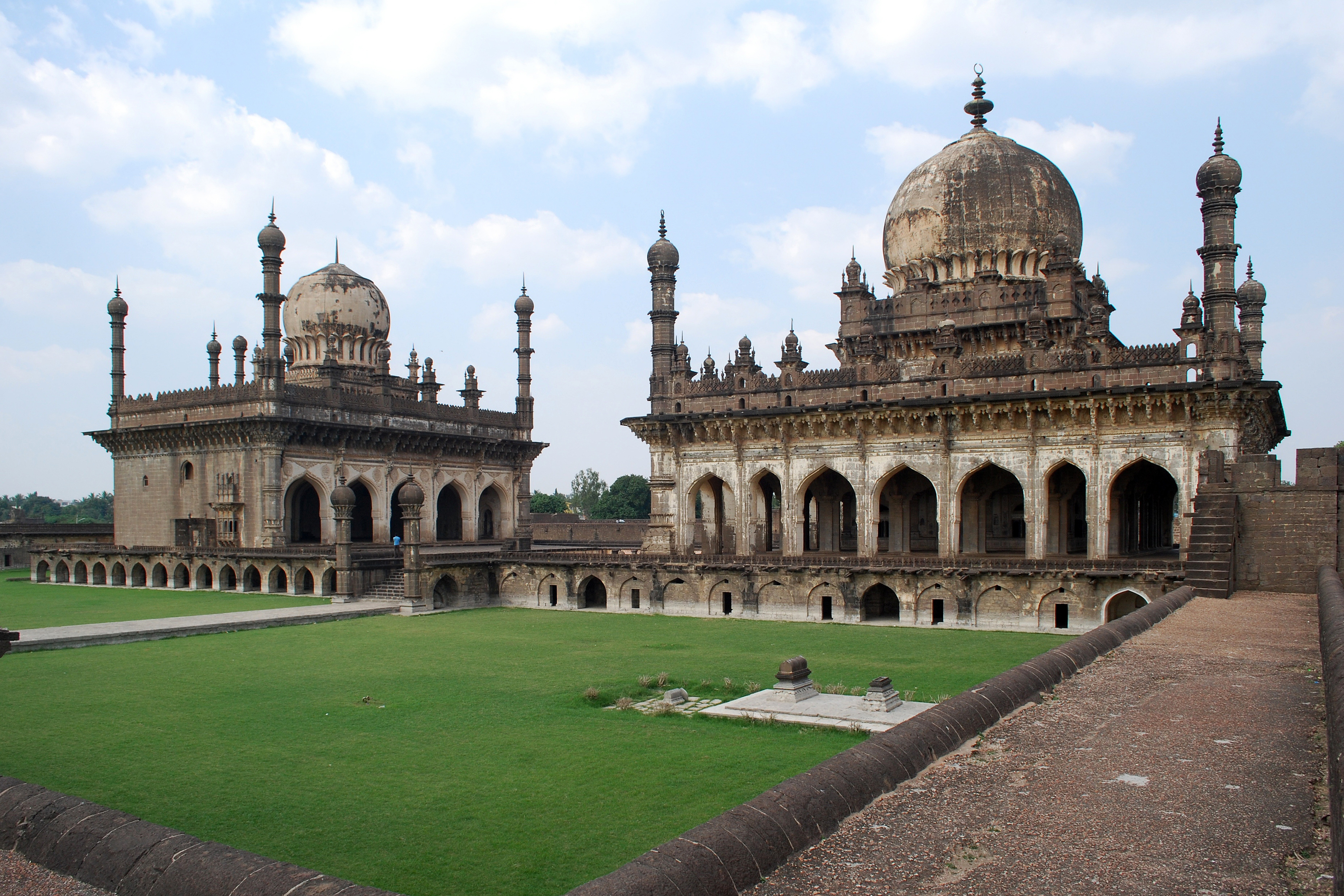
Tomb in Ibrahim Rauza, Bijapur

=== Unfettered reign (1590–1627) ===
Ibrahim II is known in Indian history as Jagadguru Badshah. He loved music and played musical instruments. For him, the Tanpura personified learning – "Ibrahim the tanpurawala became learned due to grace of god, living in the city of Vidyanagari" (Vidyanagari is the earlier name of Bijapur.) He composed poems on his wife Chand Sultana, his Tanpura Motikhan and his elephant Atish Khan.

Ibrahim II publicly declared that all he wanted was Vidya or learning, music, and Guruseva (serving the teacher). He was a devotee of Banda Nawaj, the Sufi saint of Gulbarga. He composed a prayer to him to bestow Vidya or learning and charitable disposition.

He founded a new township at Nauraspur to give concrete shape to his idea of a musical city. He had a temple built inside the precincts of the palace that still exists.

Bijapur attracted the period's best musicians and dancers because the king was famous as a great connoisseur and patron of music.

He spoke Marathi, Dakhani, Urdu and Kannada languages fluently, and like his predecessors, employed several Hindus in top posts.

== Cultural activity ==
Under Ibrahim II, the court began to support works in the indigenous Deccani language, alongside the already well-established tradition of Persian patronage. This was part of a broader 17th-century cultural shift that sought to merge indigenous Indian styles with Persian aspects, rather than adhering to a purely Persian model. Deccani literature was now valued on par with or even above Persian at the time that Deccanis started to gain political hegemony over the Iranian elite. A Mughal ambassador noted Ibrahim II's flawed grasp of Persian. Indigenous poets became popular, such as Abdul (died 1603), Hasan Shauqi (died c. 1640), Miran Mian Hashimi (died c. 1697), and particularly Nusrati (died 1674). An important Deccani text on Indian musicology, Kitab-i Nauras, was written by Ibrahim II. However, even in Bijapur's later culture, the Persian language and literary heritage influenced it. Its traditions were closely followed by the Deccani literary style, such as the tadhkira or tarikh in prose and the mathnavi or ghazal in poetry. A third of the vocabulary in both modern and medieval Marathi language is derived from Persian due to centuries of contact.

The major Persian poets under Ibrahim II were Malek Qommi (died 1616), Muhammad Zuhuri, Sanjar Kashani (died 1612), and Zihni Kashani (fl. 1587), all immigrants from Iran. The equal standing of Persian and Dakhni was demonstrated by Zuhuri's Persian introduction in Ibrahim II's Kitab-i Nauras. Under the orders of Ibrahim II, Firishta composed the Tarikh-i Firishta in Persian, a detailed chronicle on the history of India, especially the Deccan sultanates. The work was based on the Rawzat as-safa by Mirkhvand (died 1498), and according to the Indologist Richard M. Eaton, "remains an indispensable source not only for the history of Bijapur but for the history of medieval India generally." A history Bijapur and of other contemporary courts was also composed by Rafi al-Din Shirazi in his Tazkirat al-Muluk ("History of Kings").

== Sources ==
- Eaton, Richard M. (1978). The Sufis of Bijapur, 1300–1700. Princeton University Press. ISBN 9781400868155.
- Eaton, Richard M. (1983). "ʿĀdelšāhīs". In Yarshater, Ehsan (ed.). Encyclopædia Iranica (Online ed.). Brill.
- Mitchell, George; Zebrowski, Mark (1999). Architecture and Art of the Deccan Sultanates (The New Cambridge History of India Vol. I:7). Cambridge: Cambridge University Press. ISBN 0-521-56321-6.
- Overton, Keelan (2016). "Book Culture, Royal Libraries, and Persianate Painting in Bijapur, circa 1580‒1630". Muqarnas. 33: 91–154. doi:10.1163/22118993_03301P006. JSTOR 26551683.
- Overton, Keelan (2020). "Introduction to Iranian Mobilities and Persianate Mediations in the Deccan". In Overton, Keelan (ed.). Iran and the Deccan: Persianate Art, Culture, and Talent in Circulation, 1400–1700. Indiana University Press. pp. 3–76. ISBN 978-0253048912.
- Sharma, Sunil (2020). "Forging a Canon of Dakhni Literature: Translations and Retellings from Persian". In Overton, Keelan (ed.). Iran and the Deccan: Persianate Art, Culture, and Talent in Circulation, 1400–1700. Indiana University Press. pp. 401–420. ISBN 978-0253048912.

Ibrahim Adil Shah II Adil Shahi dynasty Born: c. 1570 Died: 1627
Regnal titles
Preceded by Ali Adil Shah I	Sultan of Bijapur; 1580–1627	Succeeded by Mohammed Adil Shah
